= List of MPs who stood down at the 2010 United Kingdom general election =

A record number of members of Parliament (MPs) stood down at the 2010 general election, meaning they were MPs in the 54th Parliament, but chose not to contest the 2010 general election, in some cases after being deselected by their parties.

This election had an unusually high number of MPs choosing not to seek re-election, with more standing down than did so at the 1945 election (which on account of the extraordinary wartime circumstances came ten years after the preceding election). This has been attributed to the expenses scandal and the fact that redundancy-style payments for departing MPs may be scrapped after the election.

In all, 149 MPs (100 Labour, 35 Conservatives, seven Liberal Democrats, two independents, one Independent Conservative and one member each from Plaid Cymru, the Scottish National Party, the Democratic Unionist Party, and Social Democratic and Labour Party) announced that they would not be contesting the next election. In four of these cases a sitting MP was not selected by their Constituency Labour Party to stand.

In addition, three seats were vacant at the dissolution of Parliament on 12 April 2010, where the sitting MP had died or resigned and no by-election had been held.

== MPs who were de-selected, barred from standing or defeated in selection ==
Party	Name	Constituency	Year elected	Reason for not standing	Replaced as MP by	Party
Labour Party	David Chaytor	Bury North	1997	Barred from standing due to United Kingdom parliamentary expenses scandal	David Nuttall	Conservative Party
Labour Party	Jim Devine	Livingston	2005	Barred from standing due to United Kingdom parliamentary expenses scandal	Graeme Morrice	Labour Party
Labour Party	Anne Moffat	East Lothian	2001	De-selected	Fiona O'Donnell	Labour Party
Labour Party	Edward O'Hara	Knowsley South	1990	Defeated in selection process by fellow MP George Howarth	George Howarth	Labour Party
Labour Party	Margaret Moran	Luton South	1997	Barred from standing due to United Kingdom Parliamentary expenses scandal	Gavin Shuker	Labour Party
Labour Party	The Right Honourable; Elliot Morley	Scunthorpe	1987	Barred from standing due to United Kingdom parliamentary expenses scandal	Nic Dakin	Labour Party
Labour Party	Ian Stewart	Eccles	1997	Defeated in selection process by fellow MP Hazel Blears	Hazel Blears	Labour Party
Labour Party	Bob Wareing	Liverpool West Derby	1983	De-selected	Stephen Twigg	Labour Party
Conservative	John Greenway	Ryedale	1987	Defeated in selection process by fellow MP Anne McIntosh	Anne McIntosh	Conservative Party

== Labour ==
Labour's National Executive Committee (NEC) barred five MPs from standing as official Labour Party candidates at the 2010 general election in the wake of the United Kingdom parliamentary expenses scandal. However, they could stand as independent candidates. Three of these MPs, David Chaytor, Margaret Moran and Elliot Morley, stated that they would be standing down as MPs. Another, Ian Gibson, resigned his seat, causing a by-election in Norwich North that was won by Conservative candidate Chloe Smith. The fifth, Jim Devine, hinted either at forcing a by-election or standing for re-election as an independent, but ended up standing down.

The East Lothian Labour Party voted on 19 March 2010 to deselect their MP, Anne Moffat, who appealed the decision the NEC, which rejected her appeal. Moffat chose to stand down at the general election, and it was revealed that she had been negotiating a pension based on retirement with a health condition at the same time she was fighting the deselection.

List of Labour MPs standing down:

1. Hilary Armstrong — North West Durham, announced 4 July 2009
2. John Austin — Erith and Thamesmead, announced 31 July 2008
3. John Battle — Leeds West, announced 20 October 2006
4. Liz Blackman — Erewash, announced 9 January 2010
5. Des Browne — Kilmarnock and Loudoun, announced 27 November 2009
6. Colin Burgon — Elmet, announced 23 April 2009
7. Stephen Byers — North Tyneside, announced 14 November 2009
8. Richard Caborn — Sheffield Central, announced 13 September 2007
9. Colin Challen — Morley and Rothwell, announced 30 January 2007
10. Ben Chapman — Wirral South, announced 21 May 2009
11. David Chaytor — Bury North, announced 2 June 2009
12. Michael Clapham — Barnsley West and Penistone, announced 14 November 2006
13. David Clelland — Tyne Bridge, announced 26 January 2010
14. Harry Cohen — Leyton and Wanstead, announced 30 June 2009
15. Jim Cousins — Newcastle upon Tyne Central, announced 9 June 2009
16. Ann Cryer — Keighley, announced 21 August 2008
17. John Cummings — Easington, announced 9 October 2006
18. Claire Curtis-Thomas — Crosby, announced 7 October 2009
19. Quentin Davies — Grantham and Stamford
20. Janet Dean — Burton, announced 20 June 2007
21. Jim Devine — Livingston, prevented from standing as a Labour candidate 15 June 2009.
22. Jeffrey Ennis — Barnsley East and Mexborough, announced 9 February 2010
23. Bill Etherington — Sunderland North, announced 9 December 2006
24. Mark Fisher — Stoke-on-Trent Central, announced 10 March 2010
25. Barbara Follett — Stevenage, announced 1 October 2009
26. Bruce George — Walsall South, announced 18 February 2010
27. Neil Gerrard — Walthamstow, announced 23 February 2007
28. Nigel Griffiths — Edinburgh South, announced 31 January 2010
29. John Grogan — Selby, announced 10 October 2006
30. Mike Hall — Weaver Vale, announced 2 February 2010
31. Sylvia Heal — Halesowen and Rowley Regis, announced 9 March 2010
32. Doug Henderson — Newcastle upon Tyne North, announced 4 July 2009
33. John Heppell — Nottingham East, announced 26 March 2010
34. Stephen Hesford — Wirral West, announced 23 January 2010
35. Patricia Hewitt — Leicester West, announced 2 June 2009
36. Keith Hill — Streatham, announced 23 May 2007
37. Geoff Hoon — Ashfield, announced 11 February 2010
38. Kim Howells — Pontypridd, announced 18 December 2009
39. Beverley Hughes — Stretford and Urmston, announced 2 June 2009
40. Joan Humble — Blackpool North and Fleetwood, announced 27 February 2010
41. John Hutton — Barrow and Furness, announced 5 June 2009
42. Brian Iddon — Bolton South East, announced 5 October 2006
43. Adam Ingram — East Kilbride, Strathaven and Lesmahagow, announced 27 March 2009
44. Lynne Jones — Birmingham Selly Oak, announced January 2007
45. Martyn Jones — Clwyd South, announced 7 May 2009
46. Ruth Kelly — Bolton West, announced 2 October 2008
47. Fraser Kemp — Houghton and Washington East. announced 6 September 2008
48. Jane Kennedy — Liverpool Wavertree, announced 9 November 2009
49. Peter Kilfoyle — Liverpool Walton, announced 23 February 2010
50. Robert Laxton — Derby North, announced 19 October 2009
51. David Lepper — Brighton Pavilion, announced 19 September 2006
52. Tom Levitt — High Peak, announced 12 November 2009
53. Tommy McAvoy — Rutherglen and Hamilton West, announced 20 February 2010
54. Chris McCafferty — Calder Valley, announced 7 March 2007
55. Ian McCartney — Makerfield, announced 23 May 2009
56. John McFall — West Dunbartonshire, announced 29 January 2010
57. Rosemary McKenna — Cumbernauld, Kilsyth and Kirkintilloch East, announced 3 August 2007
58. Andrew MacKinlay — Thurrock, announced 24 July 2009
59. Bob Marshall-Andrews — Medway, announced 17 July 2007
60. Eric Martlew — Carlisle, announced 1 May 2009
61. Alan Milburn — Darlington, announced 27 June 2009
62. Anne Moffat — East Lothian, de-selected 19 March 2010, announced 25 March 2010
63. Laura Moffatt — Crawley, announced 15 March 2010
64. Margaret Moran — Luton South, announced 28 May 2009
65. Elliot Morley — Scunthorpe, announced 29 May 2009
66. Kali Mountford — Colne Valley, announced 16 January 2009
67. Chris Mullin — Sunderland South, announced 10 May 2008
68. Denis Murphy — Wansbeck, announced 5 November 2009
69. Doug Naysmith — Bristol North West, announced 26 January 2007
70. Edward O'Hara — Knowsley South, defeated in selection for merged seat 26 April 2007 and not running as an independent
71. Bill Olner — Nuneaton, announced 25 March 2007
72. Ian Pearson — Dudley South, announced 21 January 2010
73. Greg Pope — Hyndburn, announced 11 June 2009
74. Bridget Prentice — Lewisham East, announced 6 April 2009
75. John Prescott — Kingston upon Hull East, announced 27 August 2007
76. James Purnell — Stalybridge and Hyde, announced 19 February 2010
77. Ken Purchase — Wolverhampton North East, announced 27 October 2007
78. John Reid — Airdrie and Shotts, announced 15 September 2007
79. Martin Salter — Reading West, announced 10 February 2009
80. Mohammad Sarwar — Glasgow Central, announced 21 June 2007
81. Siôn Simon — Birmingham Erdington, announced 3 February 2010
82. Alan Simpson — Nottingham South, announced 18 February 2007
83. John Smith — Vale of Glamorgan, announced 22 May 2009
84. Helen Southworth — Warrington South, announced 16 June 2009
85. Ian Stewart — Eccles, defeated in selection for merged seat 19 January 2008
86. Howard Stoate — Dartford, announced 28 July 2009
87. Gavin Strang — Edinburgh East, announced 26 November 2007, but reversed his decision 31 March 2008. He announced on 27 June 2008 that he will stand down after all.
88. Paddy Tipping — Sherwood, announced 23 October 2009
89. Mark Todd — South Derbyshire, announced 21 September 2007
90. Don Touhig — Islwyn, announced 29 January 2010
91. Paul Truswell — Pudsey, announced 8 July 2009
92. Des Turner — Brighton Kemptown, announced 23 October 2006
93. Neil Turner — Wigan, announced 31 July 2009
94. Kitty Ussher — Burnley, announced 17 June 2009
95. Rudi Vis — Finchley and Golders Green, announced 28 May 2008
96. Alan Williams — Swansea West, announced September 2006
97. Betty Williams — Conwy, announced 12 September 2008
98. Michael Wills — North Swindon, announced 14 September 2009
99. Tony Wright — Cannock Chase, announced 21 July 2008
100. Derek Wyatt — Sittingbourne and Sheppey, announced 1 July 2009

== Conservative ==
1. Michael Ancram — Devizes, announced 11 August 2009
2. Peter Ainsworth — East Surrey, announced 5 January 2010
3. Peter Atkinson — Hexham, announced 19 June 2008
4. Tim Boswell — Daventry, announced 31 March 2006
5. Angela Browning — Tiverton and Honiton, announced 17 November 2006
6. Sir John Butterfill — Bournemouth West, announced 17 March 2008
7. Sir Patrick Cormack — South Staffordshire, announced 1 December 2009
8. David Curry — Skipton and Ripon, announced 5 February 2009
9. Christopher Fraser — Norfolk South West, announced 28 May 2009
10. Paul Goodman — Wycombe, announced 5 June 2009
11. John Greenway — Ryedale, announced 28 November 2006
12. John Gummer — Suffolk Coastal, announced 30 December 2009
13. Douglas Hogg — Sleaford and North Hykeham, announced 19 May 2009
14. John Horam — Orpington, announced 12 October 2009
15. Michael Howard — Folkestone and Hythe, announced 17 March 2006
16. Michael Jack — Fylde, announced 14 March 2008
17. Robert Key — Salisbury, announced 2 December 2009
18. Julie Kirkbride — Bromsgrove, announced on 28 May 2009 that she would stand down, reversed her decision on 5 November, then announced she would indeed stand down on 18 December
19. Jacqui Lait — Beckenham, announced 21 September 2009
20. Sir Michael Lord — Central Suffolk and North Ipswich, announced 12 September 2009
21. Andrew MacKay — Bracknell, announced 23 May 2009
22. David Maclean — Penrith and The Border, announced 26 June 2009
23. Humfrey Malins — Woking, announced 16 March 2009
24. John Maples — Stratford-on-Avon, announced 10 January 2010
25. Michael Mates — East Hampshire, announced 24 November 2006
26. Malcolm Moss — North East Cambridgeshire, announced 6 September 2007
27. Sir Michael Spicer — West Worcestershire, announced 24 March 2006
28. Richard Spring — West Suffolk, announced 23 November 2009
29. Anthony Steen — Totnes, announced 20 May 2009
30. Ian Taylor — Esher and Walton, announced 16 June 2009
31. Sir Peter Viggers — Gosport, announced 20 May 2009
32. Ann Widdecombe — Maidstone and The Weald, announced 7 October 2007
33. David Wilshire — Spelthorne, announced 15 October 2009
34. Sir Nicholas Winterton — Macclesfield, announced 25 May 2009
35. Ann, Lady Winterton — Congleton, announced 25 May 2009

== Liberal Democrats ==
1. John Barrett — Edinburgh West, announced 25 July 2009
2. Colin Breed — South East Cornwall, announced 9 October 2007
3. David Howarth — Cambridge, announced 5 November 2009
4. Paul Keetch — Hereford, announced 16 November 2006
5. Mark Oaten — Winchester, announced 25 July 2006
6. Matthew Taylor — Truro and St Austell, announced 17 January 2007.
7. Phil Willis — Harrogate and Knaresborough, announced 18 May 2007.

== Other parties ==
Andrew Pelling (Croydon Central), who was elected as a Conservative but had the party whip withdrawn, announced on 4 December 2007 that he would not stand for re-election. He was later reported to be reconsidering, and on 30 March 2010 he confirmed that he would stand for re-election as an independent candidate.

1. Derek Conway (Independent conservative; Conservative Party whip withdrawn) — Old Bexley and Sidcup, announced 30 January 2008
2. Eddie McGrady (Social Democratic and Labour Party) — South Down, announced 25 February 2010
3. Ian Paisley (Democratic Unionist Party) — North Antrim, announced January 2008, although it was speculated that he may have reversed his decision. Paisley finally confirmed his intention to stand down on 2 March 2010.
4. Adam Price (Plaid Cymru) — Carmarthen East and Dinefwr, announced 18 September 2009
5. Alex Salmond MSP (Scottish National Party) — Banff and Buchan, announced 15 January 2006 (will remain an MSP)
6. Clare Short (Independent; elected as Labour, resigned the whip 20 October 2006) — Birmingham Ladywood, announced 14 September 2006.
7. Robert Wareing (Independent; elected as Labour, deselected resigned the whip in October 2007) — Liverpool West Derby, announced 4 March 2010.

== Seats vacant ==
Three seats in the House of Commons were vacant when Parliament was dissolved on 12 April. In two cases the sitting Members had indicated that they would be standing down at the general election.

1. Ashok Kumar — (Middlesbrough South and East Cleveland, Labour) died on 15 March 2010, having intended to fight his seat at the coming election.
2. Iris Robinson — (Strangford, Democratic Unionist Party) had announced on 28 December 2009 that she would not seek re-election. However subsequent events led her to resign her seat on 13 January 2010.
3. David Taylor — (North West Leicestershire, Labour) had announced on 13 May 2008 that he would stand down at the general election, but died on 26 December 2009.
