= R v Chaytor =

2010 judgment of the Supreme Court of the United Kingdom

- Court: Supreme Court of the United Kingdom
- Full case name: The Crown against or and (most formally Regina versus) Chaytor and others (Chaytor, Morley and Devine)
- Decided: 18–19 October 2010, decision pronounced 1 December 2010
- Citation: [2010] UKSC 52

Case history
- Prior action: [2010] EWCA Crim 1910

Ruling
- Members of Parliament could be prosecuted for false accounting in relation to the parliamentary expenses' scandal (without violating parliamentary privilege)

Court membership
- President: Phillips
- Justices: Hope, Rodger, Hale, Brown, Mance, Collins, Kerr, Clarke.

Case opinions
- Majority: Phillips and Rogers, joined by unanimous court
- Concurrence: Kerr

Keywords
- False accounting; Constitutional law; Parliamentary privilege

R v Chaytor and others [2010] UKSC 52 was a 2010 judgment of the Supreme Court of the United Kingdom. The case concerned the trials of three former Members of Parliament for false accounting in relation to the parliamentary expenses scandal of 2009.

During their trials, the three MPs (David Chaytor, Elliot Morley and Jim Devine) had each separately argued unsuccessfully that there was no case to answer as the doctrine of parliamentary privilege covered the expense claims and could not be the basis of criminal charges. They appealed (along with Lord Hanningfield) to the Court of Appeal where three of the most senior judges in that court (Lord Judge LCJ, Lord Neuberger MR and Sir Anthony May – the President of the Queen's Bench Division) had dismissed their arguments.

The MPs (although not Lord Hanningfield) successfully applied to the Supreme Court for permission to appeal the decision. The Supreme Court, comprising nine judges to reflect the importance of the matter, heard arguments over two days in October 2010 before unanimously rejecting the submission that Parliamentary privilege under either the common law or the Bill of Rights 1689 protected the defendants from prosecution.

As a consequence, each case was referred back to the Crown Court. Chaytor and Morley pleaded guilty to dishonesty offences and Devine was found guilty at trial. Each received sentences of imprisonment between 16 and 18 months in relation to their expenses claims.

== Facts ==
In February 2010, in the wake of the parliamentary expenses' scandal, Keir Starmer, the Director of Public Prosecutions, announced an intention to charge three Labour MPs – David Chaytor, MP for Bury North; Elliot Morley, MP for Scunthorpe; and Jim Devine, MP for Livingston – as well as Conservative Party peer Lord Hanningfield with false accounting contrary to section 17 Theft Act 1968.

Each charge was brought in relation to allegations that each defendant had misused the Parliamentary expenses system and dishonestly claimed substantial sums of money to which they were not entitled during their terms in Parliament.

Each defendant was separately committed for trial at the Crown Court and separately raised the argument that proceedings could not be brought against them due to the protection of parliamentary privilege. A single hearing was held to determine the matter, in which Mr. Justice Saunders ruled that the politicians were not afforded protection by parliamentary privilege. The four defendants appealed to the Court of Appeal (Criminal Division).

== Obiter ==
Lord Clarke's extra words, his thus obiter judgment – not concurred nor dissented in by the rest of the panel – were that once waived or relinquished by Parliament, no MP or peer can rely upon exclusive cognisance. This is a shorthand for that of Parliament. He viewed that a relevant (parliamentary) Resolution of 1980, jurist Lord Phillips' legal interpretation of this in the 23rd edition of Erskine May on Parliamentary Practice, and the reasoning sounding odd to modern ears meant these factors would override the reasoning of Lord Brougham L.C. in Wellesley v Duke of Beaufort.
