= United Kingdom parliamentary expenses scandal =

2009 British political scandal

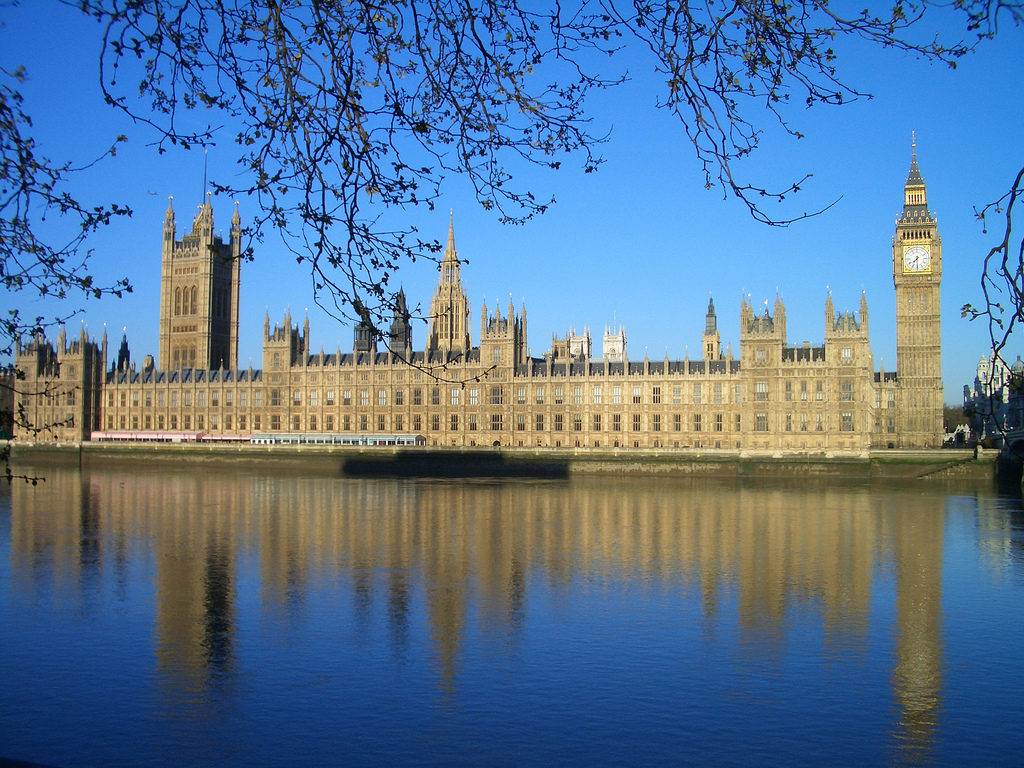
The Palace of Westminster

The United Kingdom parliamentary expenses scandal was a major political scandal that emerged in 2009, concerning expense claims made by members of the British Parliament in both the House of Commons and the House of Lords over the previous years. The disclosure of widespread misuse of allowances and expenses permitted to members of Parliament (MPs) aroused widespread anger among the UK public and resulted in a large number of resignations, sackings, de-selections, and retirement announcements, together with public apologies and the repayment of expenses. Several members, and former members, of both the House of Commons and the House of Lords were prosecuted and sentenced to terms of imprisonment.

A February 2008 Freedom of Information Act request for the release of details of MPs' expense claims was allowed by an Information Tribunal and was challenged by the House of Commons Authorities on the grounds that it was "unlawfully intrusive". In May 2008, the High Court (England and Wales) ruled in favour of releasing the information. In April 2009, the House of Commons authorities announced that publication of expenses, with certain information deemed "sensitive" redacted, would be made available in July 2009. However, before this could take place, the expenses' records and documentation were leaked to The Daily Telegraph newspaper, which began publishing details in daily instalments from 8 May 2009. These disclosures dominated the British media for weeks. On 18 June 2009, the details of all MP expenses and allowance claims approved from 2004 to 2008 were published on the official Parliament website, but with some details removed, such as addresses, claims that were not approved for payment, and correspondence between MPs and the parliamentary fees office. This brought further accusations of unnecessary secrecy and allegations that this might have prevented serious abuses from being disclosed.

Since most claims revolved around MPs' second homes in London, a panel was established to investigate all claims relating to the "second homes" allowance between 2004 and 2008. Headed by former civil servant Sir Thomas Legg, the panel published its findings on 12 October as MPs returned to Westminster following the summer recess. Each MP received a letter stating whether or not he or she would be required to repay any expenses claimed. Details of voluntary repayments by MPs amounting to almost £500,000 were also officially published.

It was announced on 5 February 2010 that criminal charges of false accounting were to be prosecuted against four parliamentarians, all later jailed. On 19 May, charges were brought against two more, and on 13 and 14 October 2010, two more faced legal proceedings. Three peers were suspended on 18 October 2010 due to their expense claims.

== Background and legal proceedings ==
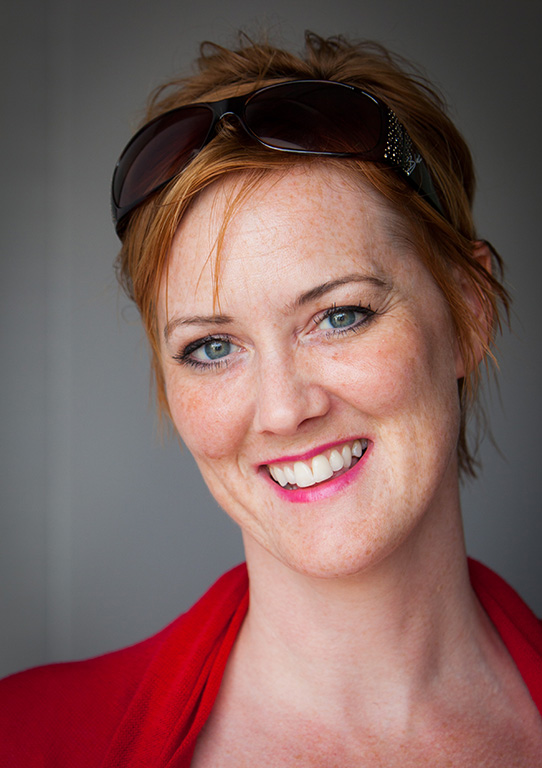
Heather Brooke in May 2012

In the United Kingdom, MPs can claim expenses, including the cost of accommodation, 'wholly, exclusively and necessarily incurred for the performance of a Member's parliamentary duties'.

In January 2005, the Freedom of Information Act 2000 came into force, allowing members of the public to request disclosure of information from public bodies. One early request came from the journalist Jon Ungoed-Thomas. Another request came from journalist and freedom of information campaigner Heather Brooke. Both asked for details of the expenses claimed by certain MPs to be released. The requests were subsequently passed over to the Information Commissioner, who joined the journalists' cases together and ordered the release of some information on 15 June 2007. House of Commons authorities objected to this order in June 2007, and MPs had, in May 2007, voted in favour of the Freedom of Information (Amendment) Bill, which sought to exempt MPs from the 2000 Act. The House of Commons voted 96 to 25 in favour of the Exemption of the House of Commons amendment, but the bill was ultimately withdrawn prior to a second reading in the House of Lords because peers were unwilling to sponsor the bill.

In February 2008, after referral to an Information Tribunal, it was held that Commons authorities would release information on 14 MPs. This decision was subsequently appealed against, delaying the release of information.

In the tax year 2007–2008, MPs' costs of staying away from their main homes were limited to £23,083.

In January 2009, Harriet Harman, Leader of the House of Commons, tabled a motion that would exempt MPs' expenses from being disclosed under a Freedom of Information request, in order to prevent any further disclosure of information. Labour MPs were placed under a three-line whip in order to force the motion through the Commons. However, opposition parties stated they would vote against the proposals, and large-scale public opposition emerged. The proposals were ultimately dropped on 21 January 2009. The Commons authorities announced that full disclosure of all MPs' expenses would be published on 1 July 2009.

Ultimately, the media disclosure made the legal appeal moot; the appeal was finally heard at the High Court, which ruled on 16 May 2008 in favour of releasing the information. No appeal was lodged against the High Court ruling, and the requested details were made public on 23 May 2008.

== Pre-publication controversies ==
Prior to The Daily Telegraph's revelations in May and June 2009 and the official publication of expenses claimed in June 2009, and during the Freedom of Information cases, there were a variety of exposés that covered the controversial John Lewis List (a list considered to indicate amounts that could be claimed without question) and individual MPs' expenses claims. Examples of items publicised prior to the May 2009 disclosures included:

- Tony Blair's expenses were shredded 'by mistake' when they were the subject of a legal bid to have them published.
- Conservative Derek Conway was alleged in May 2007 to have paid his son, a student at the time, using public funds despite little evidence of his having done the work he was supposed to do. The matter was forwarded to the House of Commons' Standards and Privileges Committee, whose report, dated 28 January 2008, concluded there was no record of such work. Conway was suspended for 10 days and ordered to repay £13,000. Conway was also expelled from the party. A second case, a year later, found he had overpaid with regard to his other son.
- Chairman of the Conservative Party Caroline Spelman was alleged in June 2008 to have paid for her nanny out of parliamentary expenses during her early years in Parliament, between 1997 and 1998—an allegation that became known as 'Nannygate'. It was ruled that she had inadvertently 'misapplied part of [her] parliamentary allowances', but calls for her sacking were rebutted since she might not have been aware of the rules governing the use or purpose of parliamentary allowances. The committee recommended that Spelman repay £9,600.
- Married couple and Labour Cabinet ministers Ed Balls and Yvette Cooper were accused in September 2007 of exploiting the Commons' allowances system in order to pay for a £655,000 house in London. The complaint, centring on the gain made by allocation of their 'second house', was dismissed since it was held that the couple had acted in accordance with parliamentary rules.
- Married Conservative MPs Sir Nicholas and Lady Winterton were accused in June 2008 of claiming back mortgage interest on a mortgage they had fully repaid, on a flat they owned in London, and then also placing the flat in trust and claiming for the rent on it. It was held that there had been a clear breach of the rules, but no repayment was ordered.
- Labour Home Secretary Jacqui Smith was stated to have claimed for her main home by designating it as a second home, while identifying as her main home a location where she spent as little as two days a week, and despite also having access to a ‘grace and favour’ home in Westminster. No investigation was held, however, the Parliamentary Commissioner for Standards stating there was 'not sufficient evidence for an inquiry'.
- Labour minister Tony McNulty admitted claiming expenses for a second home in Harrow, 8 miles from his main home in Hammersmith, and asserted they were appropriate, but ceased claiming the allowances. Under continuing pressure, he apologised to the House for expenses abuses on 29 October 2009.
- Conservative MP Eric Pickles likewise was identified as claiming for a second home 37 miles from his main home.

== Information disclosed by The Daily Telegraph ==
In May 2009, two months prior to the official disclosure of full expenses claims, The Daily Telegraph obtained a full copy of all expenses claimed. The Telegraph began publishing, in instalments from 8 May 2009, certain MPs' expenses. The Telegraph justified the publication of the information because it contended that the official information due to be released would have omitted key information about re-designating of second-home nominations.

The information in the leaks published by The Daily Telegraph originated from the parliamentary fees office, and had been offered to other newspaper organisations for more than £150,000. In September 2009, the assistant editor of the Telegraph, Andrew Pierce, revealed in an interview that the newspaper had paid £110,000 for the information, and described it as 'money well spent in the public interest'. The Times and The Sun had turned down an offer to buy the leaked expenses file.

Shortly after the publication of the information, the House of Commons authorities asked the Metropolitan Police to investigate. The Police declined, on the grounds that any attempted prosecution might meet with a successful public interest defence.

=== Areas of abuse ===
Alongside specific allegations of incorrect claims such as claims for the cost of mortgages which it transpired had already been repaid in full the Telegraph alleged that parliamentary 'Green Book' expenses rules gave wide scope for a number of abuses, especially those related to costs of maintaining two residences, one in the constituency and one in London. Areas of questionable claims highlighted by the Telegraph included:

- Nominating second homes: the Green Book states that 'the location of your main home will normally be a matter of fact'. MPs and peers were able to ensure that their second home was the one which enabled them to claim more expenses. In at least one case (Margaret Moran) the nominated home was near neither their constituency nor Westminster.
- Re-designating second homes: MPs were able to repeatedly switch the designation of their second home, enabling them to claim for purchasing (e.g., Stamp duty), renovating, and furnishing more than one property. This practice became widely known as 'flipping'.
- Renting out homes: MPs were able to claim for their 'second home' while they were, in fact, renting other homes out. In most cases the rented homes were 'third' properties, but in Elliott Morley's case, a second home was rented to another MP, Ian Cawsey, who was claiming the rent on expenses.
- Over-claiming for council tax on second home: MPs were able to round up actual amounts due, claiming for 12 monthly instalments where only 10 were due or by claiming up to £250.00 per month with no receipt required until those rules were changed. Over 50 MPs were alleged to have over-claimed council tax.
- Subsidising property development: the Green Book rule that MPs could not claim for repairs 'beyond making good dilapidations' was not enforced and consequently MPs were able to add significantly to the value of a property. By implication some 'second homes' were effectively businesses (not homes) since they were renovated on expenses and then rapidly sold.
- Evading tax and inappropriate attempts at avoiding tax: MPs either evaded tax, or inappropriately deemed themselves not required to pay tax on reimbursements when it was likely tax was due. This covered two areas:
  - Capital gains tax: MPs were able to designate a property as their second home with the parliamentary fees office so as to claim the cost of renovating it on expenses, but a number of MPs had concurrently described a property as their second home to claim expenses, and to the UK tax authority HM Revenue and Customs as their primary residence in order to sell it without capital gains tax. Some also designated a property as a primary or secondary residence for tax or expenses benefits which was apparently little if at all used by them in that role.
  - Income tax: a number of MPs were criticised for non-payment of income tax for benefits in kind or for reimbursed expenses considered under UK tax law to be of a personal nature. As of 31 May 2009, some 40 MPs had been identified as claiming for personal expenses such as preparation of their tax returns, despite UK tax law and ministerial guidance both of which had stated such expenses were not claimable for tax purposes; of those claiming, only a minority paid tax on the benefit in kind.
- Claiming expenses while living in grace and favour homes: ministers with 'grace and favour' homes in Westminster as well as their existing primary residence were able to claim for a further 'second home' in addition.
- Renovating and furnishing properties when standing down: MPs were able to claim for renovations and furniture even when they had already announced their intention to resign from Parliament.
- Furnishing of other homes: MPs were able to claim for items of furniture that were actually delivered somewhere other than their second home.
- Exploiting the 'no receipt' rule: MPs submitted a large number of claims for just below £250, the ceiling under which they were not required to produce receipts, without being challenged as to their legitimacy.
- Over-claiming for food: under a rule permitting up to £400 for food each month (without receipts), MPs were simply able to claim the whole £400 every month, even when Parliament was not sitting.
- Overspending at the end of the financial year: MPs were able to submit claims just before the end of the financial year, so as to use up allowances, without being challenged as to their legitimacy.

=== Specific claims ===
The Telegraph first revealed expenses of the governing Labour Party, beginning with the Cabinet on 8 May 2009, before releasing details of the claims by junior ministers and Labour backbenchers. Further allegations were made on 14 May.

On 11 and 12 May, publication focused on the frontbench of the Conservative Party followed by the claims of backbench Conservative MPs whom the newspaper dubbed 'the grandees' of the party. On 12 May, the Leader of the Opposition, David Cameron, announced that all questionable claims by the Shadow cabinet would be repaid.

The Liberal Democrats expenses were revealed last of the three main parties, followed by Sinn Féin members' claims in which it was reported that the five Sinn Féin MPs together had claimed nearly £500,000 in second home allowances, despite never taking up their seats at Westminster due to the party's abstentionist policy. Sinn Féin stated that its members often have to travel to London on parliamentary business.

The claims published by The Daily Telegraph ultimately covered the entire gamut of Parliament—all major parties and several minor ones, ministers (including the Prime Minister Gordon Brown, the Chancellor, cabinet and shadow cabinet members) through to backbenchers, and members of both the House of Lords and the House of Commons. A number of members were expelled from their parties, or would not stand for re-election; some members repaid, in part or whole, sums they had previously claimed. Expenses claims to be repaid averaged £3,000. The highest repayment by an MP was £42,458.21 by Barbara Follett. There were also payments to the UK tax authority for taxes on possible gains or income previously not paid.

== Source of information ==
Former SAS officer Major John Wick, the owner of a London-based risk management company, has been named as the middle-man for an unnamed whistleblower; he has spoken of the need to bring the information he had been given into the public domain. Wick stated that:

The person on the end of the line told me he had a hard drive which contained details of every MP's expense claims over the past four years. Every receipt, every claim and every piece of correspondence between MPs and fees office staff was detailed—some four million separate pieces of information [...] those directly involved in processing the raw data were shocked and appalled by what they were seeing.

I was also being told that critical information—particularly the removal of addresses from the files—would lead to many of the scams never being publicly exposed. The ultimate source was adamant that the key thing was that both the information and the way in which it was handled should be in the public domain and that its release was in the public interest [...] I was assured that the data was not stolen but that it was an unregistered copy that had been produced as a result of the lax and unprofessional security procedures.

Wick went on to explain that following legal advice and review, and soul searching over loyalties, he had felt the matter was of sufficient concern to merit publication in a 'serious newspaper', and following discussions with a number of papers, the Telegraph had been granted exclusive access to study the material for 10 days from 30 April 2009.

There is an unresolved issue with the data itself, with different numbers being cited by different sources. The Daily Telegraph stated that 4 million pieces of information existed; The Guardian stated there were 2 million ("two million documents in all, including copies of expense claim forms, handwritten comments scrawled in margins, even attached sticky notes").

== The Daily Telegraph team ==
The Daily Telegraph had a team of journalists based in a training room at the Telegraph offices over London Victoria station. Training Room 4—"tucked off a dead-end corridor"—became nicknamed "the bunker."

Robert Winnett's team of lobby journalists, Whitehall editors, reporters, and social affairs correspondents, initially composed of Martin Beckford, Christopher Hope, Rosa Prince, Jon Swaine, and Holly Watt. James Kirkup joined the team once he returned from jury duty.

The team grew to "more than a dozen," as stories were published. Joining the team were a picture researcher and a designer, as well as deputy editor Tony Gallagher, head of news Chris Evans, news editor Matt Bailey, and head lawyer Arthur Wynn Davies.

== Media handling ==
In May 2009, major national newspapers such as The Times described the resulting controversy as "Parliament's darkest day" and a "full blown political crisis", reporting upon cross-party firings and resignations, an exodus of shamed MPs, the prospect of criminal and tax evasion charges, and a motion of no confidence being prepared against the Speaker.

Public interest in the expenses debate led to the 14 May 2009 edition of the BBC political and current affairs television programme Question Time recording its highest viewing figures in its 30-year run, of 3.8 million, with audience members heckling guest panellist Margaret Beckett. The following week's edition on 21 May was brought forward for a special edition into the prime time slot of 9 pm BST.

Nadine Dorries, a Conservative MP, criticised the Telegraph's handling, which she described as "picking off a few MPs each day, emailing at noon, giving five hours to reply, recording the conversation, not allowing them to speak, telling them they are going to publish anyway". She stated that the stress felt by some MPs was akin to "torture". Her comment was rejected by senior Conservatives. (See also Effect on MPs and on the political structure below)

== Impact ==
A widespread public reaction was heightened as a result of several factors: the incident broke in the face of an economic recession and financial crisis, under an already unpopular government, only weeks before the 2009 European Parliament elections.

=== Political response ===
Following the publication of expenses politicians from all parties responded to the controversy.

- Gordon Brown, the Prime Minister, during a speech to the Royal College of Nursing Conference on 11 May, apologised "on behalf of all politicians" for the expenses claims that had been made.
- David Cameron, the Leader of the Opposition, said that all MPs should apologise for the expenses scandal, shortly after the Telegraph published the claims of members of the Shadow Cabinet. Cameron also admitted that the existing system "was wrong and we're sorry about it". The following day, 12 May, Cameron said that some of the claims made were "unethical and wrong", and imposed new rules on what Conservative MPs could claim for in the future.
- Michael Martin, the Commons Speaker, made a statement to MPs on 11 May, the first sitting of the Commons since the Daily Telegraph began publishing specific details of individual claims. Martin said that "serious change" was required in the future and that, in the present, MPs should not just work within the rules, an explanation that many accused MPs had given in their defence, but rather in "the spirit of what is right". The Speaker also announced that a new 'Operational Assurance Unit' would be set up to independently oversee all claims, and that the House of Commons Commission would meet that evening to discuss whether or not to bring forward the official expenses publication date from 1 July.
  - In the aftermath of the Speaker's statement to MPs, questions were widely raised regarding Martin's future in the job, largely due to his focusing on the actual leak of information, rather than the expenses themselves, and due to his response to the point of order raised by the Labour MP Kate Hoey, who suggested that the Speaker and Commons' decision to call in the police was "an awful waste of resources". A Conservative MP, Douglas Carswell, subsequently announced that he planned to table a motion of no confidence in the Speaker, if he could garner sufficient support.
- Harriet Harman, the Leader of the House of Commons, asked Don Touhig, the Chairman of the Members' Allowance Committee, to devise a method for MPs to repay any excessive expenses.
- Ben Bradshaw, Minister of State in the Department of Health, raised the spectre of MPs being sent to prison for abusing the expenses system.
- William Hague, Shadow Foreign Secretary and a senior member of the Shadow Cabinet (Deputy to party leader David Cameron), also suggested that a number of MPs may face criminal prosecution after details of their claims were disclosed.
- Lord Tebbit, a Eurosceptic and former Chairman of the Conservative Party, urged voters to snub the main three political parties in the upcoming EU Parliament election. Tebbit, who in March 2009 said that he would vote for the UK Independence Party (UKIP), said "Local elections, the Great British public should just treat as normal" but suggested using the European election to send a message to the implicated parties. Tebbit pointed out that there were a series of smaller parties people could vote for in addition to UKIP, including the Green Party, but he urged against voting for the British National Party.
- Lord Foulkes, when being interviewed for BBC News by Carrie Gracie to defend Michael Martin, asked Gracie how much money she earned. When she said she earned £92,000, Foulkes said: "£92,000? So you're paid nearly twice as much as an MP to come on and talk this nonsense." Gracie defended herself by saying that she paid for all of her phone calls and "understood what public sector money is about".
- Anthony Steen, Conservative MP for Totnes, told BBC Radio 4's The World at One that he 'didn't see what all the fuss is about,' and suggested that the public were 'jealous' of his house that he compared to Balmoral Castle, a royal residence in Scotland. David Cameron, Conservative party leader, disapproved strongly of his statement, saying, 'One more squeak like that and he will have the whip taken away from him so fast his feet won't touch the ground.' As a result of his involvement in the scandal, he declined to contest the next general election.

=== Resignations and disciplinary action ===
==== Resignation of the Speaker ====
The resignation of Michael Martin, Speaker of the House of Commons, followed after he was pressured to step down for approving the allowances system that MPs have manipulated with questionable claims of expenses. The pressure and viable threats of a proposed vote of no confidence in Martin ultimately forced his resignation. Michael Martin's response to the handling of the expense crisis was not well received by the majority of the House. He attacked MPs in Parliament who defended The Daily Telegraph for publishing details of expenses and allowances. Martin then concluded his part in the debate over how to handle the expense scandal, by announcing that the Commons clerk had referred the matter of the leaked information to the Metropolitan Police Commissioner. Overall, Martin appeared to be more concerned with the nature of the leak of the information, which led to the Telegraph's publishing details of MPs' expenses and allowances, rather than offering an anticipated apology or explanation.

The majority of the MPs felt Martin's defensive approach and attacks on various MPs as whistleblowers and the backbenchers was a clear indication that Martin was no longer able to lead the House with the required impartiality. MPs from his own majority party, Labour, and the minority opposition party, the Conservatives, felt he had lost the confidence of the public and the House in general. Martin was the first Speaker to be forced out of the office by a motion of no confidence since John Trevor in 1695. Despite apologising to the public on behalf of the House of Commons on 18 May, Martin announced his resignation as Speaker of the House of Commons and as Member of Parliament for Glasgow North East the following day, both effective 21 June.

==== Cabinet and Ministerial resignations ====
- Jacqui Smith announced that she would step down as Home Secretary after the European elections, but would contest her seat at the next election. She lost her seat to a Conservative.
- Hazel Blears announced on 3 June that she would step down as Secretary of State for Communities and Local Government.
- Tony McNulty resigned from his position as Minister for Employment during the cabinet reshuffle on 5 June 2009. He lost his seat at the subsequent general election.
- Geoff Hoon left his position as Secretary of State for Transport during the cabinet reshuffle on 5 June 2009, in order for him to spend more time on European and international issues with him being considered a possible candidate as the next British member of the European Commission. He did not stand at the 2010 election.
- Kitty Ussher resigned as Exchequer Secretary to the Treasury on 17 June, after only 8 days in the position, following details of avoiding capital gains tax being published. She did not stand at the 2010 election.
- David Laws was the last to resign from the cabinet for expenses related issues, one year after the other cabinet resignations. A Liberal Democrat frontbencher appointed to the position of Chief Secretary to the Treasury following the 2010 general election, he resigned 16 days later when the Telegraph reported that he had claimed over £40,000 on his expenses in the form of second home costs, from 2004 to late 2009, during which time he had been renting rooms at properties owned by his long-term partner, James Lundie.

==== Labour backbenchers ====
The Labour Party formed a three-person panel of its National Executive Committee (NEC) in order to investigate some of its MPs who were referred to it over expenses allegations, which quickly became known as the "Star Chamber" (a reference to the court of the same name employed by English monarchs to dispense summary justice in the 16th and 17th centuries). Individual cases (in alphabetical order) include:

- Ben Chapman announced on 21 May 2009 that he would stand down at the next election, while maintaining that he had done nothing wrong; he said he would resign because the story in the Telegraph had been hurtful to his family, friends and local party members. He was the first Labour MP who announced he would stand down.
- David Chaytor announced that he would not stand for re-election, and was also barred from standing for Labour at the next general election. Charged with three alleged offences under section 17 of the Theft Act 1968 ("false accounting"), on 3 December 2010 he pleaded guilty to claiming rent for a house he in fact owned, using a fake tenancy agreement with his daughter. He was sentenced on 7 January 2011 to an 18-month jail sentence. His sentence may have been more lenient than the maximum seven years because of his guilty plea.
- Harry Cohen announced he would not stand for re-election. He said the strain caused by the criticism over his expenses, and the formal investigation into his claims, were the main factors behind his departure. He was subsequently barred from receiving his MP's resettlement grant, after being censured for his claims on a second home.
- Jim Devine was deselected on 16 June following a disciplinary hearing by the Labour party "star chamber". He had been charged with two alleged offences under section 17 of the Theft Act 1968 ("false accounting"). He was duly convicted of two charges of false accounting and on 31 March 2011 was sentenced to 16 months imprisonment
- Ian Gibson was also barred from representing Labour at the next general election and de-selected. He was said to be "deeply disappointed". On 5 June, Gibson announced his resignation as an MP, forcing a by-election to be held in his Norwich North constituency on 23 July 2009, which Labour went on to lose to the Conservatives.
- Eric Illsley on 8 February 2011, announced his resignation as an MP, forcing a by-election to be held in his Barnsley Central constituency, after pleading guilty to charges of false accounting. He was later jailed.
- Denis MacShane on 5 November 2012, announced his resignation as an MP, forcing a by-election to be held in his Rotherham constituency, following a recommendation from the Standards and Privileges Committee that he be suspended for 12 months for submitting false expenses invoices. He was later jailed.
- Anne Moffat on 22 January 2010, Moffat was deselected by her East Lothian constituency party, over her travel expenses.
- Margaret Moran decided not to contest the next election, and was also barred from standing for Labour. On 13 October 2010, the Telegraph reported that Moran would be prosecuted over her expenses. In 2012, Moran was declared unfit to stand trial due to her mental health, which was profoundly affected by the scandal.
- Elliot Morley announced on 29 May that he would not stand for re-election, and was also barred from standing for Labour at the next general election by the NEC's "star chamber". He was charged with two alleged offences under section 17 of the Theft Act 1968 ("false accounting"). On 7 April 2011, Morley pleaded guilty to two counts of false accounting, and on 20 May 2011, was sentenced to 16 months' imprisonment.

==== Conservatives ====
- On 14 May, Andrew MacKay, the Conservative MP for Bracknell, resigned as parliamentary aide to David Cameron over what he described as "unacceptable" expenses claims made by him. Subsequently, he decided to stand down at the next general election. His wife, Julie Kirkbride, who represented Bromsgrove, decided on 28 May 2009 that she too would not stand at the next general election.
- Douglas Hogg announced on 19 May that he would retire from Parliament at the next general election.
- Anthony Steen announced on 20 May that he would retire from Parliament at the next general election.
- Sir Peter Viggers announced on 20 May that he would retire from Parliament at the next general election.
- Husband and wife Conservative backbenchers Sir Nicholas and Lady Ann Winterton announced their intention to stand down at the next election.
- Christopher Fraser stated he would stand down to "care for his ill wife".
- Ian Taylor announced he would retire at the next general election although not because of the expenses issue (see link below). He had been claiming and had openly declared the maximum allowed for a second home allowance for a London home for four years between 2003 and 2008. His main residence was near Guildford in West Horsley.

==== Peers ====
- Amir Bhatia, Baron Bhatia was suspended from the House of Lords for eight months and told to repay £27,446.
- Tony Clarke, Baron Clarke of Hampstead admitted that he "fiddled" his expenses to make up for not being paid a salary.
- Paul White, Baron Hanningfield was charged with two alleged offences under section 17 of the Theft Act 1968 ("false accounting"). He stepped down from his frontbench role on learning of the charges on 5 February 2010. On 26 May 2011, Lord Hanningfield was found guilty on six counts, and on 1 July 2011, was sentenced to 9 months' imprisonment.
- Swraj Paul, Baron Paul was suspended from the House of Lords for four months and ordered to pay back £41,982.
- John Taylor, Baron Taylor of Warwick pleaded not guilty to six charges of false accounting, but was convicted on 25 January 2011, and on 31 May 2011, was sentenced to 12 months' imprisonment.
- Glenys Thornton, Baroness Thornton has also been implicated in this controversy, having been reported to be claiming £22,000 a year in expenses by saying that her mother's bungalow in Yorkshire is her main home, amounting to around £130,000 since 2002. She was later cleared of any wrongdoing by Michael Pownall, the Clerk of Parliaments, after it was determined that she spent much of her time there while caring for her mother.
- Pola Uddin, Baroness Uddin faced a police investigation for alleged fraud for claiming at least £180,000 in expenses by designating an empty flat, and previously an allegedly non-existent property as her main residence. She was suspended from the House of Lords until the end of 2012 and told to repay £125,349.

=== Creation of the Independent Parliamentary Standards Authority (IPSA) ===
On 20 May 2009 Harriet Harman announced the creation of the Independent Parliamentary Standards Authority, intended to manage Members' expenses at an "arm's length" from the House, ending the historical self-policing by MPs of their expenses. The IPSA will be responsible for: paying MPs' annual salaries; drawing up, reviewing, and administering an MPs' allowances scheme; providing MPs with publicly available information relating to taxation issues; preparing the MPs' code of conduct relating to financial interests; and determining the procedures for investigations and complaints relating to MPs. Henceforth, there will therefore be two codes of conduct for MPs to follow: a non-statutory code drawn up by the House of Commons itself; and a statutory code drawn up by the IPSA. The IPSA will take over some of the functions previously undertaken by the Fees Office. It will not, however, determine the level of MPs' pay. That will remain a matter for the Senior Salaries Review Body which annually informs the Speaker of the House of Commons of the percentage increase to be awarded to MPs.

=== Criticism of the Independent Parliamentary Standards Authority (IPSA) ===
The Independent Parliamentary Standards Authority (IPSA) has been criticised for severely complicating the expenses claims process for MPs and their staff. Former Member of Parliament Paul Flynn recalled his experiences with IPSA upon its creation: "A monthly thirty-minute chore was complicated by ISPA into endless hours of tedious frustrating trawling through a bureaucratic morass of irrational rules" and he believed, "A simple five-part claims system was atomised into a hundred headings and sub-headings".

=== Surge in independent candidates ===
A surge in proposed independent candidates and enhanced profile of minority parties were noted in the press. In various cases these candidates stood in recognition of the loss of public goodwill suffered by established MPs and parties, and proposed to stand on "clean slate" or anti-sleaze platforms. In the immediate aftermath of the revelations, a Populus survey said that only 45% of people were committed to voting in the next general election (although 54% said they wanted an election as soon as possible), which had fallen by around a quarter since before the disclosures began. The Conservatives still maintained their lead over Labour, but support for the BNP was up. The poll showed that 19% of voters were prepared to vote outside of the main three parties, with the British National Party, Green Party of England and Wales, and UK Independence Party also hoping to capitalise, and was particularly pertinent because of the subsequent European Parliament election.

=== Effect on MPs and on the political structure ===
The expenses disclosures were published over an extended period of time, with the focus moving to different MPs daily. As a result, there was significant pressure on MPs who did not know whether, and for what, they would be discussed, as well as a general deepening hostility that grew over a relatively long period.

On 22 May 2009 Nadine Dorries, the Conservative MP for Mid Bedfordshire went on record in saying that many of her colleagues "feared a suicide" and that MPs were "beginning to crack". She likened the atmosphere in Westminster to that surrounding Senator Joseph McCarthy's "witch hunts" of suspected Communists during the 1950s. The comment led to a forceful rebuke by Conservative leader David Cameron, who stated that the anger and mood were warranted and that MPs should be more concerned about what the public were thinking.

On 23 May 2009 the Archbishop of Canterbury Rowan Williams warned about the potential effect of the controversy on the democratic process, and that "the continuing systematic humiliation of politicians itself threatens to carry a heavy price in terms of our ability to salvage some confidence in our democracy." On the same day writing in The Times, columnist and former MP Matthew Parris reflected that "extravagance, genuine mistake, sly acquisitiveness and outright criminal fraud are now jumbled together in the national mind as though there were no moral differences".

On 11 June 2009 ex-communities secretary Hazel Blears, who chose to resign from the government just before the English county council and European elections, said that she regretted the timing of her decision. She also stated that her decision to wear a brooch with the words 'rocking the boat' on the same day as the resignation was a "stupid thing to do". Speaking to the Manchester Evening News she said of the brooch "It was a brooch my husband had given me. I'd had four weeks of intense media pressure, the like of which I have never known, not just on me but on my husband, my dad, my family. At that point I'd had enough. It was a stupid thing to do but I think it was just trying to put a brave face on—not going out cowed on the basis of expenses claims that genuinely are not true."

74 MPs lost their seats in the 2010 general election.

=== Reform proposals ===
On 25 May 2009, Health Secretary Alan Johnson (seen as a possible candidate for Labour leadership) stated that one response to the controversy should be a full review of the electoral and political system. He proposed as part of this, a referendum on changing the electoral system to Alternative vote plus.

David Cameron, the Conservative Party leader of the opposition, set out his proposal for reform in The Guardian. He proposed strengthening the power of backbenchers over the government, and other measures as part of 'a radical redistribution of power'. Writing in The Guardian on 27 May 2009, Liberal Democrat leader Nick Clegg suggested cancelling MPs holidays until 'the constitutional crisis sparked by the row over expenses is resolved'. Setting out a week by week plan, Clegg made wide-ranging proposals, from placing a cap on individual donations to political parties, to replacing the House of Lords with an elected Senate, to allowing a referendum on electoral reform.

The major political parties and some minority parties (not UKIP) have stated they will publicly disclose information on expenses claims by UK Members of the European Parliament. The proposed disclosures vary between parties.

A study of the possible influence of the voting system on MPs behaviour concluded that those MPs with the safest seats were twice as likely as those with the most marginal seats to be involved in the expenses row.

== Police and tax authority responses ==
The UK tax authority HM Revenue and Customs (HMRC) identified around 40 MPs, including the former Chancellor of the Exchequer, as having claimed for their tax return costs. A minority of these affirmed they paid tax on the sums involved; HMRC confirmed they were investigating former Chancellor Alistair Darling's tax claims, along with those of others involved. Darling claimed the costs of preparing his tax return as an expense of his office, although tax law regards them as personal costs. Lord Millett, a former Law Lord, described Darling's claim as "astounding", and guidance to ministers in 2005 had stated that such expenses were not claimable for tax purposes.

The Economic and Specialist Crime branch of the Metropolitan Police Service investigated claims made by a few MPs.

=== Criminal charges ===
Keir Starmer, then Director of Public Prosecutions for England and Wales and future Labour Prime Minister, announced on 5 February 2010 criminal charges of false accounting would be brought against Labour MPs Elliot Morley, David Chaytor and Jim Devine, and Conservative peer Lord Hanningfield, in relation to their expense claims. He said that the Crown Prosecution Service had concluded that "there is sufficient evidence to bring criminal charges and that it is in the public interest to charge the individuals concerned". All four denied wrongdoing and said they would fight the charges. A joint statement from Morley, Chaytor and Devine said "we totally refute any charges that we have committed an offence and we will defend our position robustly", while Hanningfield said "all the claims I have ever made were made in good faith".

==== David Chaytor ====
David Chaytor (Labour) appealed along with Jim Devine and Elliot Morley to the Supreme Court of the United Kingdom that his actions were protected by parliamentary privilege. The Supreme Court ruled against them and he subsequently pleaded guilty to charges of false accounting a total of £18,350, and was sentenced to 18 months imprisonment.

==== Jim Devine ====
Jim Devine (Labour) pleaded not guilty and was found guilty on two counts but cleared of a third (relating to £360) on 10 February 2011. He had fraudulently claimed a total of £8,385 and on 31 March 2011 was sentenced to 16 months imprisonment.

==== Eric Illsley ====
Eric Illsley (Labour) pleaded guilty to charges of false accounting totalling £14,000 and was sentenced at Southwark Crown Court to 12 months imprisonment.

==== Denis MacShane ====
Denis MacShane (Labour) was jailed for six months on 23 December 2013 for expenses fraud, after admitting submitting 19 fake receipts amounting to £12,900, making him the fifth MP to get a prison sentence as a result of the scandal.

==== Margaret Moran ====
Margaret Moran (Labour). On 6 September 2011 the Crown Prosecution Service (CPS) announced that Moran would face 21 criminal charges 15 of false accounting and six charges of forgery. She was summoned to appear at Westminster Magistrates' Court on 19 September 2011 where she was reported to have wept throughout the hearing. Moran was sent to Southwark Crown Court for trial on 30 October 2011. She failed to appear and a 'not guilty' plea was entered by default in her absence. A date for the trial of an issue was set for 18 April with a directions hearing set for 15 December. On 15 December 2011 Mr Justice Saunders was informed that psychiatrists considered Moran unfit to plead with the defence contending that the trial should therefore not proceed. In April 2012, after receiving evidence from a number of psychiatrists, the judge determined that Moran was not fit to plead. On 13 November 2012 a jury found her guilty of the acts alleged. In December, she was sentenced to a two-year supervision and treatment order, the judge commenting that although some might feel she had "got away with it", the court had acted "in accordance with the law of the land and on the basis of the evidence that it hears". Her false claims totalled more than £53,000, the largest fraud of any MP in the expenses scandal.

==== Elliot Morley ====
Elliot Morley (Labour) admitted two charges of dishonesty and was sentenced at Southwark Crown Court on 20 May 2011 to 16 months imprisonment. His false claims totalled £31,333.54. On 8 June 2011, he was expelled from the Privy Council, the first expulsion since Edgar Speyer in 1921, and thereby removing his right to use the honorific title The Right Honourable.

==== Lord Taylor of Warwick ====
Lord Taylor of Warwick (Conservative) pleaded not guilty to six charges of false accounting, but was convicted at Southwark Crown Court on 25 January 2011. His false claims amounted to £11,277 and on 31 May 2011 he was sentenced to 12 months imprisonment.

==== Lord Hanningfield ====
Paul White, Baron Hanningfield (Conservative) pleaded not guilty to six charges of false accounting, but was convicted at Chelmsford Crown Court on 26 May 2011. He was given a 9-month sentence which was confirmed when his appeal against the conviction and sentence failed in July 2011. As a low-risk prisoner he was released in September 2011 on home detention after serving a quarter of the sentence. After repaying the wrongly claimed £30,254.50 he returned to the House of Lords in April 2012.

== Independent audit ==
An independent panel chaired by former civil servant Sir Thomas Legg was established following the row, with a remit to examine all claims relating to the second homes allowance between 2004 and 2008. The panel published its findings on 12 October as MPs returned to Westminster following the summer recess, with each MP receiving a letter in which they were informed whether or not they would be required to repay any expenses they had claimed. Among those who had to repay expenses were Prime Minister Gordon Brown who claimed £12,415 for cleaning and gardening costs and Liberal Democrat leader Nick Clegg who was asked to pay back £910 from a £3,900 claim he made for gardening between 2006 and 2009. Conservative leader David Cameron was asked to provide more information regarding over-claiming in 2006 when he changed his mortgage, he had already repaid £218. Former Home Secretary Jacqui Smith apologised to the House of Commons after a separate investigation found that she had breached expenses rules over claims made on her second home.

MPs from all main political parties expressed their anger at Legg's decision to retroactively enforce the rules, meaning some payouts already allowed were now treated as violations. Many senior MPs questioned Legg's authority and cast doubt on the legality of his findings. It was reported that some MPs, including Tory Jonathan Djanogly would challenge the requests to repay their claims. But both the Labour and Conservative leaders urged their party members to pay back any overpaid expenses. Gordon Brown said that MPs should "deal with" the retroactive rules, while David Cameron warned that any member of the Conservative Party who was unwilling to comply with the rules would not be able to stand for the party at the next general election.

== Awards ==
At the 2010 British Press Awards, The Daily Telegraph was named the "National Newspaper of the Year" for its coverage of the MPs expenses scandal, which was also referred to as the "Scoop of the Year". William Lewis won "Journalist of the Year" for his reporting role as well.

== MPs accused of editing their Wikipedia pages ==
In May 2010 it was reported in The Daily Telegraph that a number of MPs and their staff have been caught attempting to edit their personal Wikipedia pages to remove references to their expenses claims. Wikipedia staff found that a number of IP addresses associated with the Parliamentary Estate had been attempting to remove potentially embarrassing information surrounding MPs expenses claims from their Wikipedia profiles. The article made specific allegations against Chris Grayling (Con), Margaret Moran (Lab) and Joan Ryan (Lab).

== See also ==
- Salaries of members of the United Kingdom Parliament
- List of expenses claims in the United Kingdom parliamentary expenses scandal
- 2010 United Kingdom general election § Effect of the expenses scandal
- On Expenses, BBC Four dramatisation of the scandal
