= Paul White, Baron Hanningfield =

British politician (1940–2024)

The Right Honourable The Lord Hanningfield DL

Member of the House of Lords
- Lord Temporal
- Life peerage 31 July 1998 – 20 October 2024

Leader of Essex County Council
- In office February 2000 – February 2010
- Preceded by: Mervyn Juliff
- Succeeded by: Peter Martin
- In office April 1998 – May 1999
- Preceded by: Mervyn Juliff
- Succeeded by: Mervyn Juliff

Conservative Group Leader on Essex County Council
- In office 20 January 1994 – February 2010
- Preceded by: Peter Martin
- Succeeded by: Peter Martin

Member of Essex County Council for Stock
- In office 15 April 1970 – 29 July 2011
- Preceded by: William Hodgins
- Succeeded by: Ian Grundy

Personal details
- Born: Paul Edward Winston White; 16 September 1940 Chelmsford, England
- Died: 20 October 2024 (aged 84)
- Party: Conservative (until 2010); Non-affiliated (2010–2024)
- Education: King Edward VI Grammar School, Chelmsford

Paul Edward Winston White, Baron Hanningfield (16 September 1940 – 20 October 2024), was a British politician and farmer. As a member of the Conservative Party, he served in various leadership roles in local government in Essex and was influential in establishing the Local Government Association. He was a member of Essex County Council from 1970 and 2011, and served in frontbench roles in the House of Lords after being nominated for a life peerage in 1998.

In the parliamentary expenses scandal, Hanningfield was convicted of false accounting in 2011, sentenced to nine months' imprisonment and expelled from the Conservative Party. He was twice suspended from the House of Lords for expenses fraud.

== Early life and career ==
Paul Edward Winston White was born on 16 September 1940 in Chelmsford, Essex, to Edward Ernest William White and Irene Joyce Gertrude White (née Williamson), into a farming family with eight older sisters. He was given the middle name Winston after his father's hero, Winston Churchill. The White family had been established in the village of West Hanningfield for centuries.

White was educated at King Edward VI Grammar School, Chelmsford. He received a Nuffield Scholarship for agriculture and studied in the United States, then took up pig farming in West Hanningfield; he was named the youngest pig farmer in Britain at the age of 15. White joined the National Farmers' Union (NFU), chairing its quality pigs committee by the age of 22, and became the chairman of Essex Young Farmers in 1962.

== Political career ==
White served as a member of the executive of the Chelmsford Conservative Association from 1962 to 1999. First elected to Essex County Council in 1970, he chaired the council's agricultural-estates and education committees. He served as chairman of the council from 1989 to 1992, and afterwards as the Conservative group leader.

While serving as a county councillor, White held senior positions in local government. He chaired the Council of Local Education Authorities from 1990 to 1992, and the Eastern Area of the Further Education Funding Council for England from 1992 to 1997. White was the leader of the Association of County Councils from 1995 to 1997. He helped to establish the Local Government Association and served as its deputy chair and Conservative group leader from 1997 to 2001. White was nominated to the European Committee of the Regions in 1998, and served as vice president of the committee's European People's Party group. In 2001, he co-founded and became the chairman of Localis, a local-government think tank that aimed to "challenge the growing powers of national government and unaccountable quangos".

In 1998, White was nominated for a life peerage by Conservative leader William Hague in recognition of his work in local government. He was created Baron Hanningfield, of Chelmsford in the County of Essex, on 31 July 1998, taking the name of the village in which he lived. In the House of Lords, Hanningfield served as a Conservative Party whip and a spokesman on education and transport.

Hanningfield served as the leader of Essex County Council from 1998 to 1999, and from 2000 until his resignation in 2010. As council leader, he set up a scheme to reopen closed Post Office branches, and announced plans for a "Bank of Essex" in partnership with Santander that would help local firms get finance during the Great Recession. In 2009, the Countryside Alliance awarded Hanningfield the Rural Vision Award for his work to protect and promote rural communities. He was the county councillor for the electoral division of Stock (Chelmsford Rural No. 2) from 15 April 1970 until his disqualification on 29 July 2011 after being convicted for false accounting. The seat was retained by the Conservative Party at the subsequent September 2011 by-election.

== Expenses scandals ==
In February 2010, Hanningfield was charged with false accounting, under section 17 of the Theft Act 1968, in connection with claims for overnight accommodation from parliamentary authorities. He immediately resigned as the Lords opposition spokesman for communities, local government, and transport. He also resigned as the leader of Essex County Council, and the Conservative party whip was withdrawn from him on 5 February.

On 27 May, Hanningfield, along with MPs Jim Devine, Elliot Morley and David Chaytor, appeared at Southwark Crown Court for a preliminary hearing. Hanningfield was charged with six counts of false accounting and his trial at Chelmsford Crown Court began on 16 May 2011. He was accused of falsely claiming for overnight stays in London when he had in fact returned to his home in Essex; on one occasion for which he claimed reimbursement for an overnight stay in London, he was in fact on a plane to India. Hanningfield denied all charges, telling police that he had been "singled out"; in an August 2009 interview, he told police that he had "done the same as 500 or 600 other peers".

Hanningfield was found guilty on all six counts of false accounting. On 1 July 2011, he was sentenced to nine months' imprisonment, mitigated by his poor health, for falsely claiming £13,379 in parliamentary expenses. His appeal against the conviction was rejected by the Court of Appeal, and he was expelled from the Conservative Party. Hanningfield and Lord Taylor of Warwick, a fellow former Conservative peer, were released from prison on home detention curfew in September 2011, after having served a quarter of their sentences. They were the only two peers to be imprisoned over the parliamentary expenses scandal. Hanningfield was suspended from the House of Lords for nine months with effect from 1 July, subsequent to a report of the Committee for Privileges and Conduct that detailed £30,254.50 of "false claims" for night-subsistence expenses between July 2007 and April 2009.

Essex County Council initiated a separate investigation into Hanningfield after discovering that he had spent £286,000 on a council credit card between 2005 and 2010. He was arrested in September 2011, a few days after his early release from prison, and began legal action against Essex Police for wrongful arrest. The investigation was dropped in November 2012 over insufficient evidence. Hanningfield sought £6,500 in compensation from the police and was awarded £3,500.

In December 2011, the House Committee of the House of Lords recommended that Hanningfield and Baroness Uddin, another peer implicated in the expenses scandal, should not be allowed back to the Lords until their wrongly claimed expenses were repaid. Hanningfield returned to the House of Lords in April 2012 after repaying £30,000. In September 2012, Hanningfield was ordered under the Proceeds of Crime Act 2002 to repay a further £37,158.50, covering a six-year period of expenses, or face 15 months' imprisonment.

Following Hanningfield's return to Parliament, a Daily Mirror investigation found that, on 11 of 19 days in July 2013, he attended the House of Lords for less than 40 minutes but nonetheless claimed the £300 daily attendance allowance and travel costs, and did not speak in a debate from his return in April 2012 until October 2013. An investigation by the House of Lords commissioner for standards found that he did not undertake parliamentary work on those days and had "failed to act on his personal honour" by wrongly claiming expenses, and a report of the Committee for Privileges and Conduct recommended that he repay the £3,300 wrongly claimed and be suspended from the House of Lords until the end of the Parliament (the maximum sanction available). His suspension took effect on 13 May 2014 and lasted until the dissolution of Parliament in 2015. A court case over the expenses claims was abandoned in July 2016 after Parliament claimed exclusive cognisance over the matters indicted.

== Personal life and death ==
Hanningfield never married. In 2011, he lived in West Hanningfield, Essex, with his Bernese Mountain Dog Jefferson; he told his trial that year: "As I lived alone I wouldn't survive without my dog – it's someone I could talk to and walk with." He was made a member of the court of the University of Essex in 1980, and was appointed a deputy lieutenant (DL) of Essex in 1990.

Hanningfield died on 20 October 2024, at the age of 84.
