= Denis MacShane =

British politician (born 1948)

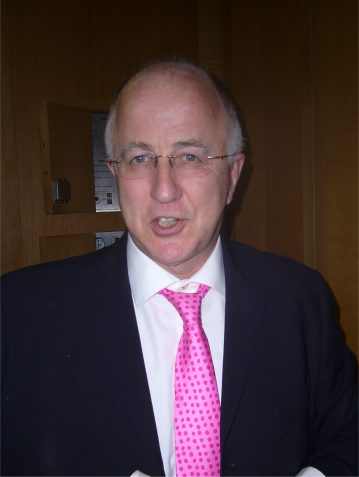
- MacShane in 2008

Minister of State for Europe
- In office 3 April 2002 – 5 May 2005
- Prime Minister: Tony Blair
- Preceded by: Peter Hain
- Succeeded by: Douglas Alexander

Parliamentary Under-Secretary of State for the Balkans and Latin America
- In office 11 June 2001 – 3 April 2002
- Prime Minister: Tony Blair
- Preceded by: Office established
- Succeeded by: Bill Rammell

Member of Parliament for Rotherham
- In office 5 May 1994 – 5 November 2012
- Preceded by: James Boyce
- Succeeded by: Sarah Champion

Personal details
- Born: Josef Denis Matyjaszek; 21 May 1948 (age 78) Glasgow, Scotland
- Party: Independent (since 2012)
- Other political affiliations: Labour (expelled in 2012)
- Spouses: Liliana Kłaptoć (1983–1986); Nathalie Pham (1987–2003)
- Domestic partners: Carol Barnes (1975–1981); Joan Smith (2003–2010); Vicky Pryce (2012-present)
- Children: 4 daughters; 1 son
- Education: Merton College, Oxford; Birkbeck, University of London
- Website: Official website

Denis MacShane (born Josef Denis Matyjaszek; 21 May 1948) is a British former politician, author, commentator and convicted criminal who served as Minister of State for Europe from 2002 to 2005. He was Member of Parliament (MP) for Rotherham from 1994 to his forced resignation in 2012.

Born in Glasgow to an Irish mother and Polish father who died from war-related illness in 1958, MacShane was educated on a Middlesex County scholarship at St Benedict's School, Ealing and studied at Merton College, Oxford. He worked as a BBC journalist and trade unionist before completing a PhD at Birkbeck, University of London. He contested the Solihull constituency in October 1974 but was unsuccessful. After failing to be selected to contest a constituency at the 1992 general election, he was elected to parliament for Rotherham at a 1994 by-election. Following the 2001 general election, he was appointer a junior minister at the Foreign and Commonwealth Office. In April 2002, he became Minister of State for Europe and was appointed to the Privy Council. He returned to the backbenches following the 2005 general election.

In November 2012, Labour suspended MacShane when the Standards and Privileges Committee found he had submitted 19 false invoices "plainly intended to deceive" the parliamentary expenses authority. The allegations had been investigated for 20 months by the Metropolitan Police. After the Commons upheld the complaint, he announced his intention to resign as MP for Rotherham and from the Privy Council. In November 2013, he pleaded guilty at the Old Bailey to false accounting by submitting false receipts for £12,900. On 23 December, he was sentenced to six months in prison. He served four months of his sentence in HM Prison Belmarsh and HM Prison Brixton, and the rest by wearing an electronic tag.

== Early life and career ==
MacShane was born on 21 May 1948 in Glasgow as Josef Denis Matyjaszek to an Irish mother, Isobel MacShane, and Jozef Matyjaszek, a Pole who had fought in the Second World War and remained in exile, taking British nationality in 1950. He was educated at the independent St Benedict's School in Ealing, before going on to study at Merton College, Oxford.

MacShane worked for the BBC from 1969 to 1977, including as a newsreader and reporter on Wolverhampton Wanderers for BBC Radio Birmingham. He changed his surname to his mother's maiden name at the request of his employers. He was fired by the BBC after using a fake name to call the radio phone-in programme he worked on at the time. During the call, MacShane accused leading Conservative politician Reginald Maudling, who had been forced to resign as a frontbencher after accusations of financial impropriety in 1972, of being a crook. The MP threatened to sue as a result.

MacShane supported the Solidarity trade union in Poland, where he was arrested in 1982 for attending a demonstration and deported. He became an activist for the National Union of Journalists and later its president 1978 to 1979. He was policy director of the International Metal Workers' Federation from 1980 to 1992, and he completed a PhD in international economics at Birkbeck, University of London in 1990.

== Political career ==
MacShane first contested a parliamentary seat at the October 1974 general election, where he failed to win Solihull. In 1984, he was on the short list for Labour Party Communications Director, but Peter Mandelson was appointer instead. For the 1992 general election, he attempted to secure a nomination for the Coventry South East constituency, then Neath, and finally Rotherham, though all the attempts were unsuccessful.

MacShane was elected to the House of Commons in the 1994 Rotherham by-election. He was a member of the Deregulation Select Committee 1996–1997, and served as Parliamentary Private Secretary to a succession of ministers in the 1997–2001 Parliament.

=== Parliamentary Under-Secretary of State at the Foreign Office ===
Following the 2001 general election, MacShane was appointed Parliamentary under-secretary of state for Foreign and Commonwealth Affairs on 11 June 2001, with responsibility for the Balkans and Latin America. He caused some embarrassment to the government in 2002 by describing President Hugo Chávez of Venezuela as a 'ranting, populist demagogue' and compared him to Benito Mussolini during a failed military coup attempt to depose the democratically elected president. Afterwards, he had to make clear that, as minister with responsibility for Latin America, the government deplored the coup attempt.

In November 2001, an article supportive of the war in Afghanistan was published in The Observer under the name of Muslim Labour MP Khalid Mahmood, headlined "The Five Myths Muslims Must Deny". A few days later however, it was revealed that the article had not in fact been written by Mahmood, but by MacShane; Mahmood had agreed to put his name to the article after Lord Ahmed of Rotherham had refused. Mahmood's actions were condemned by Inayat Bunglawala from the Muslim Council of Britain, who said that "[after] Lord Ahmed refused, MacShane then found Mahmood—universally regarded as being not exactly the brightest spark in parliament—to be a more willing instrument for his scheme".

=== Minister for Europe ===
In 2002, he became Minister for Europe in the reshuffle caused by the resignation of Estelle Morris. He was appointer a member of the Privy Council in 2005.

MacShane was a supporter of the 2003 invasion of Iraq and strongly supported Tony Blair's foreign policy, including in relation to the Middle East. Later in 2003, he criticised Muslim community leaders, saying they did not do enough to condemn acts of Islamic terrorism.

During a meeting of Durham Labour Students in 2004, MacShane described Gordon Brown's five economic tests for joining the European single currency as, "a bit of a giant red herring." When contacted by The Scotsman newspaper about whether or not he made the comments, he responded: "Jesus Christ, no. I mean, 'red herring' is not one of my favourite metaphors. If you think any Labour MP saying the Prime Minister's most important policy is a red herring, then they would not survive long in the job." He had been recorded on a dictaphone, and the tape was played on both the Today programme and BBC News 24.

In March 2005, MacShane signed on to the Henry Jackson Society principles, advocating a proactive approach to the spread of liberal democracy across the world, including by military intervention. The society also supports "European military modernisation and integration under British leadership".

Following the 2005 general election, MacShane was dropped from the government. After returning to the backbenches in 2005, he was appointer as a delegate to the Council of Europe and the NATO Parliamentary Assembly. MacShane wrote in Tribune magazine in 2006, "I have no idea why I was removed as a minister, and it does not worry me in the slightest."

=== Other issues and incidents ===
While MacShane has campaigned on the issue of sex trafficking, he was accused of repeatedly using false statistics in order to inflate the number of female victims. In January 2007, he stated, "According to Home Office estimates, 25,000 sex slaves currently work in the massage parlours and brothels of Britain." He repeated the figure in a 2008 debate, attributing it to the Daily Mirror newspaper. It was later claimed that no such figure exists as an estimate.

On 17 December 2008, he initiated a debate about Britain's libel laws in Parliament. Specifically, he described how the United Kingdom has become a destination for libel tourists as well as how various jurisdictions in the United States (including the U.S. states of New York and Illinois and the federal government) were ready to pass measures designed to halt, at the minimum, reciprocal enforcement of civil judgments related to libel with the United Kingdom, and quite possibly, to allow countersuit, and the award of treble damages in the United States against any person bringing a libel action in a non-US court against US publications or websites.

On 25 August 2010, The Guardian reported that MacShane admitted he was the MP involved in an incident with a volunteer with the new Independent Parliamentary Standards Authority: "On 11 May a volunteer had an encounter with an MP who was described as 'very difficult ... disruptive [and] angry" during an induction session. The official report said: 'At the 10-minute mark the volunteer burst into tears and a staff member [from Ipsa] attempted to intervene. When the staff member offered to help, the MP dismissed him as 'condescending', at which point another staff member pulled the volunteer (still in tears) out of the session.' MacShane apologised for his conduct.

MacShane was publicly criticised by the Association of Political Thought for wrongly accusing London School of Economics professor of political and gender theory Anne Phillips of supporting prostitution and filling the minds of her students with "poisonous drivel". As evidence of her supposed support for the latter, he cited a question from an LSE reading list about the ethical differences between legal waged labour and prostitution. MacShane later admitted that he had taken the question 'out of context'. Labour MP Fiona Mactaggart subsequently called Professor Phillips' views "frankly nauseating" on the basis of the same evidence.

MacShane was a Patron of Supporters of Nuclear Energy, and supported the development of a nuclear industry manufacturing centre in Rotherham. MacShane was employed as an advisor by United Utilities, Britain's largest water company, during 2006 and 2007.

MacShane was MP for Rotherham during the period of large-scale sexual abuse of children in the constituency. After the publication of the Independent Inquiry into Child Sexual Exploitation in Rotherham he said in a BBC radio interview that no-one had come to him with child abuse allegations during that period, but that he should have been more involved in the issue. Saying that he had done too little, he said he had been aware of what he saw as the problems of cousin marriage and the oppression of women within parts of the Muslim community in Britain, but: "Perhaps yes, as a true Guardian reader, and liberal leftie, I suppose I didn't want to raise that too hard. I think there was a culture of not wanting to rock the multicultural community boat if I may put it like that."

Another issue on which MacShane was active as a parliamentarian was combating antisemitism. He was chair of the inquiry panel of the All-Party Parliamentary Group against Antisemitism, which reported in September 2006. In March 2009, he became chairman of a think-tank on antisemitism, the European Institute for the Study of Contemporary Antisemitism.

MacShane was an advisory board member of the now defunct Just Journalism, an organisation focused on how UK media reported Israel and the Middle East. Just Journalism had strong links with the Henry Jackson Society, and shared an office with it.

== Parliamentary expenses, resignation and conviction ==
=== Newspaper reports and general parliamentary review ===
As part of the review of all MPs expenses, MacShane was ordered to repay £1,507.73 in wrongfully claimed expenses, with his appeals against the ruling being rejected. He was also revealed to have passed twelve invoices from the "European Policy Institute" for "research and translation" expenses to the parliamentary authorities, and claimed for eight laptop computers in three years. A number of newspapers stated that the EPI was "controlled" by MacShane's brother, Edmund Matyjaszek, a claim which MacShane denied: "The EPI was set up 20 years ago by a network of people on the Left working in Europe and the US... Ed is my brother, but simply administrates it." MacShane later stated his brother had no role in the EPI.

MacShane had written an article for The Guardian in which he played down the expenses scandal, writing, "There will come a moment when moats and manure, bath plugs and tampons will be seen as a wonderful moment of British fiddling, but more on a Dad's Army scale than the real corruption of politics." In 2008, MacShane supported House of Commons Speaker Michael Martin, calling for Conservative Douglas Carswell to be disciplined for saying that Martin should resign for failing to do enough to prevent the abuse of parliamentary expense claims.

=== Resumed parliamentary investigation ===
At the end of their enquiry, the Crown Prosecution Service (CPS) decided to close the file. MacShane was re-admitted to the Labour Party in July 2012, but was then suspended again by the Labour Party on 2 November 2012 after a parliamentary committee found that he had submitted 19 false invoices for expenses that were "plainly intended to deceive".

The invoices had been for "research and translation" work carried out by the "European Policy Institute". However, the Parliamentary Commissioner for Standards found the sums of money covered other expenditure, and were "broad estimates of what the MP judged he had spent, rather than receipted items". The European Policy Institute "did not exist", and its bank account was controlled by MacShane. The commissioner stated, "In effect, he was sending the invoice to himself and writing his own cheque." MacShane had created the invoices himself and signed them under a false name.

Later that day, MacShane announced that he would be resigning from Parliament. He said: "I have decided for the sake of my wonderful constituency of Rotherham and my beloved Labour Party to resign as an MP by applying for the Chiltern Hundreds or as guided by the House authorities. I love the House of Commons and I hope by resigning I can serve by showing that MPs must take responsibility for their mistakes and accept the consequences of being in breach of the House rules".

He said in a statement: "Clearly I deeply regret that the way I chose to be reimbursed for costs related to my work in Europe and in combating antisemitism, including being the Prime Minister's personal envoy, has been judged so harshly." However, the Standards and Privileges Committee stated that the Commons had placed strict conditions and limits on funding MPs' travel to Europe, MacShane was clearly aware of these rules, and concluded "Mr MacShane claimed in the way he did to ensure that his use of public funds for his European travel was not challenged" by sending misleading invoices to himself in order to claim the costs of travelling and to entertain European contacts.

=== Referral to police and conviction ===
It was reported on 14 October 2010 that the Parliamentary Commissioner for Standards (on instruction from the Standards and Privileges Committee) had referred an expenses-related complaint about MacShane from the British National Party to the Metropolitan Police. The matter referred was his claiming of expenses totalling £125,000 for his constituency office, the office being his garage. The Labour Party suspended MacShane from the parliamentary party pending the outcome.

In June 2011, The Daily Telegraph highlighted further discrepancies in MacShane's expenses which had been uncovered by former independent candidate Peter Thirlwall. As a result, he held an emergency meeting with House of Commons officials and agreed to repay a further £3,051.38. The lengthy investigation concluded on 4 July 2012 with an announcement that the Metropolitan Police would take no further action, but it was reported on 21 January 2013 that the police were to re-open the expenses claims investigation involving MacShane.

On 11 July 2013 the Crown Prosecution Service announced that MacShane would be charged with false accounting under the Theft Act 1968, involving the creation of £12,900 of fake receipts. He continued to write columns for The Guardian, as well as appearing on television programmes relating to European affairs both in Britain and in other European countries. On 18 November 2013 he pleaded guilty to false accounting at the Old Bailey, and on 23 December 2013 was jailed for six months. He served his sentence in HM Prison Belmarsh and HM Prison Brixton, and subsequently by wearing an electronic tag.

MacShane resigned his Privy Council membership in 2013, after discussions with the body's secretariat. After MacShane was forced to resign his seat, Martin Bright in The Jewish Chronicle wrote that his "fall from grace has been a blow for those who share his concerns about extremist politics, whether it is radical Islamism in the Middle East, neo-fascism at home or the rise of ultranationalist groups in Eastern Europe." In November 2013, Bright described MacShane as "one of" the Jewish community's "greatest champions".

=== European Parliament incident ===
Shortly after being released from prison in 2014, UKIP MEPs alleged MacShane was ejected from the premises of the European Parliament members' bar where he had been meeting UKIP leader Nigel Farage, after a British MEP accused him of loitering in the building "like a bad smell" and told officials he had no right to be there. MacShane was reported to be seeking a communications job.

== Books ==
In his 2014 book Prison Diaries MacShane detailed his life in prison, in which he claimed to hold the status of "politician prisoner". He has written more than ten books on European politics including three on Brexit about which he writes and broadcasts regularly in Britain and Europe. He is the author of several books on European politics, including Brexit: How Britain will Leave Europe, written in 2014, which warned that the EU referendum in the UK would result in a vote to quit Europe. His 2019 follow-up book, Brexiternity: The Uncertain Fate of Britain, argued that Brexit would dominate British politics, economics and international relations for years to come.

- Black and Front: journalists and race reporting (1978)
- Solidarity: Poland's Independent Trade Union (1981)
- François Mitterrand: Political Odyssey (1982)
- Power! Black Workers, Their Unions and the Struggle for Freedom in South Africa (1984) with Martin Plaut and David Ward
- International Labour and the Origins of the Cold War (1992)
- Global Business: Global Rights (1996)
- Heath (British Prime Ministers of the 20th Century) (2006)
- Globalising Hatred: The New Antisemitism (2009)
- Why Kosovo Still Matters (2011)
- Prison Diaries (2014)
- Brexit: How Britain will Leave Europe (2015)
- Brexiternity: The Uncertain Fate of Britain (2019)
- Must Labour Always Lose? (2021)
- Labour Takes Power: The Denis MacShane Diaries 1997–2001 (Biteback, 2023)

== Personal life ==
From 1975 to 1981 MacShane had a relationship with broadcaster Carol Barnes. Their daughter, Clare Barnes, died in March 2004 after her parachute failed to open on her 200th skydiving jump in Australia. In 1987, he married Nathalie Pham, an interpreter of French-Vietnamese origin; they have a son and three daughters. They divorced in 2003. His relationship with writer Joan Smith ended in 2010 after seven years. In 2012, he began a relationship with the economist Vicky Pryce, who had been married to the former Energy Secretary Chris Huhne. In his spare time, he enjoys skiing and running.

== See also ==
Other Members of Parliament found guilty of fraud during the 2009 expenses scandal:

- David Chaytor – Labour MP for Bury North from 1997 to 2010
- Jim Devine – Labour MP for Livingston from 2005 to 2010
- Eric Illsley – Labour MP for Barnsley Central from 1987 to 2011
- Margaret Moran – Labour MP for Luton South from 1997 to 2010
- Elliot Morley – Labour MP for Glanford and Scunthorpe from 1987 to 1997 and then Scunthorpe from 1997 to 2010
- John Taylor, Baron Taylor of Warwick (Conservative)
- Paul White, Baron Hanningfield (Conservative)

Parliament of the United Kingdom
Preceded by James Boyce	Member of Parliament for Rotherham; 1994–2012	Succeeded by Sarah Champion
Political offices
Preceded by Peter Hain	Minister of State for Europe; 2002–2005	Succeeded by Douglas Alexander
Trade union offices
Preceded by John Devine	President of the National Union of Journalists; 1978–1979	Succeeded by Jacob Ecclestone
Party political offices
Preceded by Gordon Marsden	Chair of the Fabian Society; 2001–2002	Succeeded by Paul Richards
