= St Ursula's Convent School =

Location
- Crooms Hill; Greenwich, Greater London, SE10 8HN; England; 51.475635°N 0.00577°W

Information
- Type: Voluntary aided school
- Religious affiliation: Roman Catholic
- Established: 1850
- Founders: Ursulines
- Local authority: Greenwich
- Department for Education URN: 100193 Tables
- Ofsted: Reports
- Head Teacher: Mark O'Shaughnessy
- Gender: Girls
- Age: 11 to 16
- Enrolment: 634 as of January 2023
- Website: www.stursulas.com

St Ursula's Convent School is a Roman Catholic secondary school for girls, located in the Greenwich area of the Royal Borough of Greenwich in London, England.

St Ursula's is a voluntary aided school, and is part of the Ursuline Order within the Roman Catholic Archdiocese of Southwark. The school is also part of the Greenwich Local Authority, and coordinates with Greenwich London Borough Council for admissions.

The school offers GCSEs and BTECs as programmes of study for pupils. St Ursula's has a specialism in Humanities and has additional resources for the specialism. The school is also designated as a Teaching School.

== Notable former pupils ==
- Margaret Moran (b. 1955) - Labour Party politician, Member of Parliament (MP) for Luton South (1997-2010)
- Adelaide Damoah (b. 1976) - painter and performance artist
