= 2005 Livingston by-election =

UK parliamentary by-election

- 29 September 2005
- Turnout: 38.6%
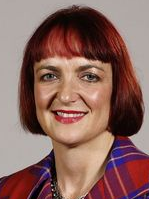

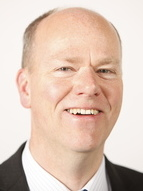
	First party	Second party
	Lab
Candidate	Jim Devine	Angela Constance
Party	Labour	SNP
Popular vote	12,319	9,639
Percentage	41.8%	32.7%
Swing	▼9.3%	▲11.1%
	Third party	Fourth party
	LD
Candidate	Charles Dundas	Gordon Lindhurst
Party	Liberal Democrats	Conservative
Popular vote	4,362	1,993
Percentage	14.8%	6.8%
Swing	▼0.6%	▼3.4%
MP before election
Robin Cook
Labour
Elected MP
Jim Devine
Labour

A by-election for the United Kingdom parliamentary constituency of Livingston was held on 29 September 2005, following the death of incumbent Labour Party Member of Parliament (MP) Robin Cook. It was won by Jim Devine, who held the seat for Labour.

Cook died on 6 August 2005. Notice of the vacancy in the constituency was published in The London Gazette on 2 September, which allowed the Speaker of the House of Commons to issue the writ for the election on 8 September under the Recess Elections Act 1975. The poll was held on 29 September, in the week of the Labour Party Conference, when the Labour candidate Jim Devine held the seat for his party.

A by-election for the Glasgow Cathcart seat in the Scottish Parliament was also held on the same day.

== Result ==
Livingston by-election, 2005
Party	Candidate	Votes	%	±%
Labour	Jim Devine	12,319	41.8	▼9.3
SNP	Angela Constance	9,639	32.7	▲11.1
Liberal Democrats	Charles Dundas	4,362	14.8	▼0.6
Conservative	Gordon Lindhurst	1,993	6.8	▼3.4
Green	David Robertson	529	1.8	New
Scottish Socialist	Steven Nimmo	407	1.4	▼0.4
UKIP	Peter Adams	108	0.4	New
Independent	Melville Brown	55	0.2	New
Alliance for Change (UK)	John William Allman	33	0.1	New
Socialist (GB)	Brian Gardner	32	0.1	New
Majority		2,680	9.1	▼20.4
Turnout		29,477	38.6	▼19.5
Labour hold		Swing	▼10.2	

== Previous result ==
General Election 2005: Livingston
Party	Candidate	Votes	%	±%
Labour	Robin Cook	22,657	51.1	▼1.9
SNP	Angela Constance	9,560	21.6	▼2.0
Liberal Democrats	Charles Dundas	6,832	15.4	▲5.5
Conservative	Alison Ross	4,499	10.1	▲2.5
Scottish Socialist	Steven Nimmo	789	1.8	▼1.2
Majority		13,097	29.5	▲0.1
Turnout		44,337	58.1	▲2.0
Labour hold		Swing	▼1.2	

== Reaction to result ==
Labour's retention of the seat, albeit with a reduced majority, was regarded by the party with satisfaction. The Scottish National Party was the only party to increase their vote from the general election, and although they did not win, they achieved a swing of 10% from Labour. The Liberal Democrats' share of the vote fell by 0.6%.

There was a swing from Labour to Conservatives of 3%, but given the fourth-place position of the Conservative Party in this seat, and their third-place position in Scotland, the significance of this is debatable.

In 2007 Angela Constance gained the Livingston seat in the Scottish Parliament (which has slightly different boundaries) from Labour.

== See also ==
- Livingston (UK Parliament constituency)
- Elections in Scotland
