= Jim Devine =

British politician (born 1953)

Member of Parliament for Livingston
- In office 29 September 2005 – 12 April 2010
- Preceded by: Robin Cook
- Succeeded by: Graeme Morrice

Personal details
- Born: James Devine; 21 May 1953 (age 72) Blackburn, West Lothian, Scotland
- Party: Labour
- Spouse: Liz (divorced)
- Children: 2

James Devine (born 21 May 1953) is a former Labour Party politician in Scotland. He was the Member of Parliament (MP) for Livingston from 2005 until 2010 and chairman of the Scottish Labour Party between 1994 and 1995.

On 16 June 2009, following the 2009 expenses scandal, he was barred by the Labour Party from seeking re-election at the 2010 general election, after reports he claimed expenses for work on his home from a non-existent firm. He was convicted of false accounting on 10 February 2011 and sentenced to 16 months' imprisonment on 31 March 2011.

== Early life ==
Devine was born and brought up in Blackburn, West Lothian and was educated in Bathgate. He served as the election agent for Livingston Constituency Labour Party and the local MP Robin Cook from the 1983 general election until Cook died in 2005. From 1994 to 1995 he was the chairman of the Scottish Labour Party.

Prior to his election, Devine worked as a full-time trade union official for the Confederation of Health Service Employees (COHSE) and then as Head of Health in the Scottish Region of the public sector union after UNISON was formed in 1993. Before becoming a trade union official Devine was a mental health nurse, having trained and worked at Bangour Village Hospital in Dechmont.

== Parliamentary career ==
He was selected to succeed Robin Cook as the Labour Party candidate in the ensuing 2005 Livingston by-election following Cook's sudden death. He won, defeating his SNP rival though Labour's majority was reduced by more than 10,000 votes. He made his maiden speech in the House of Commons on 25 October 2005.

He served as the parliamentary private secretary to the Health Minister Rosie Winterton until he resigned in protest at the decision to replace Trident. He was also a member of the Science and Technology as well as the Scottish Affairs Select Committees.

In October 2010, Devine's former office manager Marion Kinley won a complaint of unfair dismissal and breach of contract against him. An employment tribunal ruled that Devine had subjected Kinley to "a course of bullying and harassment". During the hearing, Devine was accused of perpetrating a hoax suggesting that newspapers were investigating the two of them. He was said to have used a friend, Fiona Fox, to pose as an investigative journalist. Compensation of £35,000 was ordered to be paid.

On Devine's failure to pay the compensation of £35,000, bankruptcy proceedings were instituted against him and he was adjudicated bankrupt on 23 February 2011.

== MPs' expenses ==
On 2 June 2009, Devine was referred to the Labour Party's 'star committee' with a status of 'urgent' in connection with allegations involving expense claims submitted for a company that never existed. He had gained the backing of his local party members a week prior to the hearing, but the panel unanimously recommended he should be deselected. He was thereafter barred from standing as a candidate for the Labour Party in the next UK general election.

=== Prosecution and conviction ===
On 5 February 2010 it was announced that Devine was to be prosecuted over his expense claims. The former Livingston MP initially faced two charges under section 17 of the Theft Act 1968 of false accounting. The first charge alleged that between July 2008 and April 2009 Devine dishonestly claimed £3,240 for cleaning services using false invoices. The second charge alleged that in March 2009 Devine dishonestly claimed £5,505 for stationery using false invoices. He denied the charges, though in a live Channel 4 interview when questioned: "So you got a receipt from somebody you were paying as a member of staff, and submitted it as stationery?" by journalist Krishnan Guru-Murthy, Devine replied: "Yes. This was allowed at the time."

On 27 May 2010 Devine, Elliot Morley, David Chaytor and Lord Hanningfield (Paul White) appeared at Southwark Crown Court for a preliminary hearing. They faced charges of false accounting under the Theft Act.

Devine's trial began on 2 February 2011. The indictment he faced ultimately included three counts of false accounting under the Theft Act 1968. On 10 February 2011 he was found guilty on two counts of false accounting (relating to false claims for a total of £8,385) but not guilty on another count (relating to £360). Sentencing was adjourned for four weeks. On 31 March 2011 Devine was sentenced to 16 months imprisonment. He was released from prison on 1 August 2011 after serving a quarter of his sentence. He was freed under the home detention curfew scheme, under which prisoners who are deemed to pose a low risk are tagged and released early after serving at least a quarter of their sentence. His release was met with anger from groups including the TaxPayers' Alliance.

As a result of his conviction and sentence, Devine was automatically expelled from the Labour Party.

== Personal life ==
Devine used to live in Blackburn, West Lothian. He is divorced from his wife Liz, and has a daughter and a son. In 2005, Devine admitted to a number of affairs and a conviction for drink driving. After his release from prison, Devine moved to Killarney, Ireland to start a new life.

== See also ==
Other Members of Parliament found guilty of fraud during the 2009 expenses scandal:

- David Chaytor – Labour MP for Bury North from 1997 to 2010
- Eric Illsley – Labour MP for Barnsley Central from 1987 to 2011
- Denis MacShane – Labour MP for Rotherham from 1994 to 2012
- Margaret Moran – Labour MP for Luton South from 1997 to 2010
- Elliot Morley – Labour MP for Glanford and Scunthorpe from 1987 to 1997 and then Scunthorpe from 1997 to 2010
