= Margaret Moran =

British politician (born 1955)

Chair of the East of England Regional Select Committee
- In office 26 March 2009 – 11 May 2010
- Preceded by: Position Established
- Succeeded by: Position Abolished

Assistant Government Whip
- In office 13 June 2003 – 11 May 2005
- Prime Minister: Tony Blair
- Preceded by: Gerry Sutcliffe
- Succeeded by: Claire Ward

Member of Parliament for Luton South
- In office 1 May 1997 – 12 April 2010
- Preceded by: Graham Bright
- Succeeded by: Gavin Shuker

Personal details
- Born: 24 April 1955 (age 71) Bethnal Green, London, England
- Party: Labour (until her suspension in 2010)
- Spouse: Michael Booker
- Education: University of Birmingham
- Occupation: Teacher
- Website: Official website (archived)

Margaret Mary Moran (born 24 April 1955) is a former Labour Party politician in the United Kingdom. Moran was the Member of Parliament (MP) for Luton South from the 1997 general election to 2010. In November 2012, jurors at Southwark Crown Court ruled that she had falsified her parliamentary expenses; she had been unable to stand trial because of mental health issues, but the case was nevertheless heard without her. Her fraudulent claims totalled more than £53,000, the highest amount by any politician in the United Kingdom parliamentary expenses scandal.

== Early life ==
Moran was born in Bethnal Green, to Irish parents Patrick and Mary (née Murphy). She went to St Ursula's High School (now St Ursula's Convent School), a Roman Catholic girls' school in Greenwich, and then to St Mary's College (now St Mary's University College), a Roman Catholic college in Strawberry Hill, Twickenham. She subsequently attended the University of Birmingham, gaining a Bachelor of Social Science degree in geography and sociology in 1978. She also attended Hackney College.

== Before Parliament ==
Moran initially worked as a teacher. In 1984, she became a local councillor in the London Borough of Lewisham; later she became leader of the council between 1993 and 1995. At the same time, Moran stood in the 1992 general election in Carshalton and Wallington, finishing in third place. Moran was also the director of "Housing for Women' a housing association, national president of the housing branch of the NALGO trade union, vice chair of the Association of London Authorities and vice chair and chair of the Association of Metropolitan Authorities.

== Parliamentary career ==
For the 1997 election, she was selected to stand for Labour in Luton South through an all-women shortlist. At the election she was elected, gaining the seat from the Conservatives.

Following her re-election in the 2001 election she was promoted to the position of assistant whip attached to HM Treasury between 2003 and 2005. While serving as a whip, Moran was obliged to vote along with the government line, and did so. She was re-elected for a third term in the 2005 election, with a reduced majority. There had been significant opposition among Luton's large Muslim population to her support for the 2003 invasion of Iraq. Moran supported plans to negotiate with Spain over the status of Gibraltar, describing Gibraltar as "effectively an outpost colony within a major European partner", although she accepted that any change must have the consent of Gibraltarians. From 2006, Moran was a member of the Home Affairs Committee, where she took an interest in helping female victims of domestic violence and in issues of child protection. She was for a time chairwoman of the All-Party Group on Domestic Violence and worked with Women's Aid to launch online projects such as WomenSpeak and KidSpeak.

Moran's interest in child protection led her to go to the Internet Governance Forum at Rio de Janeiro in November 2007 and she was involved in the launch of the UK Internet Governance Forum. on 6 March 2008. Moran became a member of the Hansard Society Commission on the Scrutiny of Parliament. She also worked with the Fawcett Society producing a publication on women's participation on the internet.

== Expense fraud ==
Moran's claims for expenses 2004–05 were £73,198, higher than those of Luton North MP Kelvin Hopkins. However, it was not until May 2009 that the full details of her claims were revealed. These caused Moran to announce she would not stand in the 2010 general election, and she was later barred from doing so by the National Executive Committee of the Labour Party. Speaking in Parliament, the then Prime Minister Gordon Brown described Moran's behaviour as "totally unacceptable".

=== Unsolicited mail and stationery costs ===
Moran had particularly high spending on stationery and postage and on staff costs.

In the run up to the 2005 general election, Moran sent out thousands of unsolicited letters to her constituents. Following a complaint to the Commons authorities about one of the letters, the Assistant Serjeant at Arms Mark Harvey said the letter was "a reasonable solicited response", but was against the spirit of the regulations. He went on to say, "Having discussed this with Ms Moran, I'm confident that there will be no repetition in future." The regulations have since changed and there is now a limit on the postage costs an MP can claim for.

=== Second home allowance ===
On 8 May 2009, The Daily Telegraph revealed Moran spent £22,500 of taxpayers' money treating dry rot at her and her partner's seaside house in Southampton, about 100 miles from her Luton South constituency, only days after switching her "second home" to his Southampton property. Moran's partner had worked in Southampton for 20 years when the claim was made. The parliamentary authorities were concerned that the work broke the "spirit" of the rules, but advised that it was permissible on three occasions. The Telegraph said the expenses "appear to be among the most questionable of any MP," and the BBC said the claims caused "widespread public anger". Moran had previously switched her second-home allowance from Luton to London and renovated both. When telephoned and questioned by Rosa Prince from the Daily Telegraph she said "How dare you" and ended the call.

On 10 May 2009, she defended her expenses claim in an interview with Andrew Sinclair on the BBC's Politics Show, saying she had kept to the rules. According to Moran, "You could argue that I use it to be able to sustain my work. Any MP has to have a proper family life, they have to have support of their partner."

On 12 May, just two days after defending using taxpayers' money on her third home, she agreed to repay it, albeit in instalments. In a statement she asserted: "I do understand constituents' anger at the current fees regime, which is why I will be repaying the full amount claimed for my home in Southampton." On the same day, The Daily Telegraph alleged that she used £1,104.34 from her incidental office expenses to pay for "furniture for her house". Despite the repayment, Moran has refused to apologise for her actions and still claims to have done nothing wrong.

Moran's local constituency party backed her following revelations over her claims, but asked her to explain her actions. The then chairman, Mahmood Hussain, described her conduct as "very questionable".

=== Other expense claims ===
On 14 May, The Daily Telegraph reported that Moran had billed the taxpayer almost £4,000 in respect of an employment tribunal case brought by a former member of her staff. The House of Commons fees office agreed that the bill could be paid out of her staffing budget.

=== Outcomes ===
On 18 May 2009, television presenter Esther Rantzen announced that she would stand against Moran in Luton South as an "anti-sleaze" candidate. Rantzen launched her campaign in July 2009, but lost her deposit in the 2010 general election. On 28 May 2009, Moran announced that she would not stand at the forthcoming general election, citing the "bruising effect upon my friends, my family and my health." Moran also said "The House of Commons fees office gave me incorrect advice upon which I acted. They have now apologised." Subsequently, she was barred from standing in the next general election by a disciplinary panel of the Labour Party.

In November 2009, Moran's local newspaper, Luton & Dunstable Express, launched a "Get Moran Out Now" campaign on its front page. It called for her to resign immediately rather than continuing to claim expenses and receiving a big payoff and large pension by remaining in her seat until the general election. The newspaper was critical of Moran's failure to apologise or explain her conduct to her constituents, saying that she had "behaved disgracefully" and had "fleeced taxpayers quite enough".

In December 2009, Gavin Shuker was selected as the Labour candidate to replace Moran and retained the seat in the general election. He has said that her various expense claims could not be defended. The Guardian named Moran as one of the newsmakers of the year as a result of her role in the expenses scandal.

After the expense revelations broke, Moran stopped attending Parliament claiming that the stress of the expenses scandal had worsened an existing medical condition. Liberal Democrat candidate Qurban Hussain suggested she had gone into hiding, "leaving her constituents completely unrepresented while continuing to draw her generous salary".

=== Prosecution ===
On 6 September 2011, the Crown Prosecution Service (CPS) announced that Moran would face 21 criminal charges: 15 of false accounting and six of forgery. She was summoned to appear at Westminster Magistrates' Court on 19 September 2011 where she was reported to have wept throughout the hearing. Moran was sent to Southwark Crown Court for trial on 30 October 2011; she failed to appear and a 'not guilty' plea was entered by default in her absence. A date for the trial of an issue was set for 18 April with a directions hearing set for 15 December. On 15 December 2011, Mr Justice Saunders was informed that psychiatrists considered Moran unfit to plead with the defence contending that the trial should therefore not proceed. In April 2012, after receiving evidence from a number of psychiatrists, the judge determined that Moran was not fit to plead in person—the proceedings were allowed to proceed in her absence. On 13 November 2012, the trial jury found she had committed the acts alleged. In December 2012, she was sentenced to a two-year supervision and treatment order, the judge commenting that although some might feel she had "got away with it", the court had acted "in accordance with the law of the land and on the basis of the evidence that it hears".

=== Attempt to remove expenses scandal from Wikipedia page ===
In 2010 it was reported by the Daily Telegraph that an IP address associated with the Parliamentary estate had been discovered attempting to remove information on Margaret Moran's role in the expenses scandal from her Wikipedia page. As the edits were made from a parliamentary computer, the user received a warning from Wikipedia.

== Dispatches lobbyist investigation ==
In March 2010, Moran was one of the MPs involved in offering influential political lobbying for financial reward in a sting operation set up by the Channel 4 Dispatches programme. The MPs were secretly filmed discussing how they could assist the interests of a business which had been invented by the programme-makers. In the film, Moran appears to claim to be able to help modify laws on immigration in order to boost the business interests of the fake company. She also claimed that she could call on a "girls' gang" of female ministers to help, and yet, while she appeared to be enthusiastically courting the fake company, half an hour after the meeting her office told a reporter that she was unavailable to do any work on behalf of her constituents because she was "not very well at the moment". Moran claimed that "This meeting was the beginning of an attempt to rebuild my life".

On 22 March, she was suspended from holding office in the Labour Party. Labour leader Gordon Brown indicated that there would not be an investigation into the conduct of Moran and the other Labour MPs filmed in the programme.

== Improper use of House of Commons stationery ==
In May 2009, the Financial Times alleged Moran mis-used stationery to support eQuality Networks Ltd (EQN) T/A eQuality Network, a non-profit group which claims to help impoverished communities. Moran is currently an associate (listed as Margaret Booker). Moran repeatedly used House of Commons headed paper to write letters in support of EQN, without disclosing her involvement with the company. The Financial Times obtained copies of letters written by Moran supporting eQuality Networks' funding bids and personal invitations to eQuality Networks events. Moran denied committing the offence and claimed her husband "has no part in the running of the organisation".

In 2007 a Spanish Court ruled that she had illegally blocked a right of way at her holiday home in Carataunas, Spain, by installing a gate and digging up the path with an excavator. She was ordered to make the area as it was. She used House of Commons headed paper during the dispute, including a note written in Spanish and English which said "Please note – this road is private & closed. Please remove your motorcycle from our land. Moran family."

== eQuality Networks ==
In 2007 the Guardian claimed Moran had been exploiting interns insisting they work for the company eQuality Networks rather than doing political work. Similar allegations were levelled at Moran in 2009 following an investigation by the Financial Times.

In 2009 it emerged that one of Moran's employees at eQuality Networks had successfully nominated her to the shortlist of MP of the Year at the Women in Public Life Awards, describing her as a "forward thinking, modern day suffragette".

== Personal life ==
In 2009 she married her long-time partner of 30 years, Michael Booker, who lives and works at the University of Southampton as a safety adviser. They have no children. Her personal interests include céilidhs, visiting historical sites and walking.

== See also ==
Other Members of Parliament found guilty of fraud during the 2009 expenses scandal:

- David Chaytor – Labour MP for Bury North from 1997 to 2010
- Jim Devine – Labour MP for Livingston from 2005 to 2010
- Eric Illsley – Labour MP for Barnsley Central from 1987 to 2011
- Denis MacShane – Labour MP for Rotherham from 1994 to 2012
- Elliot Morley – Labour MP for Glanford and Scunthorpe from 1987 to 1997 and for Scunthorpe from 1997 to 2010

== Publications ==
- Women Speach: E Democracy Or Title Democracy by Margaret Moran, 2002, The Fawcett Society ISBN 978-0-901890-22-1
- Women in Parliament: The New Suffragettes by Bonie Sones, Joni Lovenduski and Margaret Moran, 2005, Politico's Publishing Ltd ISBN 978-1-84275-140-4

Parliament of the United Kingdom
Preceded by Graham Bright	Member of Parliament for Luton South; 1997–2010	Succeeded by Gavin Shuker
