= David Chaytor =

British politician (born 1949)

Member of Parliament for Bury North
- In office 1 May 1997 – 12 April 2010
- Preceded by: Alistair Burt
- Succeeded by: David Nuttall

Personal details
- Born: David Michael Chaytor; 3 August 1949 (age 77) Bury, Lancashire, England
- Party: Labour
- Children: 3
- Education: University of London; Huddersfield Polytechnic; University of Bradford; University of Leeds
- Profession: Former teacher

David Michael Chaytor (born 3 August 1949) is a former British Labour Party politician, who was the member of parliament (MP) for Bury North from 1997 to 2010. He was the first member of Parliament to be sentenced following the United Kingdom parliamentary expenses scandal of 2009.

On 2 June 2009, he announced that he would not be standing for Parliament at the next general election. On 3 December 2010 he pleaded guilty to charges of false accounting in relation to Parliamentary expenses claims and he was sentenced to 18 months' imprisonment on 7 January 2011. Chaytor was released from prison on 26 May 2011 under the conditions of Home Detention Curfew.

== Education ==
David Chaytor was born in Bury and was educated at the East Ward Primary School and Bury Grammar School (an independent school), both in the town. He later attended the University of London where he was awarded a BA degree in 1970, Huddersfield Polytechnic, the University of Bradford, and he then qualified as a teacher in 1976 at the University of Leeds. He then returned to the University of London to finish his Masters (MPhil) degree in philosophy in 1979 and did further postgraduate work at the University of Bradford.

== Early career ==
He started work as a college lecturer in 1973, before being appointed as the senior staff tutor at the Manchester College of Arts and Technology in 1983. In 1990, he became the Head of Continuing Education at the same institute, where he remained until his election to parliament.

== Political career ==
=== Local council ===
He was elected as a councillor on the Calderdale Borough Council in 1982 and served until 1997. He served as chairman of the Labour Group, and chairman of the Education, Economic Development, and Highways & Transportation Committees.

=== Parliament ===
He contested the parliamentary constituency of Calder Valley at the 1987 General Election, but was defeated by 6,045 votes by the sitting Conservative MP Donald Thompson. He again contested Calder Valley at the 1992 General Election, at which he reduced Thompson's majority to 4,878. He had to cede the candidacy for Calder Valley because of an all women shortlist which selected Christine McCafferty. However, Chaytor contested the marginal seat of Bury North at the 1997 General Election which he won, defeating the then Social Security minister Alistair Burt by 7,866 votes. Chaytor made his maiden speech on 17 June 1997, where he talked of the humble Bury black pudding and Bury's most famous son, Robert Peel.

Chaytor's main political interests were in the Environment, Education, Transport and Foreign Affairs. In the 1997–2001 Parliament he was a Member of the Environmental Audit Select Committee and in January 2000 he received the Green Ribbon award as best environmentalist backbencher in the House of Commons.

He was a member of the Education & Skills Select Committee and the Environmental Audit Select Committee. He voted against the government on the privatisation of the National Air Traffic Services, and announced his intention to vote against the last clause of the Gambling Bill. Although he was educated under the Direct Grant system at Bury Grammar School, Chaytor became Chairman of Comprehensive Future, an organisation set up to end selection in British schools, standing down from the role in 2009. He chaired the All Party Group for Intelligent Energy, and co-chaired the All Party Group for Further Education and Lifelong Learning. He was the Secretary of Globe UK, the British branch of the international network of environmentalist parliamentarians.

=== Suspension and retirement from parliament ===
On 16 May 2009, following his self-referral to the Parliamentary Commissioner for Standards for claiming nearly £13,000 in mortgage expenses on a home on which the mortgage had already been paid, Chaytor was suspended by the Labour party, and on 2 June 2009 he announced that he would be stepping down as a member of parliament at the next general election. Shortly after this the Labour Party NEC's Special Endorsements Panel barred him from standing for election as a Labour Party candidate. The general election took place in June 2010, and Chaytor did not stand for election.

== Conviction and sentencing ==
On 5 February 2010, it was announced that he would be charged with offences under section 17 of the Theft Act 1968 relating to false accounting in relation to claims for Parliamentary expenses and on 27 May he and other politicians appeared at Southwark Crown Court for a preliminary hearing.

Following the failure of the attempt by the group to claim parliamentary privilege (dismissed either in the Court of Appeal or in United Kingdom Supreme Court), on 3 December 2010 he immediately pleaded guilty to three counts of false accounting involving approximately £18,000 and was released on bail until a sentencing hearing in January 2011. Among the charges was that he had claimed rent on a flat in Westminster which he in fact owned, using a fake tenancy agreement.

On 7 January 2011, Chaytor was sentenced by Mr Justice Saunders sitting in the Crown Court at Southwark to 18 months' imprisonment.

On 23 February 2011 it was announced that following legal advice, Chaytor was seeking leave to appeal against the length of his sentence. The application was heard by the Court of Appeal (Criminal Division) on 22 March 2011 and refused on 23 March 2011, when the Lord Chief Justice described the behaviour referred to in the charges as "calculating", with the element of dishonesty being "not simply inflated claims for expenses, but rather the careful preparation of bogus claims". The primary grounds of appeal (and the main mitigation in the original hearing) – that according to the UK Parliament's 'Green Book' expenses guidelines, Chaytor's situation would have entitled him to claim more than he had done but on a different property – was dismissed as not relevant.

On 26 May 2011, Chaytor was released from prison under the normal Home Detention Curfew licensing conditions.

== Personal life ==
David Chaytor is married with three children. As of 2014, he was living in France.

== See also ==
Other Members of Parliament found guilty of fraud during the 2008 expenses scandal:

- Jim Devine – Labour MP for Livingston from 2005 to 2010
- Eric Illsley – Labour MP for Barnsley Central from 1987 to 2011
- Denis MacShane – Labour MP for Rotherham from 1994 to 2012
- Margaret Moran – Labour MP for Luton South from 1997 to 2010
- Elliot Morley – Labour MP for Glanford and Scunthorpe from 1987 to 1997 and then Scunthorpe from 1997 to 2010

Parliament of the United Kingdom
Preceded by Alistair Burt	Member of Parliament for Bury North; 1997–2010	Succeeded by David Nuttall
