= List of MPs who lost their seat in the 2010 United Kingdom general election =

This is a list of MPs who lost their seat at the 2010 United Kingdom general election. In total, 76 MPs lost their seats.

== Members of Parliament who lost their seats ==
Party	Name	Constituency	Last office held whilst in power	Year elected	Defeated by	Party
Labour Party	Judy Mallaber	Amber Valley		1997	Nigel Mills	Conservative Party
Labour Party	Angela Smith	Basildon, contesting South Basildon and East Thurrock	Minister of State for Third Sector (2009–2010)	1997	Stephen Metcalfe	Conservative Party
Labour Party	Martin Linton	Battersea		1997	Jane Ellison	Conservative Party
Labour Party	Patrick Hall	Bedford		1997	Richard Fuller	Conservative Party
Labour Party	Terry Rooney	Bradford North, contesting Bradford East		1990	David Ward	Liberal Democrats
Labour Party	Ann Keen	Brentford and Isleworth	Parliamentary Under-Secretary of State for Health Services (2007–2010)	1997	Mary Macleod	Conservative Party
Labour Party	Dawn Butler	Brent South, contesting Brent Central	Minister for Young Citizens and Youth Engagement (2009–2010)	2005	Sarah Teather MP	Liberal Democrats
Labour Party	Ian Cawsey	Brigg and Goole		1997	Andrew Percy	Conservative Party
Labour Party	Nick Palmer	Broxtowe		1997	Anna Soubry	Conservative Party
Labour Party	Julie Morgan	Cardiff North		1997	Jonathan Evans	Conservative Party
Labour Party	Nick Ainger	Carmarthen West and South Pembrokeshire	Parliamentary Under-Secretary of State for the Wales Office (2005–2007)	1992	Simon Hart	Conservative Party
Labour Party	Jonathan Shaw	Chatham and Aylesford	Parliamentary Under-Secretary of State for the Department for Work and Pensions and Minister for Disabled People (2007–2010)	1997	Tracey Crouch	Conservative Party
Labour Party	Christine Russell	City of Chester		1997	Stephen Mosley	Conservative Party
Labour Party	Shona McIsaac	Cleethorpes		1997	Martin Vickers	Conservative Party
Labour Party	Phil Hope	Corby	Minister of State for Health (2008–2010)	1997	Louise Mensch	Conservative Party
Labour Party	Shahid Malik	Dewsbury	Parliamentary Under-Secretary of State for the Department for Communities and Local Government (2009–2010)	2005	Simon Reevell	Conservative Party
Labour Party	Gwyn Prosser	Dover		1997	Charlie Elphicke	Conservative Party
Labour Party	Joan Ryan	Enfield North	Parliamentary Under Secretary of State for Nationality, Citizenship and Immigration (2006–2007)	1997	Nick de Bois	Conservative Party
Labour Party	Paul Clark	Gillingham, contesting Gillingham and Rainham	Parliamentary Under-Secretary of State for the Department for Transport (2008–2010)	1997	Rehman Chishti	Conservative Party
Labour Party	Parmjit Dhanda	Gloucester	Parliamentary Under-Secretary of State, Department of Communities and Local Government (2006–2007)	2001	Richard Graham	Conservative Party
Labour Party	Tony Wright	Great Yarmouth		1997	Brandon Lewis	Conservative Party
Labour Party	Bill Rammell	Harlow	Minister of State for the Armed Forces (2009–2010)	1997	Robert Halfon	Conservative Party
Labour Party	Tony McNulty	Harrow East	Minister of State for Employment and Welfare Reform (2008–2009)	1997	Bob Blackman	Conservative Party
Labour Party	Michael (Jabez) Foster	Hastings and Rye	Parliamentary Under-Secretary of State for the Home Office (2009–2010)	1997	Amber Rudd	Conservative Party
Labour Party	Andrew Dismore	Hendon		1997	Matthew Offord	Conservative Party
Labour Party	Celia Barlow	Hove	Parliamentary Under-Secretary of State for the Department for Business, Enterprise and Regulatory Reform (2008–2010)	2005	Mike Weatherley	Conservative Party
Labour Party	Chris Mole	Ipswich	Parliamentary Under-Secretary of State for the Department for Transport (2009–2010)	2001	Ben Gummer	Conservative Party
Labour Party	Gillian Merron	Lincoln	Minister of State for Public Health (2009–2010)	1997	Karl McCartney	Conservative Party
Labour Party	Andy Reed	Loughborough		1997	Nicky Morgan	Conservative Party
Labour Party	Roger Berry	Kingswood		1992	Chris Skidmore	Conservative Party
Labour Party	Phyllis Starkey	Milton Keynes South West, contesting Milton Keynes South	Chair of the Communities and Local Government Select Committee (2005–2010)	1997	Iain Stewart	Conservative Party
Labour Party	Geraldine Smith	Morecambe and Lunesdale		1997	David Morris	Conservative Party
Labour Party	Sally Keeble	Northampton North	Parliamentary Under Secretary of State for the Department for International Development (2003–2005)	1997	Michael Ellis	Conservative Party
Labour Party	Mike O'Brien	North Warwickshire	Minister of State for Health Services (2009–2010)	1992	Dan Byles	Conservative Party
Labour Party	Charles Clarke	Norwich South	Home Secretary (2004–06)	1997	Simon Wright	Liberal Democrats
Labour Party	Gordon Prentice	Pendle		1992	Andrew Stephenson	Conservative Party
Labour Party	Linda Gilroy	Plymouth Sutton, contesting Plymouth Sutton and Devonport		1997	Oliver Colvile	Conservative Party
Labour Party	Sarah McCarthy-Fry	Portsmouth North	Exchequer Secretary to the Treasury (2009–2010)	2005	Penny Mordaunt	Conservative Party
Labour Party	Vera Baird	Redcar	Solicitor General for England and Wales (2007–2010)	2001	Ian Swales	Liberal Democrats
Labour Party	Jacqui Smith	Redditch	Home Secretary (2007–09)	1997	Karen Lumley	Conservative Party
Labour Party	Janet Anderson	Rossendale and Darwen	Vice-Chamberlain of the Household (1997–1998)	1992	Jake Berry	Conservative Party
Labour Party	Jim Knight	South Dorset	Minister of State for Employment and Welfare Reform (2009–2010)	2001	Richard Drax	Conservative Party
Labour Party	David Borrow	South Ribble		1997	Lorraine Fullbrook	Conservative Party
Labour Party	Stephen Ladyman	South Thanet		1997	Laura Sandys	Conservative Party
Labour Party	David Kidney	Stafford	Parliamentary Under Secretary of State for the Department for Energy and Climate Change (2009–2010)	1997	Jeremy Lefroy	Conservative Party
Labour Party	Charlotte Atkins	Staffordshire Moorlands	Parliamentary Under-Secretary of State for the Department for Transport (2004–2005)	1997	Karen Bradley	Conservative Party
Labour Party	Dari Taylor	Stockton South		1997	James Wharton	Conservative Party'
Labour Party	Lynda Waltho	Stourbridge		2005	Margot James	Conservative Party
Labour Party	David Drew	Stroud		1997	Neil Carmichael	Conservative Party
Labour Party	Anne Snelgrove	Swindon South		2005	Robert Buckland	Conservative Party
Labour Party	Brian Jenkins	Tamworth		1996	Chris Pincher	Conservative Party
Labour Party	Dan Norris	Wansdyke, contesting North East Somerset	Parliamentary Under Secretary of State for the Department for the Environment, Food and Rural Affairs (2009–2010)	1997	Jacob Rees-Mogg	Conservative Party
Labour Party	James Plaskitt	Warwick and Leamington	Parliamentary Under-Secretary of State for the Department for Work and Pensions (2005–2008)	1997	Chris White	Conservative Party
Labour Party	Claire Ward	Watford	Parliamentary Under Secretary of State for Justice (2009–2010)	1997	Richard Harrington	Conservative Party
Labour Party	Bob Blizzard	Waveney	Lord Commissioner of HM Treasury (2008–2010)	1997	Peter Aldous	Conservative Party
Labour Party	Rob Marris	Wolverhampton South West		2001	Paul Uppal	Conservative Party
Labour Party	Michael Foster	Worcester	Parliamentary Under-Secretary of State for the Department for International Development (2008–2010)	1997	Robin Walker	Conservative Party
Liberal Democrats	Paul Holmes	Chesterfield	Justice Spokesman and Chairman of the Liberal Democrats (2005–2010)	2001	Toby Perkins	Labour Party
Liberal Democrats	Willie Rennie	Dunfermline and West Fife	Chair of the Lib Dem Campaigns Team (2008–2010)	2006	Thomas Docherty	Labour Party
Liberal Democrats	Julia Goldsworthy	Falmouth and Camborne, contesting Camborne and Redruth	Communities and Local Government Spokesman (2007–2010)	2005	George Eustice	Conservative Party
Liberal Democrats	Lembit Öpik	Montgomeryshire	Housing Spokesman (2008–2010)	1997	Glyn Davies	Conservative Party
Liberal Democrats	Evan Harris	Oxford West and Abingdon	Science Spokesman (2008–2010)	1997	Nicola Blackwood	Conservative Party
Liberal Democrats	Susan Kramer	Richmond Park	Transport Spokesman (2008–2010)	2005	Zac Goldsmith	Conservative Party
Liberal Democrats	Paul Rowen	Rochdale	Work and Pensions Spokesman (2008–2010)	2005	Simon Danczuk	Labour Party
Liberal Democrats	Sandra Gidley	Romsey, contesting Romsey and Southampton North	Health Spokesman (2006–2010)	2000	Caroline Nokes	Conservative Party
Liberal Democrats	Richard Younger-Ross	Teignbridge, contesting Newton Abbot	Heritage Spokesman (2008–2010)	2001	Anne Marie Morris	Conservative Party
Conservative	Nigel Waterson	Eastbourne		1992	Stephen Lloyd	Liberal Democrats
Conservative	David Heathcoat-Amory	Wells		1983	Tessa Munt	Liberal Democrats
Democratic Unionist Party	Peter Robinson	Belfast East	Leader of the DUP and First Minister of Northern Ireland (2008–2016)	1979	Naomi Long	Alliance Party of Northern Ireland
Respect	George Galloway	Bethnal Green & Bow, contesting Poplar and Limehouse		2005	Jim Fitzpatrick	Labour Party
Scottish National Party	John Mason	Glasgow East		2008	Margaret Curran	Labour Party
Independent	Bob Spink	Castle Point		2001	Rebecca Harris	Conservative Party
Independent	Andrew Pelling	Croydon Central		2005	Gavin Barwell	Conservative Party
Independent	Frank Cook	Stockton North		1983	Alex Cunningham	Labour Party
Independent	Richard Taylor	Wyre Forest		2001	Mark Garnier	Conservative Party
Blaenau Gwent People's Voice	Dai Davies	Blaenau Gwent		2006	Nick Smith	Labour Party
