= Home Detention Curfew =

Detention scheme in the United Kingdom

Home Detention Curfew (HDC) is a detention scheme in the United Kingdom whereby fixed-term offenders serving between three months and four years in prison may be released between 15 days and 180 days (depending on sentence length) earlier than their 'normal' release date at the half-way point of the sentence to allow them to integrate back into society.

HDC is not available to those serving sentences for particular offences such as serious sex offences or violent crime, or to those 'liable to removal' from the UK. Prisoners are assessed for risk prior to being released under this scheme. Typically prisoners under HDC are required to remain in their designated home between 7 p.m. and 7 a.m., and fitted with an electronic monitoring tag to verify that they do not violate the terms of this curfew.
