= John Lewis List =

The John Lewis List was the name given to the list of expenses that Members of Parliament (MPs) in the United Kingdom could claim before 2010, after which the Independent Parliamentary Standards Authority (IPSA) was set up to administer MPs' business expenses. The list was so called because it was based on the prices of items from the John Lewis store — because it was highly rated by Which? magazine.

The John Lewis list was used by House of Commons officials to determine whether an expense claim item submitted by an MP was within reasonable cost. MPs who represented a constituency outside central London could each claim up to £23,000 a year towards the cost of running their second homes.

'The John Lewis List' has earned its place in history as a moniker for the expenses scandal, which was revealed in 2009 after a Freedom of Information request brought to light the extent of the abuse of the guidelines by a number of MPs. Despite being refused various claims by the now-defunct Fees Office staff, some MPs circumnavigated the process and were permitted by senior officials to bypass the checks put in place, leading to the reputational downfall and distrust of MPs.

== List in full ==
- Air conditioning unit £299.99
- Bed £1,000.00
- Bedside cabinet £100.00
- Bookcase/shelf £200.00
- Bookcase/cabinet £500.00
- Carpet £35.00 per square metre
- Carpet fitting £6.50 per square metre
- Coffee maker/machine £100.00
- Coffee table £250.00
- Dining armchairs (each) £150.00
- Dining chairs (each) £90.00
- Dining table £600.00
- Dishwasher £375.00
- Drawer chest (five) £500.00
- Dressing table £500.00
- Dry cleaning both personal and household [items] are allowable within reasonable limits
- Food mixer £200.00
- Freestanding mirror £300.00
- Fridge/freezer combi £550.00
- Gas cooker £650.00
- Hi-fi/stereo £750.00
- Installation of new bathroom £6,335.00
- Installation of new kitchen £10,000.00
- Lamp table £200.00
- Nest of tables £200.00
- Recordable DVD £270.00
- Rugs (each) £300.00
- Shredder £50.00
- Sideboard £795.00
- Suite of furniture £2,000.00
- Television set £750.00
- Tumble dryer £250.00
- Underlay (basic) £6.99 per square metre
- Wardrobe £700.00
- Washer dryer £500.00
- Washing machine £350.00
- Wooden flooring/carpets £35.00 per square metre
- Workstation £150.00

== See also ==
- United Kingdom Parliamentary expenses scandal
