= Elliot Morley =

British politician

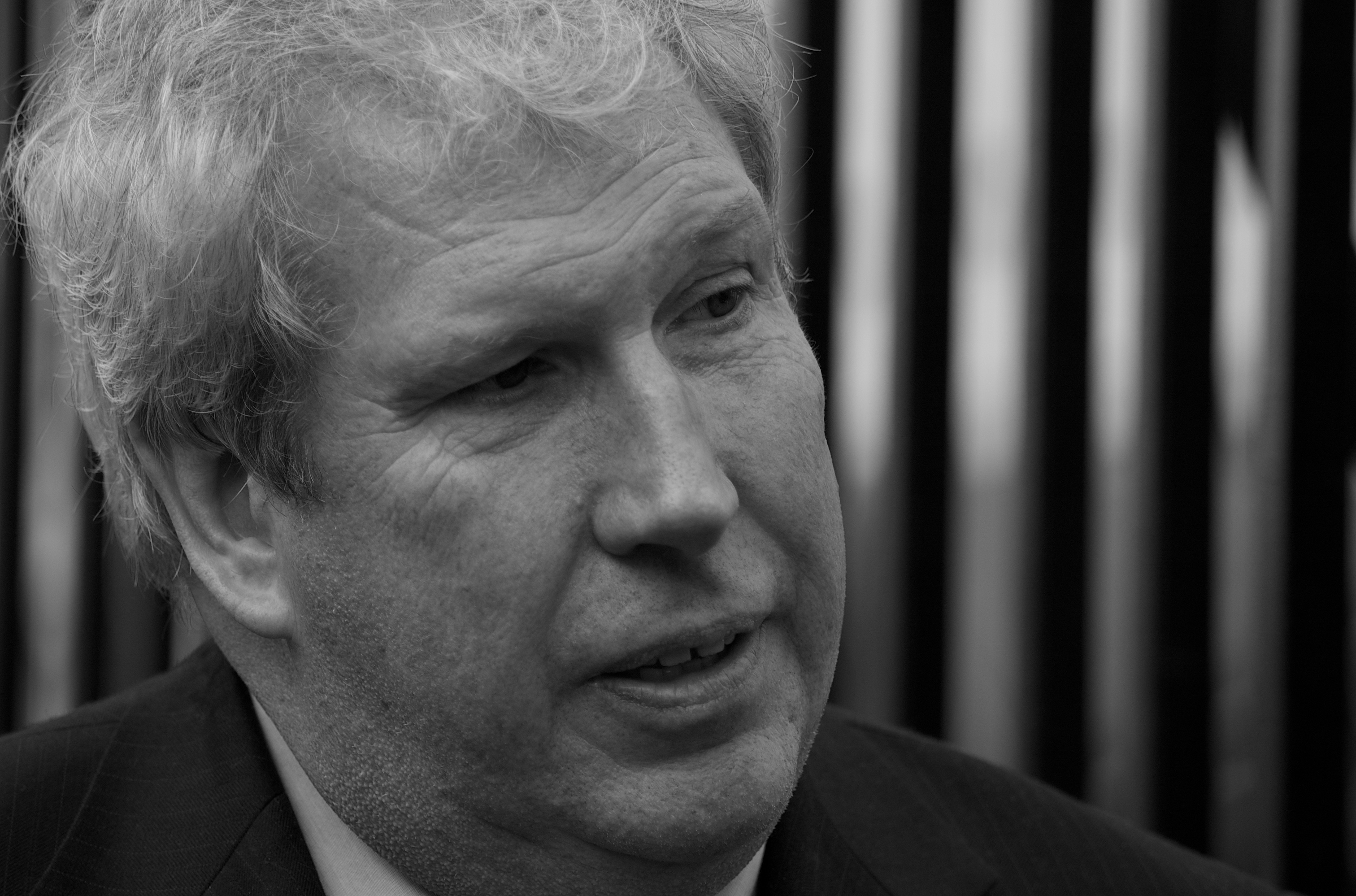
- Morley in 2008

Minister of State for Climate Change and the Environment (Note: Environment and Agri-Environment (2003–05))
- In office 13 June 2003 – 8 May 2006
- Prime Minister: Tony Blair
- Preceded by: Michael Meacher
- Succeeded by: Ian Pearson

Parliamentary Under-Secretary of State for Fisheries and the Countryside
- In office 5 May 1997 – 13 June 2003
- Prime Minister: Tony Blair
- Preceded by: James Clappison
- Succeeded by: Ben Bradshaw

Member of Parliament for Scunthorpe Glanford and Scunthorpe (1987–1997)
- In office 11 June 1987 – 12 April 2010
- Preceded by: Richard Hickmet
- Succeeded by: Nic Dakin

Personal details
- Born: Elliot Anthony Morley; 6 July 1952 (age 74) Liverpool, England
- Party: Labour
- Spouse: Patricia Hunt
- Children: 1 son, 1 daughter
- Education: Hull College of Education
- Profession: Teacher
- Website: elliotmorley.co.uk

Elliot Anthony Morley (born 6 July 1952) is a British former Labour Party politician, who was the Member of Parliament (MP) for Glanford and Scunthorpe from 1987 to 1997 and then Scunthorpe from 1997 to 2010. In 2009, he was accused by The Daily Telegraph of continuing to claim parliamentary expenses for a mortgage that had already been repaid. Morley was prosecuted and on 7 April 2011 pleaded guilty in Southwark Crown Court to two counts of false accounting, involving over £30,000. On 20 May 2011, he was sentenced to 16 months' imprisonment. He was released from prison on 20 September 2011 having served a quarter of his sentence.

== Early life ==
He attended St Margaret's C of E High School on Aigburth Road in Aigburth in south Liverpool and received a BEd from Hull College of Education. He was head of Special Needs at Greatfield High School in Hull.

== Political career ==
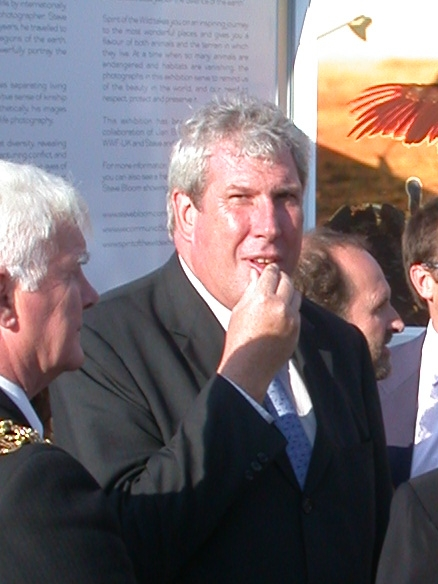
Morley in Birmingham in September 2005, in his role as Minister

Before entering Parliament, Morley was a Labour member of Hull City Council representing Drypool Ward from 1979 to 1986. He stood unsuccessfully for Beverley in 1983.

He served as Fisheries Minister from 1997 to 2003, and then as Environment Minister in the Department for Environment, Food and Rural Affairs, but left government in the May 2006 reshuffle. During his time in government, Morley pushed for a series of environmental causes. In 2004, he sought to strengthen the United Kingdom's efforts to purchase legally harvested lumber and aided the launch of a programme to manage flooding and coastal erosion called 'WaveNet'. In 2005 Morley assisted in the establishment of a Governmental Decontamination Service, to provide decontamination and cleansing assistance after chemical, radiological, biological, or nuclear incidents and major accidental releases of harmful materials.

On 19 December 2006 he was appointed to the Privy Council. This was revoked on 8 June 2011. He was Chairman of the Energy and Climate Change Select Committee, leaving this post when his expenses claims came under investigation. In 2007 Morley voted to support the Freedom of Information (Amendment) Bill, which would have given Parliament a blanket exemption from the Freedom of Information Act and thereby prevent the release of any information on expenses claims by Members of Parliament. However the Bill was defeated.

=== Expenses claims ===
As part of its disclosure of expenses of British Members of Parliament, The Daily Telegraph alleged on 14 May 2009 that Morley claimed £800 a month in respect of a property in Winterton, near Scunthorpe, for 18 months after the mortgage ended, and received an overpayment of £16,800 in total.

The Telegraph also alleged Morley let a London flat designated as his main residence to another Labour MP, Ian Cawsey, a close friend and former special adviser. Cawsey named the property as his second home, allowing him to claim £1,000 a month to cover the rent which he was charged by Morley. In November 2007, the newspaper claims Morley 'flipped' his designated second home from his Scunthorpe property to his London flat, and for four months the two men claimed expenses on the same property.

Morley told BBC News that he had repaid the money two weeks before The Telegraph story breaking upon realising he had mistakenly continued claiming for his mortgage payments after the mortgage had been paid off in 2006. On 14 May 2009 he was suspended from holding office in the Parliamentary Labour Party because of this scandal. Morley referred himself to John Lyon, Parliamentary Commissioner for Standards, in an effort to clear his name. It was reported that this inquiry was put on hold pending a police investigation. On 29 May 2009 he announced that he would not stand for re-election, but refused to resign immediately.

=== Prosecution ===
On 5 February 2010, it was reported that Morley would face criminal charges over his expenses, and the Labour whip was subsequently suspended. On 27 May 2010, Morley, David Chaytor, Jim Devine, and Lord Hanningfield (Paul White) appeared at Southwark Crown Court for a preliminary hearing. They faced charges of false accounting under the Theft Act.

Morley eventually pleaded guilty in the Crown Court at Southwark on 7 April 2011 before Mr Justice Saunders, who had presided over the other prosecutions in the Parliamentary expenses scandal. On 20 May 2011, Morley was sentenced to 16 months imprisonment on two counts of false accounting. He served four months in prison – a quarter of the sentence – and was released under the home detention curfew scheme. On 8 June 2011, he was expelled from the Privy Council, the first expulsion since Edgar Speyer in 1921.

Morley was previously an Honorary Fellow of the Institution of Civil Engineers for services to flood and coastal defence. He was expelled from the Institution of Civil Engineers on 4 July 2011, when the Institution's Professional Conduct Panel ruled that due to his breaching of "Rule 1 of the Rules of Professional Conduct, which require all members to uphold the dignity, standing and reputation of the Institution" by "committing offences of False Accounting in connection with his responsibilities as a Member of Parliament" he should be expelled from the Institution.

== Personal life ==
Morley married Patricia Hunt in 1975 in Hull. They have two children: a daughter (born 1980) and a son (born August 1984). He is Honorary Vice President of the Association of Drainage Authorities and Wildlife and Countryside Link. He has an Honorary Fellowship from the University of Lincoln for services to nature conservation.

He is a former President of Hull Teachers Association.

== See also ==
Other Members of Parliament found guilty of fraud during the 2008 expenses scandal:

- David Chaytor – Labour MP for Bury North from 1997 to 2010
- Jim Devine – Labour MP for Livingston from 2005 to 2010
- Eric Illsley – Labour MP for Barnsley Central from 1987 to 2011
- Denis MacShane – Labour MP for Rotherham from 1994 to 2012
- Margaret Moran – Labour MP for Luton South from 1997 to 2010

== Notes ==
Parliament of the United Kingdom
Preceded by Richard Hickmet	Member of Parliament for Glanford and Scunthorpe; 1987 – 1997	Constituency abolished
New constituency	Member of Parliament for Scunthorpe; 1997 – 2010	Succeeded by Nic Dakin
