= False accounting =

Legal term for a type of fraud

False accounting is a legal term for a type of fraud, considered a statutory offence in England and Wales, Northern Ireland and the Republic of Ireland.

== England and Wales ==
This offence is created by section 17 of the Theft Act 1968 which provides:

(1) Where a person dishonestly, with a view to gain for himself or another or with intent to cause loss to another,—

(a) destroys, defaces, conceals or falsifies any account or any record or document made or required for any accounting purpose; or
(b) in furnishing information for any purpose produces or makes use of any account, or any such record or document as aforesaid, which to his knowledge is or may be misleading, false or deceptive in a material particular;

he shall, on conviction on indictment, be liable to imprisonment for a term not exceeding seven years.

(2) For purposes of this section a person who makes or concurs in making in an account or other document an entry which is or may be misleading, false or deceptive in a material particular, or who omits or concurs in omitting a material particular from an account or other document, is to be treated as falsifying the account or document.

Section 17 replaces sections 82 and 83 of the Larceny Act 1861 and the Falsification of Accounts Act 1875. The words "dishonestly with a view to gain for himself or another or with intent to cause loss to another" are substituted in section 17 for the words "intent to defraud" in the former provisions.

"Dishonestly"

See Dishonesty.

"Gain" and "loss"

"Gain" and "loss" are defined by section 34(2)(a) of the Theft Act 1968.

Mode of trial and sentence

This offence is triable either way. A person guilty of this offence is liable, on conviction on indictment, to imprisonment for a term not exceeding seven years, or on summary conviction to imprisonment for a term not exceeding six months, or to a fine not exceeding the prescribed sum, or to both.

Visiting forces

This offence is an offence against property for the purposes of section 3 of the Visiting Forces Act 1952.

Jurisdiction

This offence is a Group A offence for the purposes of Part I of the Criminal Justice Act 1993.

== Northern Ireland ==
This offence is created by section 17 of the Theft Act (Northern Ireland) 1969.

Visiting forces

This offence is an offence against property for the purposes of section 3 of the Visiting Forces Act 1952.

Mode of trial

This offence is an indictable offence which may be tried summarily upon consent of the accused. See hybrid offence.

Sentence

A person guilty of this offence is liable, on conviction on indictment, to imprisonment for a term not exceeding seven years, or on summary conviction to imprisonment for a term not exceeding twelve months, or to a fine not exceeding the prescribed sum, or to both.

== Republic of Ireland ==
This offence is created by section 10 of the Criminal Justice (Theft and Fraud Offences) Act 2001.

This offence is a "relevant offence" for the purposes of the Criminal Justice Act 2011.

== See also ==
- Fraud
