= Southwark Crown Court =

Judicial building in South London, England

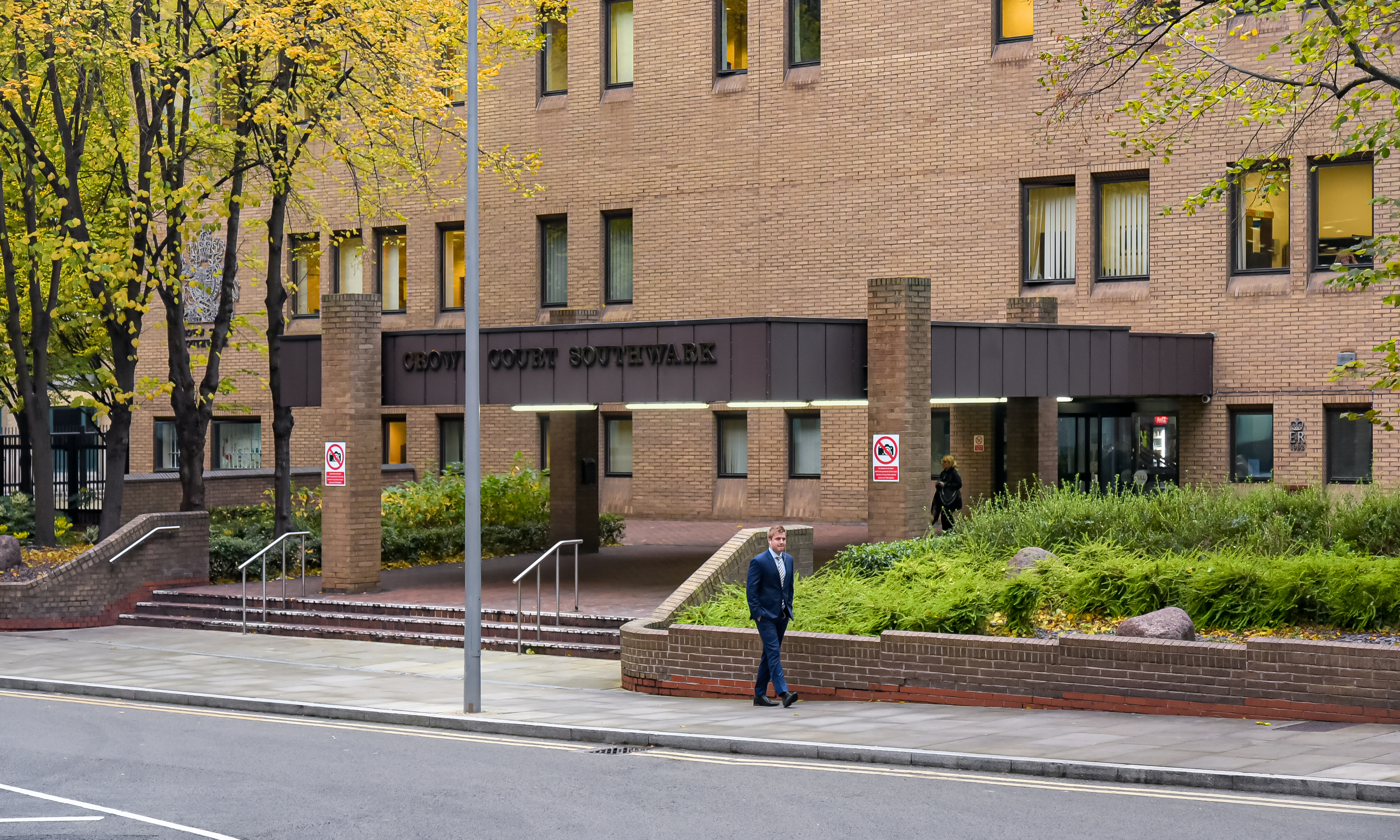
- Southwark Crown Court

- Shown in London
- 51.5056°N 0.0823°W
- Location: English Grounds, London

History
- Built: 1983

Site notes
- Architect: Property Services Agency
- Architectural style: Modern style

The Crown Court at Southwark, usually referred to as Southwark Crown Court, is a Crown Court venue at 1 English Grounds (off Battlebridge Lane) on the south bank of the River Thames between London Bridge and Tower Bridge in London. It operates within the South Eastern Region of His Majesty's Courts and Tribunals Service.

== History ==
Until the 1980s, the principal criminal court for south London was the Sessions House in Newington Causeway. However, as the number of criminal cases in south London grew, it became necessary to commission additional courthouse capacity for south London. The site selected, on the south bank of the River Thames, had been occupied by a large warehouse known as "Willson's Wharf", which was badly damaged in a fire in August 1971. The warehouse was demolished and the empty site was acquired by the Lord Chancellor's Department at a cost of £2 million.

The new building was designed by the Property Services Agency in the modern style, built in yellow brick at a cost of £12.6 million, and was opened in 1983. The design involved a broadly symmetrical three-storey main frontage facing south onto English Grounds. It featured a long flat portico which was projected forward and supported by brick columns; it was fenestrated by small square casement windows on the ground floor and by rectangular casement windows on the first and second floors, and there was an additional, taller block behind the main frontage. A Royal coat of arms was mounted on the left hand side of the main frontage at first floor level. Internally, the building was laid out to accommodate 15 courtrooms, making it the fourth largest court centre in the country and the main serious fraud centre for the area.

=== Notable cases ===
Notable cases have included the trial and conviction of the publicist, Max Clifford, in April 2014, for indecent assault, the trial and conviction of the entertainer, Rolf Harris, in June 2014, for indecent assault, the trial and conviction of the disc jockey, Dave Lee Travis, in September 2014, for indecent assault, the trial and conviction of the tennis player, Boris Becker, in April 2022, for breaches of the Insolvency Act, the trial and conviction of the MP Imran Ahmad Khan in April 2022, for sexually assaulting a 15-year-old boy, the trial and conviction of former chief executive of the Formula One Group, Bernie Ecclestone, for fraud in October 2023, and the trial and conviction of Russell Brand for rape in November 2026.

== See also ==
- Blackfriars Crown Court
- Inner London Crown Court
