= Rotherham by-election =

Rotherham by-election may refer to:

- 1892 Rotherham by-election
- 1899 Rotherham by-election
- 1910 Rotherham by-election
- 1916 Rotherham by-election
- 1917 Rotherham by-election
- 1933 Rotherham by-election
- 1976 Rotherham by-election
- 1994 Rotherham by-election
- 2012 Rotherham by-election
