= 1976 Rotherham by-election =

UK parliamentary by-election

- 24 June 1976
Candidate	Stanley Crowther	Douglas Hinckley
Party	Labour	Conservative
Popular vote	14,351	9,824
Swing	▼13.89	▲12.64
Candidate	Beth Graham	George Wright
Party	Liberal	National Front
Popular vote	2,214	1,696
Swing	▼5.53	N/A
MP before election
Brian O'Malley
Labour
Elected MP
Stanley Crowther
Labour

A by-election was held on 24 June 1976 for the UK parliamentary constituency of Rotherham following the death of Labour Member of Parliament (MP) Brian O'Malley. Labour held on to the seat in the by-election.

== Result ==
1976 Rotherham by-election
Party	Candidate	Votes	%	±%
Labour	Stanley Crowther	14,351	50.69	−13.89
Conservative	Douglas Hinckley	9,824	34.70	+12.64
Liberal	Beth Graham	2,214	7.82	−5.53
National Front	George Wright	1,696	5.99	New
World Grid Sunshine Room Party	Peter Bishop	129	0.46	New
English National	Robin Atkinson	99	0.35	New
Majority		4,527	15.99	−26.51
Turnout		28,313		
Labour hold		Swing		

== Aftermath ==
The result was significant as it meant that the Labour government retained a majority of one in the House of Commons. However although Labour had held the seat, The Glasgow Herald noted that the voters had sent the party a "sour message". In a seat that had been considered safe for Labour, their majority dropped by over 11,000 votes and there was a 13.3% swing to the Conservatives. Moreover, the reduced turnout was taken by the newspaper as suggesting some Labour supporters had failed to come out and vote for their party. The newspaper thought that the Prime Minister James Callaghan, would be "very concerned" by this fall in support and by the size of the National Front candidate's vote.

== See also ==
- 1899 Rotherham by-election
- 1910 Rotherham by-election
- 1917 Rotherham by-election
- 1994 Rotherham by-election
- 2012 Rotherham by-election
