= 1916 Rotherham by-election =

UK parliamentary by-election

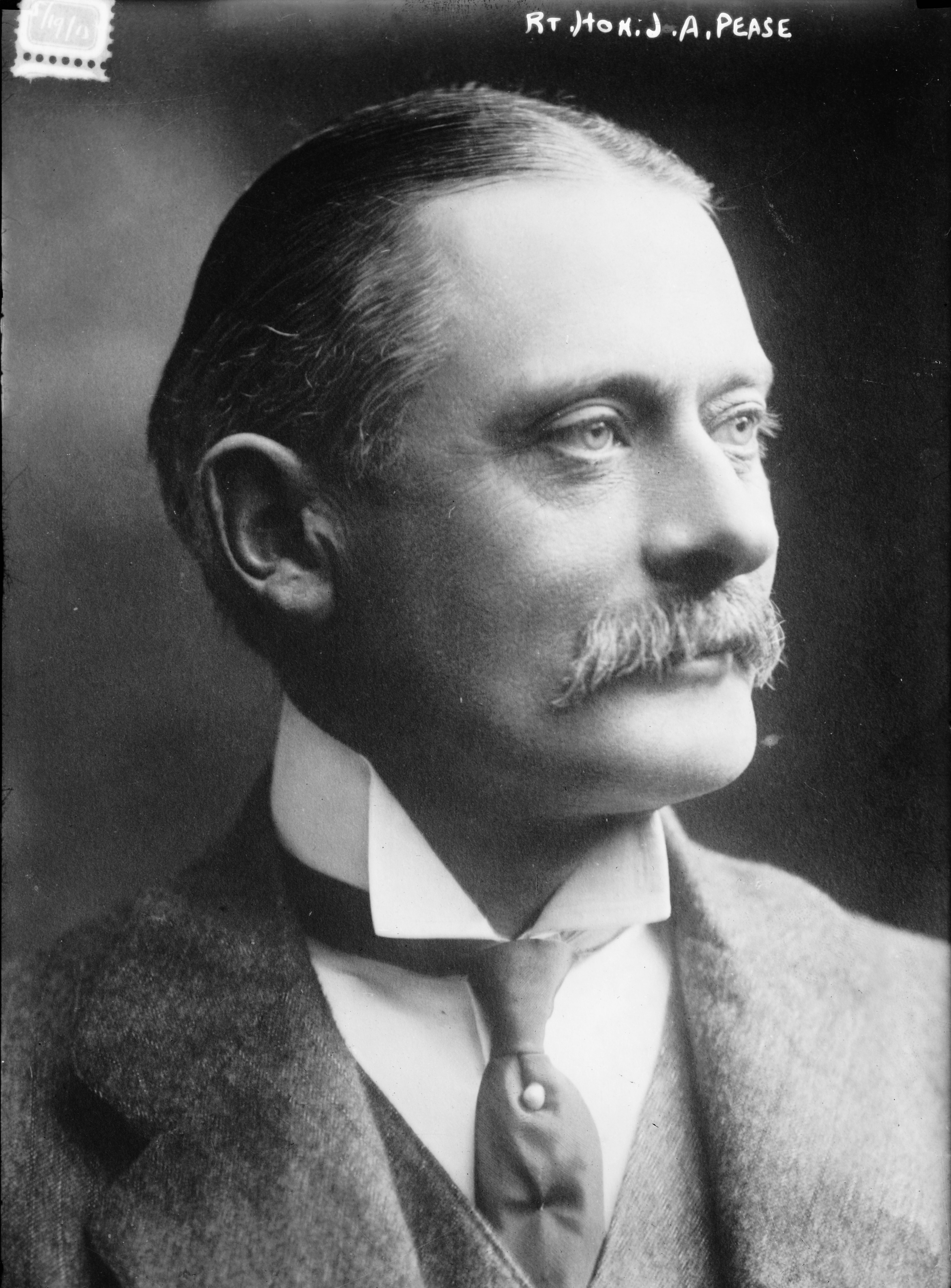
Jack Pease

The 1916 Rotherham by-election was a Parliamentary by-election held on 26 January 1916. The constituency returned one Member of Parliament (MP) to the House of Commons of the United Kingdom, elected by the first past the post voting system.

== Vacancy ==
Rt Hon. Jack Pease had been Liberal MP for the seat of Rotherham since the 1910 Rotherham by-election. In 1916, he was appointed Postmaster General, an office of profit under the Crown and therefore required to seek re-election.

== Electoral history ==
This was a safe Liberal seat and at the last General Election, Pease was re-elected comfortably;

General election December 1910: Rotherham Electorate
Party	Candidate	Votes	%	±%
Liberal	Jack Pease	9,385	67.5	−4.9
Conservative	J. H. Dransfield	4,511	32.5	+4.9
Majority		4,874	35.0	−9.8
Turnout		13,896	67.8	−14.7
Liberal hold		Swing	-4.9	

== Result ==
Due to the war-time electoral truce between the main parties, Pease did not face a Unionist or Labour Party opponent. He was returned unopposed.

== Aftermath ==
Pease was made Baron Gainford in 1917 which resulted in the 1917 Rotherham by-election.
