= Rotherham (constituency) =

Parliamentary constituency in the United Kingdom, 1885 onwards

Coordinates: 53.43°N 1.36°W

- Borough constituency for the House of Commons
- Boundaries since 2024
- Boundary of Rotherham in Yorkshire and the Humber
- County: South Yorkshire
- Electorate: 61,119 (December 2019)
- Major settlements: Rotherham

Current constituency
- Created: 1885
- Member of Parliament: Sarah Champion (Labour)
- Seats: One
- Created from: Southern West Riding of Yorkshire

Rotherham is a constituency (Note: A borough constituency (for the purposes of election expenses and type of returning officer)) represented in the House of Commons of the UK Parliament since 2012 by Sarah Champion of the Labour Party. (Note: As with all constituencies, the constituency elects one Member of Parliament (MP) by the first past the post system of election at least every five years.)

== Constituency profile ==
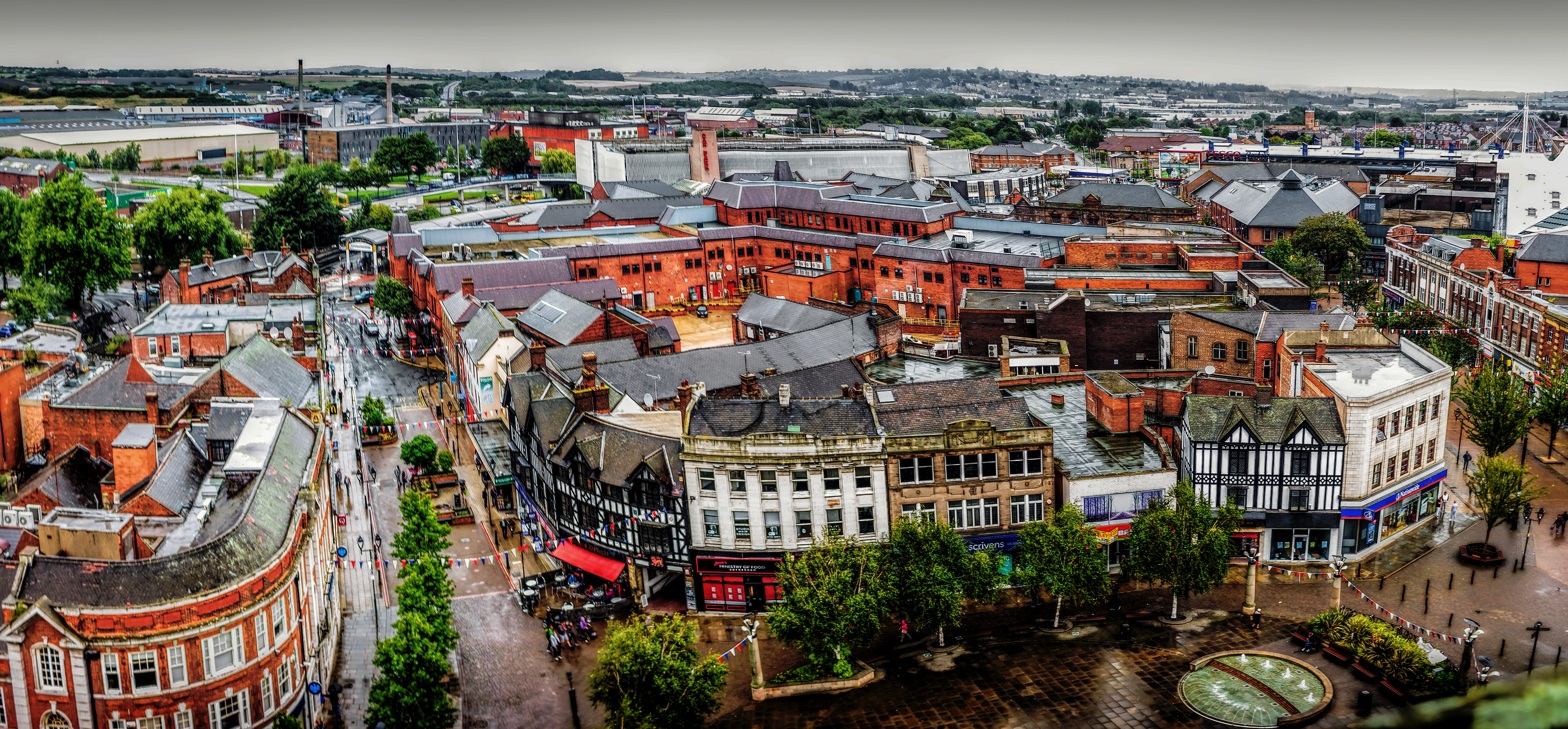
Rotherham town centre

Rotherham is a constituency in South Yorkshire in England. It is centred on the town of Rotherham and also includes the outlying villages of Thorpe Hesley, Thrybergh, Bramley, Brinsworth, Waverley and Treeton.

Rotherham is a large market town that forms part of Sheffield's wider urban area. The Industrial Revolution made the town an important centre for coal mining and later for the production of iron and steel. Deindustrialisation in the late 20th century had a negative effect on the town; today this is one of the country's most deprived constituencies with much of the town falling within the top 10% most-deprived areas in England. Most of the town's residents live in dense flats or terraces built to house industrial workers, although some of the town's outer areas like Waverley, Thorpe Hesley and Bramley are more affluent and contain recent suburban development. House prices in this constituency are generally lower than the rest of Yorkshire and the average price is less than half the overall UK average.

Residents of Rotherham have a similar age profile to the rest of the country, but with a slightly below-average proportion of retirees. They have low levels of income and homeownership and the child poverty rate is high. Residents have very low levels of education and a high proportion work in the health, manufacturing and public sectors. The percentage claiming unemployment benefits is above average. White people made up 84% of the population at the 2021 census. Asians, mostly of Pakistani origin, were the largest ethnic minority group at 10% and were largely concentrated in the neighbourhoods south of the town centre where they made up around a third of residents.

At the local borough council, most of the constituency is represented by the Labour Party with some independent councillors elected in the south of the town. Voters in Rotherham strongly supported leaving the European Union in the 2016 referendum; an estimated 69% voted in favour of Brexit compared to the UK-wide figure of 52%, making Rotherham one of the top 25 most Brexit-supporting constituencies out of 650 nationwide according to Electoral Calculus.

== History ==
This constituency was created in the Redistribution of Seats Act 1885.

Rotherham has consistently returned Labour MPs since a by-election in 1933, following the earlier period before 1923 dominated by the Liberal and Conservative parties. The numerical Labour majority in every general election from 1935 onwards has been in five figures, with the exceptions of 2015, 2019 and 2024.

== Boundaries ==
=== Historic ===
1885-1918: The Municipal Borough of Rotherham and part of Upper Strafforth and Tickhill petty sessional division, namely the parishes of Aston cum Aughton, Bramley, Brampton en le Morthen, Brinsworth, Catcliffe, Dalton, Denaby, Greasbrough, Hooton Roberts, Kimberworth, Orgreave, Ravenfield, Rawmarsh, Rotherham, Swinton, Thrybergh, Tinsley, Treeton, Ulley, Wallingwells, Whiston and Wickersley.

1918–1950: The County Borough of Rotherham, and the Urban Districts of Greasbrough and Rawmarsh.

1950–1983: The County Borough of Rotherham.

1983–2010: The Borough of Rotherham wards of Boston, Broom, Central, Greasbrough, Herringthorpe, Kimberworth, Park and Thorpe Hesley.

2010–2024: The Rotherham borough electoral wards of Boston Castle, Brinsworth and Catcliffe, Keppel, Rotherham East, Rotherham West, Valley, and Wingfield.

=== Current ===
Following the 2023 review of Westminster constituencies which came into effect for the 2024 general election, the constituency comprises the following:

- The Metropolitan Borough of Rotherham wards of: Boston Castle; Brinsworth; Dalton & Thrybergh; Greasbrough; Keppel; Rother Vale; Rotherham East; Rotherham West; Wickersley North.

Seat expanded to bring its electorate within the permitted range primarily by adding parts of the abolished constituency of Wentworth and Dearne, including northern parts of Wickersley and the village of Thrybergh.

It borders Rother Valley, Sheffield South East, Sheffield Brightside and Hillsborough, Penistone and Stocksbridge, and Rawmarsh and Conisbrough.

== Members of Parliament ==
Election	Member	Party
1885	Arthur Dyke Acland	Liberal
1899 by-election	William Holland	Liberal
1910 by-election	Jack Pease	Liberal
1917 by-election	Arthur Richardson	Lib-Lab
1918	Frederic Kelley	Conservative
1923	Fred Lindley	Labour
1931	George Herbert	Conservative
1933 by-election	William Dobbie	Labour
1950	Jack Jones	Labour
1963 by-election	Brian O'Malley	Labour
1976 by-election	Stan Crowther	Labour
1992	Jimmy Boyce	Labour
1994 by-election	Denis MacShane	Labour
2010	Denis MacShane	Independent
2012	Denis MacShane	Labour
2012 by-election	Sarah Champion	Labour

== Elections ==
Rotherham election results

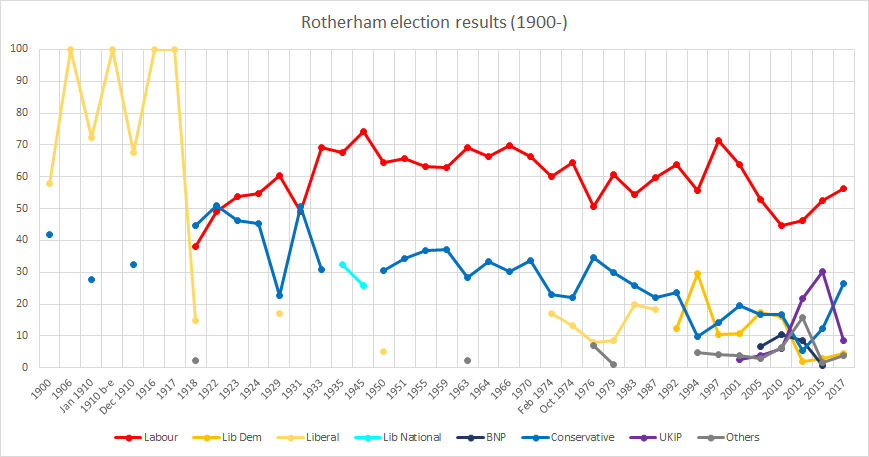
Rotherham historical election results

=== Elections in the 2020s ===
General election 2024: Rotherham
Party	Candidate	Votes	%	±%
Labour	Sarah Champion	16,671	45.1	+4.4
Reform	John Cronly	11,181	30.3	+13.3
Liberal Democrats	Adam Carter	2,824	7.6	+1.4
Green	Tony Mabbott	2,632	7.1	+7.0
Workers Party	Taukir Iqbal	1,714	4.6	New
Yorkshire	David Atkinson	1,363	3.7	+0.8
Independent	Ishtiaq Ahmad	547	1.5	New
Majority		5,490	14.9	+7.3
Turnout		36,932	48.6	−9.2
Registered electors		75,929		
Labour hold		Swing	−4.5	

Laila Cunningham was originally selected as the Conservative candidate for the seat, but withdrew shortly before the nominations deadline. As the party did not field a replacement, it is the only seat in Great Britain, aside from the Speaker's seat of Chorley, in which no Conservative candidate was nominated.

=== Elections in the 2010s ===
2019 notional result
Party	Vote	%
Labour	17,699	40.7
Conservative	14,402	33.1
Brexit Party	7,408	17.0
Liberal Democrats	2,717	6.2
Others	1,245	2.9
Green	50	0.1
Turnout	43,521	57.8
Electorate	75,345	

General election 2019: Rotherham
Party	Candidate	Votes	%	±%
Labour	Sarah Champion	14,736	41.3	−15.1
Conservative	Gerri Hickton	11,615	32.6	+6.2
Brexit Party	Paul Hague	6,125	17.2	New
Liberal Democrats	Adam Carter	2,090	5.9	+1.3
Yorkshire	Dennis Bannan	1,085	3.0	−0.8
Majority		3,121	8.7	−21.2
Turnout		35,651	57.8	−2.4
Labour hold		Swing	−10.7	

General election 2017: Rotherham
Party	Candidate	Votes	%	±%
Labour	Sarah Champion	21,404	56.4	+3.9
Conservative	James Bellis	10,017	26.4	+14.1
UKIP	Allen Cowles	3,316	8.7	−21.5
Liberal Democrats	Adam Carter	1,754	4.6	+1.7
Yorkshire	Mick Bower	1,432	3.8	New
Majority		11,387	29.9	+7.6
Turnout		38,050	60.2	+0.8
Labour hold		Swing	−5.1	

General election 2015: Rotherham
Party	Candidate	Votes	%	±%
Labour	Sarah Champion	19,860	52.5	+7.9
UKIP	Jane Collins	11,414	30.2	+24.3
Conservative	Sebastian Lowe	4,656	12.3	−4.4
Liberal Democrats	Janice Middleton	1,093	2.9	−13.1
TUSC	Pat McLaughlin	409	1.1	New
BNP	Adam Walker	225	0.6	−9.8
English Democrat	Dean Walker	166	0.4	New
Majority		8,446	22.3	−5.6
Turnout		37,823	59.4	+0.4
Labour hold		Swing	−8.2	

2012 Rotherham by-election
Party	Candidate	Votes	%	±%
Labour	Sarah Champion	9,966	46.3	+1.7
UKIP	Jane Collins	4,648	21.8	+15.9
BNP	Marlene Guest	1,804	8.5	−1.9
Respect	Yvonne Ridley	1,778	8.3	New
Conservative	Simon Wilson	1,157	5.4	−11.3
English Democrat	David Wildgoose	703	3.3	New
Independent	Simon Copley	582	2.7	New
Liberal Democrats	Michael Beckett	451	2.1	−13.9
TUSC	Ralph Dyson	261	1.2	New
Independent	Paul Dickson	51	0.2	New
no description	Clint Bristow	29	0.1	New
Majority		5,318	24.5	−3.4
Turnout		21,430	33.63	−25.37
Labour hold		Swing	−7.1	

General election 2010: Rotherham
Party	Candidate	Votes	%	±%
Labour	Denis MacShane	16,741	44.6	−13.1
Conservative	Jackie Whiteley	6,279	16.7	+3.4
Liberal Democrats	Rebecca Taylor	5,994	16.0	−0.4
BNP	Marlene Guest	3,906	10.4	+4.5
Independent	Peter Thirlwall	2,366	6.3	New
UKIP	Caven Vines	2,220	5.9	+2.0
Majority		10,462	27.9	−7.7
Turnout		37,506	59.0	+4.9
Labour hold		Swing	−8.3	

=== Elections in the 2000s ===
General election 2005: Rotherham
Party	Candidate	Votes	%	±%
Labour	Denis MacShane	15,840	52.8	−11.1
Liberal Democrats	Tim Gordon	5,159	17.2	+6.6
Conservative	Lee Rotherham	4,966	16.6	−2.8
BNP	Marlene Guest	1,986	6.6	New
UKIP	David Cutts	1,122	3.7	+1.2
Green	Dick Penycate	905	3.0	+1.0
Majority		10,681	35.6	−8.9
Turnout		29,978	55.1	+4.4
Labour hold		Swing	−8.8	

General election 2001: Rotherham
Party	Candidate	Votes	%	±%
Labour	Denis MacShane	18,759	63.9	−7.4
Conservative	Richard Powell	5,682	19.4	+5.1
Liberal Democrats	Charles Hall	3,117	10.6	+0.2
UKIP	Peter Griffith	729	2.5	New
Green	Dick Penycate	577	2.0	New
Socialist Alliance	Freda Smith	352	1.2	New
John Lilburne Democratic Party	Geoffrey Bartholomew	138	0.5	New
Majority		13,077	44.5	−12.5
Turnout		29,354	50.7	−11.8
Labour hold		Swing	−6.25	

=== Elections in the 1990s ===
General election 1997: Rotherham
Party	Candidate	Votes	%	±%
Labour	Denis MacShane	26,852	71.3	+7.4
Conservative	Simon Gordon	5,383	14.3	−9.4
Liberal Democrats	David B. Wildgoose	3,919	10.4	−1.9
Referendum	Ray T. Hollebone	1,132	3.0	New
ProLife Alliance	Andrew Neal	364	1.0	New
Majority		21,469	57.0	+16.8
Turnout		37,650	62.9	−8.8
Labour hold		Swing		

1994 Rotherham by-election
Party	Candidate	Votes	%	±%
Labour	Denis MacShane	14,912	55.6	−8.3
Liberal Democrats	David B. Wildgoose	7,958	29.7	+17.4
Conservative	Nick Gibb	2,649	9.9	−13.8
Monster Raving Loony	Screaming Lord Sutch	1,114	4.2	New
Natural Law	Keith Laycock	173	0.6	New
Majority		6,954	25.9	−14.3
Turnout		26,806	43.7	−28.0
Labour hold		Swing	−2.8	

General election 1992: Rotherham
Party	Candidate	Votes	%	±%
Labour	Jimmy Boyce	27,933	63.9	+4.2
Conservative	Stephen J.D. Yorke	10,372	23.7	+1.6
Liberal Democrats	David B. Wildgoose	5,375	12.3	−5.9
Majority		17,561	40.2	+2.6
Turnout		43,680	71.7	+2.5
Labour hold		Swing	+1.3	

=== Elections in the 1980s ===
General election 1987: Rotherham
Party	Candidate	Votes	%	±%
Labour	Stanley Crowther	25,422	59.7	+5.4
Conservative	John Stephens	9,410	22.1	−3.6
Liberal	Peter Bowler	7,766	18.2	−1.8
Majority		16,012	37.6	+9.0
Turnout		42,598	69.2	+2.2
Labour hold		Swing		

General election 1983: Rotherham
Party	Candidate	Votes	%	±%
Labour	Stanley Crowther	22,236	54.3	−6.3
Conservative	Chris Middleton	10,527	25.7	−4.2
Liberal	Pete Bowler	8,192	20.0	+11.6
Majority		11,709	28.6	−2.1
Turnout		40,955	67.0	−5.1
Labour hold		Swing		

=== Elections in the 1970s ===
General election 1979: Rotherham
Party	Candidate	Votes	%	±%
Labour	Stanley Crowther	26,580	60.6	−4.0
Conservative	D. Hinckley	13,145	29.9	+7.8
Liberal	I. House	3,686	8.4	−5.0
National Front	K. Davies	490	1.1	N/A
Majority		13,435	30.7	−11.8
Turnout		43,901	72.1	+6.6
Labour hold		Swing		

1976 Rotherham by-election
Party	Candidate	Votes	%	±%
Labour	Stanley Crowther	14,351	50.69	−13.89
Conservative	Douglas Hinckley	9,824	34.70	+12.64
Liberal	Beth Graham	2,214	7.82	−5.53
National Front	George Wright	1,696	5.99	New
World Grid Sunshine Room Party	Peter Bishop	129	0.46	New
English National	Robin Atkinson	99	0.35	New
Majority		4,527	15.99	−26.51
Turnout		28,313		
Labour hold		Swing		

General election October 1974: Rotherham
Party	Candidate	Votes	%	±%
Labour	Brian O'Malley	25,874	64.6	+4.6
Conservative	Richard Hambro	8,840	22.1	−0.8
Liberal	V. Bottomley	5,350	13.4	−3.7
Majority		17,034	42.5	+5.4
Turnout		40,064	65.5	−8.8
Labour hold		Swing	+2.7	

General election February 1974: Rotherham
Party	Candidate	Votes	%	±%
Labour	Brian O'Malley	27,088	60.0	−6.4
Conservative	D. Lewis	10,354	22.9	−10.7
Liberal	J. Hughes	7,726	17.1	New
Majority		16,734	37.1	+4.3
Turnout		45,168	74.3	+11.4
Labour hold		Swing		

General election 1970: Rotherham
Party	Candidate	Votes	%	±%
Labour	Brian O'Malley	25,246	66.4	−3.3
Conservative	Eric R. Cooke	12,770	33.6	+3.3
Majority		12,476	32.8	−5.6
Turnout		38,016	62.9	−5.8
Labour hold		Swing		

=== Elections in the 1960s ===
General election 1966: Rotherham
Party	Candidate	Votes	%	±%
Labour	Brian O'Malley	27,402	69.7	+3.2
Conservative	Eric R. Cooke	11,925	30.3	−3.2
Majority		15,477	39.4	+6.4
Turnout		39,327	68.7	−2.9
Labour hold		Swing		

General election 1964: Rotherham
Party	Candidate	Votes	%	±%
Labour	Brian O'Malley	27,585	66.5	+3.7
Conservative	John Michael Barrass	13,907	33.5	−3.7
Majority		13,678	33.0	+4.4
Turnout		41,492	71.6	−7.3
Labour hold		Swing		

1963 Rotherham by-election
Party	Candidate	Votes	%	±%
Labour	Brian O'Malley	22,411	69.2	+6.4
Conservative	John Michael Barrass	9,209	28.5	−8.7
Independent	Russell Ernest Eckley	742	2.3	New
Majority		13,202	40.7	+15.1
Turnout		32,362		
Labour hold		Swing		

=== Elections in the 1950s ===
General election 1959: Rotherham
Party	Candidate	Votes	%	±%
Labour	Jack Jones	28,298	62.8	−0.5
Conservative	Ronald Hall	16,759	37.2	+0.5
Majority		11,539	25.6	−1.0
Turnout		45,057	78.9	+1.5
Labour hold		Swing		

General election 1955: Rotherham
Party	Candidate	Votes	%	±%
Labour	Jack Jones	27,423	63.3	−2.3
Conservative	William G. Blake	15,882	36.7	+2.3
Majority		11,541	26.6	−4.6
Turnout		43,305	77.4	−6.8
Labour hold		Swing		

General election 1951: Rotherham
Party	Candidate	Votes	%	±%
Labour	Jack Jones	31,124	65.6	+1.2
Conservative	William G. Blake	16,317	34.4	+3.9
Majority		14,807	31.2	−2.7
Turnout		47,441	84.2	−3.1
Labour hold		Swing		

General election 1950: Rotherham
Party	Candidate	Votes	%	±%
Labour	Jack Jones	31,211	64.4	−9.8
Conservative	Richard Body	14,744	30.5	+4.7
Liberal	M. Foster	2,458	5.1	New
Majority		16,467	33.9	−14.5
Turnout		48,413	87.3	+10.9
Labour hold		Swing		

=== Elections in the 1940s ===
General election 1945: Rotherham
Party	Candidate	Votes	%	±%
Labour	William Dobbie	35,654	74.2	+6.7
National Liberal	E. H. Phillips	12,420	25.8	−6.7
Majority		23,234	48.4	+13.4
Turnout		48,074	76.4	−0.3
Labour hold		Swing		

=== Elections in the 1930s ===
Thomas Casey

General election 1935: Rotherham
Party	Candidate	Votes	%	±%
Labour	William Dobbie	29,725	67.5	−1.6
National Liberal	Thomas Worrall Casey	14,298	32.5	+1.6
Majority		15,427	35.0	−3.2
Turnout		44,023	76.7	+3.2
Labour hold		Swing		

1933 Rotherham by-election
Party	Candidate	Votes	%	±%
Labour	William Dobbie	28,767	69.1	+19.9
Conservative	Henry Drummond Wolff	12,893	30.9	−19.9
Majority		15,874	38.2	N/A
Turnout		41,660	73.5	−9.1
Labour gain from Conservative		Swing		

General election 1931: Rotherham
Party	Candidate	Votes	%	±%
Conservative	George Herbert	23,596	50.8	+28.1
Labour	Fred Lindley	22,834	49.2	−11.2
Majority		762	1.6	N/A
Turnout		46,430	82.6	+1.2
Conservative gain from Labour		Swing		

=== Elections in the 1920s ===
General election 1929: Rotherham
Party	Candidate	Votes	%	±%
Labour	Fred Lindley	26,937	60.4	+5.8
Unionist	Paul Latham	10,101	22.7	−26.7
Liberal	Reeves Charlesworth	7,534	16.9	New
Majority		16,836	37.7	+28.5
Turnout		44,572	81.4	−0.4
Labour hold		Swing		

General election 1924: Rotherham
Party	Candidate	Votes	%	±%
Labour	Fred Lindley	18,860	54.6	+0.7
Unionist	Henry J Temple	15,712	45.4	−0.7
Majority		3,148	9.2	+1.4
Turnout		34,572	81.8	+6.5
Labour hold		Swing		

General election 1923: Rotherham
Party	Candidate	Votes	%	±%
Labour	Fred Lindley	16,983	53.9	+4.9
Unionist	Frederic Kelley	14,535	46.1	−4.9
Majority		2,448	7.8	N/A
Turnout		31,518	75.3	−6.3
Labour gain from Unionist		Swing	+4.9	

General election 1922: Rotherham
Party	Candidate	Votes	%	±%
Unionist	Frederic Kelley	17,093	51.0	+6.2
Labour	James Walker	16,449	49.0	+10.9
Majority		644	2.0	−4.7
Turnout		33,542	81.6	+18.4
Unionist hold		Swing		

=== Elections in the 1910s ===
JM Kenworthy

General election 1918: Rotherham
Party	Candidate	Votes	%	±%
Unionist	Frederic Kelley	11,473	44.8	+12.3
Labour	James Walker	9,757	38.1	New
Liberal	Joseph Kenworthy	3,805	14.9	−52.6
National Democratic	Edmund Smith Bardsley	564	2.2	New
Majority		1,716	6.7	N/A
Turnout		25,599	63.2	−4.6
Unionist gain from Liberal		Swing	+32.5	

Richardson

1917 Rotherham by-election
Party	Candidate	Votes	%	±%
Lib-Lab	Arthur Richardson	Unopposed		
Lib-Lab hold				

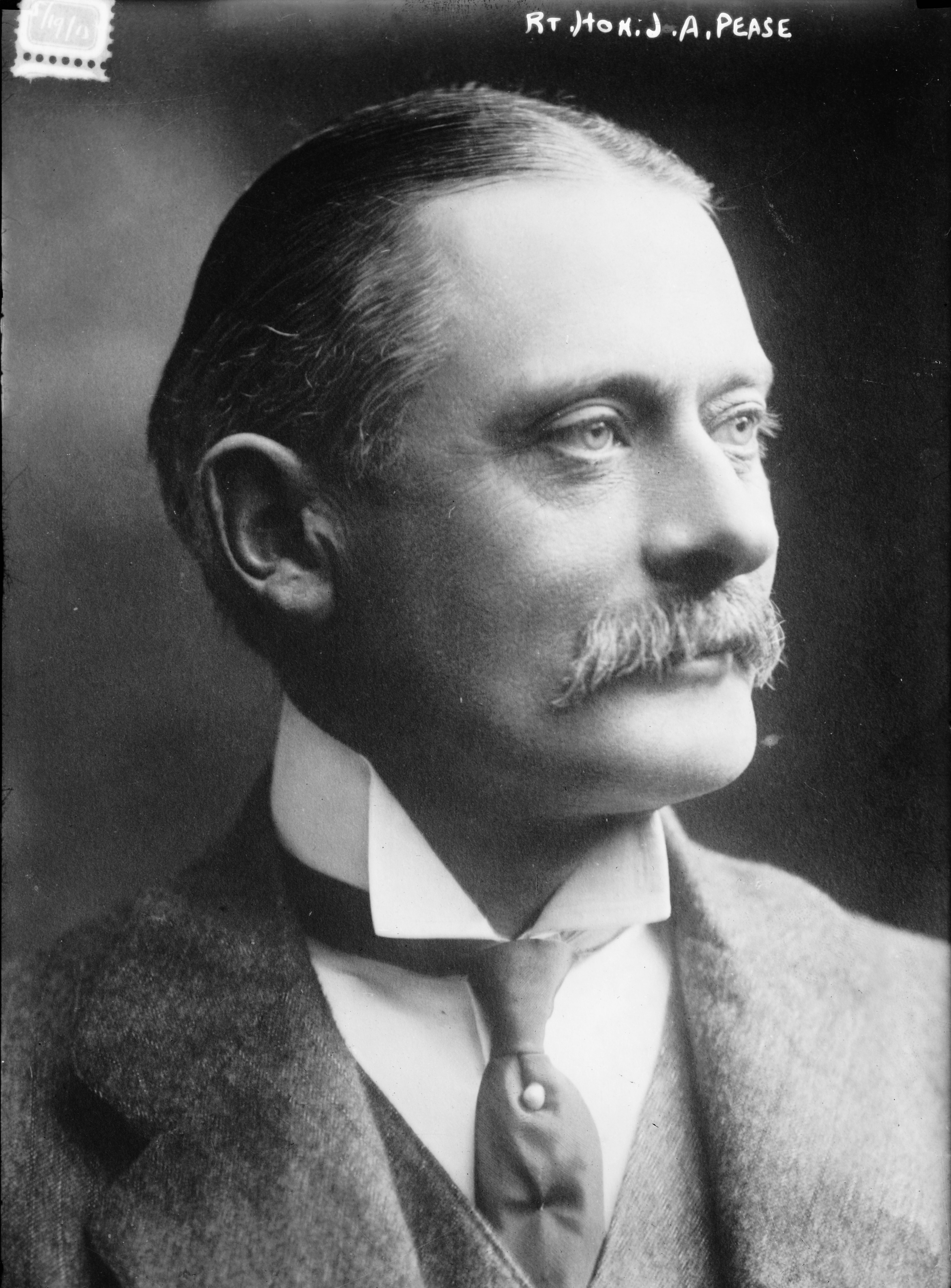
Jack Pease

1916 Rotherham by-election
Party	Candidate	Votes	%	±%
Liberal	Jack Pease	Unopposed		
Liberal hold				

General election December 1910: Rotherham
Party	Candidate	Votes	%	±%
Liberal	Jack Pease	9,385	67.5	−4.9
Conservative	James Harrop Dransfield	4,511	32.5	+4.9
Majority		4,874	35.0	−9.8
Turnout		13,896	67.8	−14.7
Registered electors		20,487		
Liberal hold		Swing	−4.9	

1910 Rotherham by-election
Party	Candidate	Votes	%	±%
Liberal	Jack Pease	Unopposed		
Liberal hold				

General election January 1910: Rotherham
Party	Candidate	Votes	%	±%
Liberal	William Holland	12,225	72.4	N/A
Conservative	James Dransfield	4,667	27.6	New
Majority		7,558	44.8	N/A
Turnout		16,892	82.5	N/A
Registered electors		20,487		
Liberal hold		Swing	N/A	

=== Elections in the 1900s ===
General election 1906: Rotherham
Party	Candidate	Votes	%	±%
Liberal	William Holland	Unopposed		
Liberal hold				

General election 1900: Rotherham
Party	Candidate	Votes	%	±%
Liberal	William Holland	6,926	58.0	N/A
Conservative	R. H. V. Wragge	5,021	42.0	N/A
Majority		1,905	16.0	N/A
Turnout		11,947	78.0	N/A
Registered electors		15,325		
Liberal hold		Swing	N/A	

=== Elections in the 1890s ===
William Holland

1899 Rotherham by-election
Party	Candidate	Votes	%	±%
Liberal	William Holland	6,671	58.6	N/A
Conservative	Robert Horton Vernon Wragge	4,714	41.4	New
Majority		1,957	17.2	N/A
Turnout		11,385	77.1	N/A
Registered electors		14,763		
Liberal hold		Swing	N/A	

- Caused by Acland's resignation.

General election 1895: Rotherham
Party	Candidate	Votes	%	±%
Liberal	Arthur Dyke Acland	Unopposed		
Liberal hold				

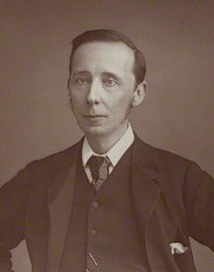
Acland

1892 Rotherham by-election
Party	Candidate	Votes	%	±%
Liberal	Arthur Dyke Acland	Unopposed		
Liberal hold				

- Caused by Acland's appointment as Vice President of the Committee of the Council on Education

General election 1892: Rotherham
Party	Candidate	Votes	%	±%
Liberal	Arthur Dyke Acland	6,567	69.8	−1.5
Liberal Unionist	George Savile Foljambe	2,839	30.2	+1.5
Majority		3,728	39.6	−3.0
Turnout		9,406	69.4	+2.1
Registered electors		13,551		
Liberal hold		Swing	−1.5	

=== Elections in the 1880s ===
General election 1886: Rotherham
Party	Candidate	Votes	%	±%
Liberal	Arthur Dyke Acland	5,155	71.3	−2.3
Liberal Unionist	Francis Foljambe	2,070	28.7	+2.3
Majority		3,085	42.6	−4.6
Turnout		7,225	67.3	−12.5
Registered electors		10,730		
Liberal hold		Swing	−2.3	

General election 1885: Rotherham
Party	Candidate	Votes	%	±%
Liberal	Arthur Dyke Acland	6,301	73.6	
Conservative	William Wright Hoole	2,258	26.4	
Majority		4,043	47.2	
Turnout		8,559	79.8	
Registered electors		10,730		
Liberal win (new seat)				

== See also ==
- parliamentary constituencies in South Yorkshire
- List of parliamentary constituencies in the Yorkshire and the Humber (region)

== Sources ==
- BBC News, Election 2005
- BBC News, Vote 2001
- Guardian Unlimited Politics
- http://www.psr.keele.ac.uk/ (Election results from 1951 to the present)
- F. W. S. Craig, British Parliamentary Election Results 1918 – 1949
- F. W. S. Craig, British Parliamentary Election Results 1950 – 1970
