= Stan Crowther =

Stan Crowther is the name of:

- Stanley Crowther (1925–2013), British Labour MP
- Stan Crowther (footballer) (1935–2014), English footballer
