= Baron Rotherham =

Extinct barony in the Peerage of the United Kingdom

Escutcheon of the Holland baronets and Barons Rotherham

Baron Rotherham, of Broughton in the County Palatine of Lancaster, was a title in the Peerage of the United Kingdom. It was created on 18 July 1910 for the industrialist and Liberal politician Sir William Holland, 1st Baronet. He had already been created a baronet, of Queen's Gate, in the Royal Borough of Kensington in the Baronetage of the United Kingdom on 18 July 1907. Both titles became extinct on the death of his son, the second Baron, on 24 January 1950.

== Barons Rotherham (1910) ==
- William Henry Holland, 1st Baron Rotherham (1849–1927)
- Stuart Lund Holland, 2nd Baron Rotherham (1876–1950)

Baronetage of the United Kingdom
Preceded by Treloar baronets	Holland baronets of Broughton; 18 July 1907	Succeeded by Herbert baronets
