= William Dobbie (politician) =

British Labour Party politician

Alderman William Dobbie CBE

Lord Mayor of York
- In office 1947–1948
- Preceded by: Fred Gaines
- Succeeded by: John Bowes Morrell
- In office 1923–1924
- Preceded by: James Brown Inglis
- Succeeded by: Robert Kay

Member of Parliament for Rotherham
- In office 27 February 1933 – 3 February 1950
- Preceded by: George Herbert
- Succeeded by: John Henry Jones

City of York Councillor
- In office 1911–1950

Personal details
- Born: 1878 Maybole, Scotland
- Died: 19 January 1950 (aged 71–72) York, England
- Party: Labour

William Dobbie CBE (1878 – 19 January 1950) was a British Labour Party politician.

Dobbie was born in Maybole, Ayrshire. When he was just two-years-old, his parents, Francis Dobbie and Agnes McCreath, died there leaving two young sons, William and his brother James aged six. James remained in Maybole with his maternal grandparents while William was raised in Glasgow by his aunt.

Dobbie became a railway employee and moved to York and became a councillor in 1911. He became active in the General Railway Workers' Union, and was its president in 1913, when it became part of the National Union of Railwaymen (NUR). During World War I, he served in the British Army and was wounded. After the war he became an alderman of York and in 1923 was elected Lord Mayor of York, the first Labour mayor of the city. He was President of the NUR from 1925 to 1927 and 1931–1933.

Dobbie stood for Parliament without success for Barkston Ash in 1924 and Clitheroe in 1929 before being elected Member of Parliament (MP) for Rotherham in a by-election in 1933. In 1936, during the Spanish Civil War, Dobbie visited the Alcazar, a military academy under siege by Republican troops. Willie Forrest, who arrived in a chauffeur-driven Rolls-Royce requisitioned from a Royalist nobleman said of the occasion, "I took William Dobbie, a visiting Labour MP, up a church tower from which you get a wonderful view of the Alcazar's courtyard. There was a machine-gun in the tower and Dobbie couldn't resist the temptation to fire it at the fascists." William Dobbie later served a second term as Lord Mayor in 1947 and in the same year was made a CBE (it is said he refused a knighthood), remaining a Member of Parliament until his death.

Parliament of the United Kingdom
Preceded by George Herbert	Member of Parliament for Rotherham; 1933–1950	Succeeded by Jack Jones
Trade union offices
Preceded by John Marchbank	President of the National Union of Railwaymen; 1925–1927	Succeeded by J. Gore
Preceded by J. Gore	President of the National Union of Railwaymen; 1931–1933	Succeeded by Joseph Henderson
