= Sarah Champion =

British politician (born 1969)

Sarah Champion MP
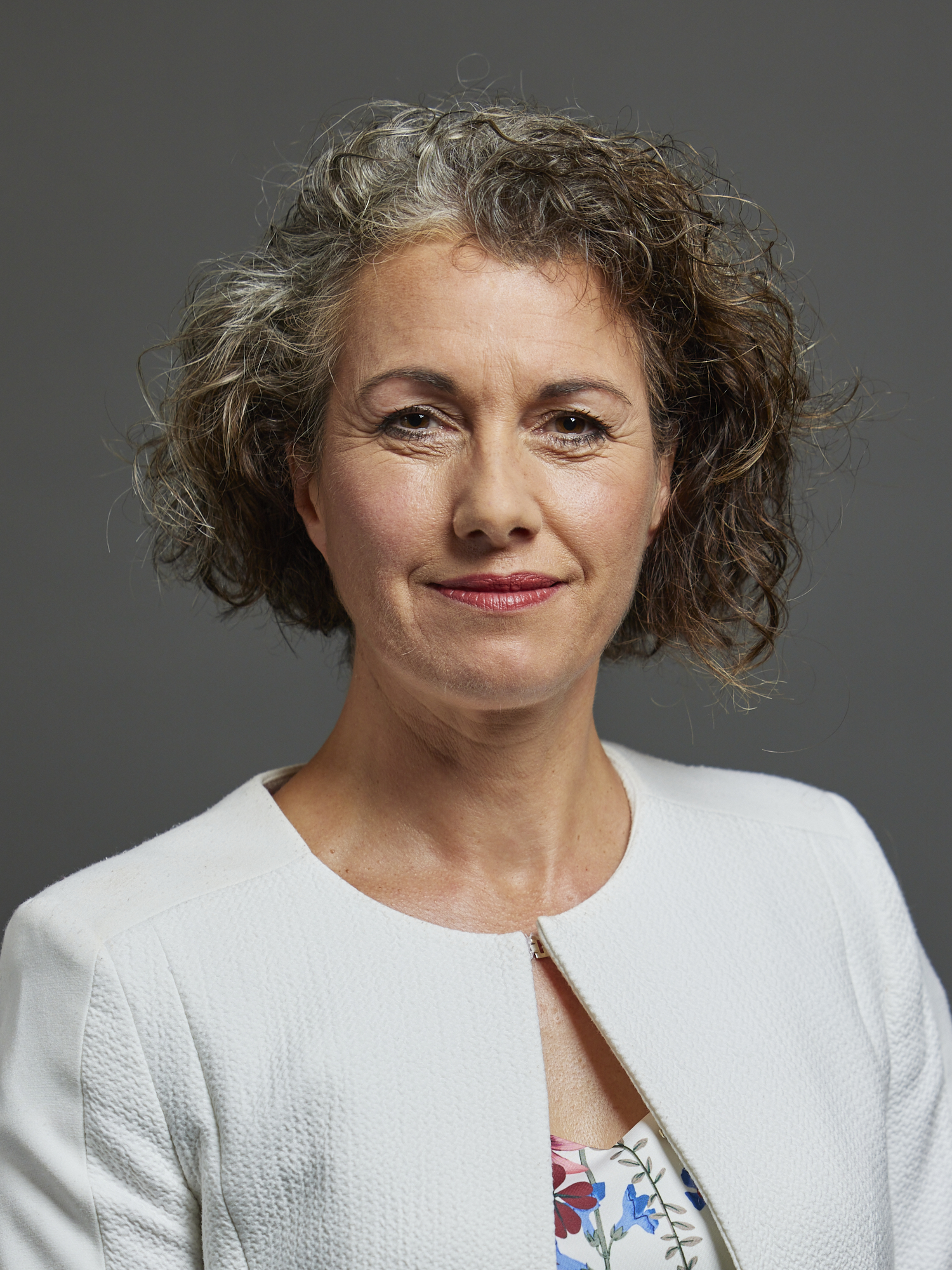
- Official portrait, 2024

Chair of the International Development Select Committee
- Incumbent
- Assumed office 29 January 2020
- Preceded by: Stephen Twigg

Shadow Secretary of State for Women and Equalities
- In office 6 October 2016 – 16 August 2017
- Leader: Jeremy Corbyn
- Preceded by: Angela Rayner
- Succeeded by: Dawn Butler

Member of Parliament for Rotherham
- Incumbent
- Assumed office 29 November 2012
- Preceded by: Denis MacShane
- Majority: 5,490 (14.9%)

Personal details
- Born: Sarah Deborah Champion; 10 July 1969 (age 57) Maldon, Essex, England
- Party: Labour
- Spouse: Graham Hoyland (m. 1999; div. 2007)
- Education: University of Sheffield (BA)
- Website: Official website

Sarah Deborah Champion (born 10 July 1969) is a British Labour Party politician who has served as the Member of Parliament (MP) for Rotherham since 2012.

Champion is Chair of the International Development Select Committee, a position she was first elected to in 2020. She was re-elected to the role shortly after the 2024 general election.

Champion was appointed by Jeremy Corbyn as Shadow Minister for Preventing Abuse in September 2015. She resigned in June 2016, but returned to the frontbench shortly after, in the same post.

In October 2016, she was promoted to the Shadow Cabinet as Shadow Secretary of State for Women and Equalities, which she stepped down from in August 2017, following her article on grooming gangs.

Champion studied psychology at Sheffield University. Before entering Parliament, she ran a Chinese Arts Centre in Manchester and was employed as the Chief Executive of a children's hospice in Rotherham.

Champion was first elected to Parliament at Rotherham's 2012 by-election.

== Parliamentary career ==
=== 1st term (2012–2015) ===
In November 2012 Champion was selected to be Labour's candidate for the upcoming Rotherham by-election, which was triggered by the resignation of the constituency's MP, Denis MacShane. At the by-election, Champion was elected as MP for Rotherham with 46.3% of the vote and a majority of 5,318.

In an interview with BBC Radio Sheffield on 30 November 2012, Champion said that she does not regard herself as being a career politician: "There are some people who from the moment they were born wanted to be a politician. Whereas for me, since I started working I've always been working with the community and I want to carry on doing that."

In a 2014 BBC interview, Champion admitted that she rarely attends Prime Minister's Questions.

In December 2014, Champion took a Ten Minute Rule Bill to Parliament, asking for the mandatory publishing of figures of the pay gap between men and women in any company of over 250 employees. The Bill was overwhelmingly supported by MPs, with 258 voting in support and just 8 voting against. In July 2015 the Prime Minister, David Cameron, announced that the Government would be adopting the measures put forward in Champion's Bill.

In November 2013, it was announced that Champion, in partnership with children's charity Barnardos, would lead a cross-party inquiry to investigate the effectiveness of the Sexual Offences Act 2003 in tackling child sexual exploitation and trafficking within the UK.

Champion conducted an inquiry with Barnardo's in 2013 to investigate how effectively children were, at that time, protected by the law from sexual exploitation. Later, in July 2014, and as a result of her inquiry, Champion successfully added an amendment to the Criminal Justice and Courts Bill that allowed a person caught arranging to meet a child for sex to be convicted straight away. Previously, the person had to be caught twice.

=== 2nd term (2015–2017) ===
Champion was re-elected as MP for Rotherham at the 2015 general election with an increased vote share of 52.5% and an increased majority of 8,446.

She was one of 36 Labour MPs to nominate Jeremy Corbyn as a candidate in the Labour leadership election of 2015.

Champion was appointed by Jeremy Corbyn as Shadow Minister for Preventing Abuse in September 2015, but resigned in June 2016, following a vote of no confidence in Corbyn. However, the next month she returned to the frontbench in the same post.

In 2016, Champion launched Dare2Care, a National Action Plan for Preventing Child Abuse and Violence in Teenage Relationships. Among Champion's key recommendations was the compulsory introduction of resilience and relationships education for all children from Key Stage One. Champion's campaign resulted in the Government introducing mandatory age-appropriate SRE for all children in the 2017 Children and Social Work Act.

Champion later publicly criticised the then Prime Minister, David Cameron, over a failure to carry out pledges made the previous year in tackling with child abuse. Champion highlighted the lack of progress over a national child abuse task force and a whistleblowing portal that had no 'taskforce to blow to' as well as the failure to begin a consultation on extending the offence of wilful neglect to children's social care, education and councils.

In October 2016, she was promoted to the Shadow Cabinet as Shadow Secretary of State for Women and Equalities.

=== 3rd term (2017–2019) ===
At the snap 2017 general election, Champion was again re-elected with an increased vote share of 56.4% and an increased majority of 11,387.

Champion resigned from her post as Shadow Secretary of State for Women and Equalities on 16 August 2017, following criticism of an opinion piece for The Sun titled "British Pakistani men ARE raping and exploiting white girls ... and it's time we faced up to it". The article went on to suggest that "Britain has a problem with British Pakistani men raping and exploiting white girls". Fellow Labour MP Naz Shah criticised Champion's statements, describing the headline as "incendiary" and "irresponsible".

On BBC Radio 4's Today programme Champion said that "more people are afraid to be called a racist than they are afraid to be wrong about calling out child abuse".

A few days later, Champion distanced herself from The Sun article, which she said should "not have gone out in my name", stating that the beginning of the article had been altered by the newspaper's staff resulting in the piece being "stripped of nuance". The newspaper said the article's final form had been approved by her team, and later produced an email from one of her aides confirming she was actually "thrilled" by the article.

In September 2017, the political commentator Iain Dale placed Champion at Number 92 on his list of the '100 most influential people on the Left'.

In November 2017, a fly-on-the-wall BBC documentary Labour: The Summer that Changed Everything made during the 2017 general election campaign was shown, with Champion as one of four MPs critical of Jeremy Corbyn's leadership who were followed for six weeks.

Champion repeatedly voted against Theresa May's Brexit deal. On 16 July 2019, Champion stated: "If my party comes out as a remain party rather than trying to find a deal or rather than trying to exit, I can't support that, it goes against democracy". She said she would rather support a "no-deal Brexit" than remain in the EU, as she believed Labour had to deliver the result of the 2016 referendum.

=== 4th term (2019–2024) ===
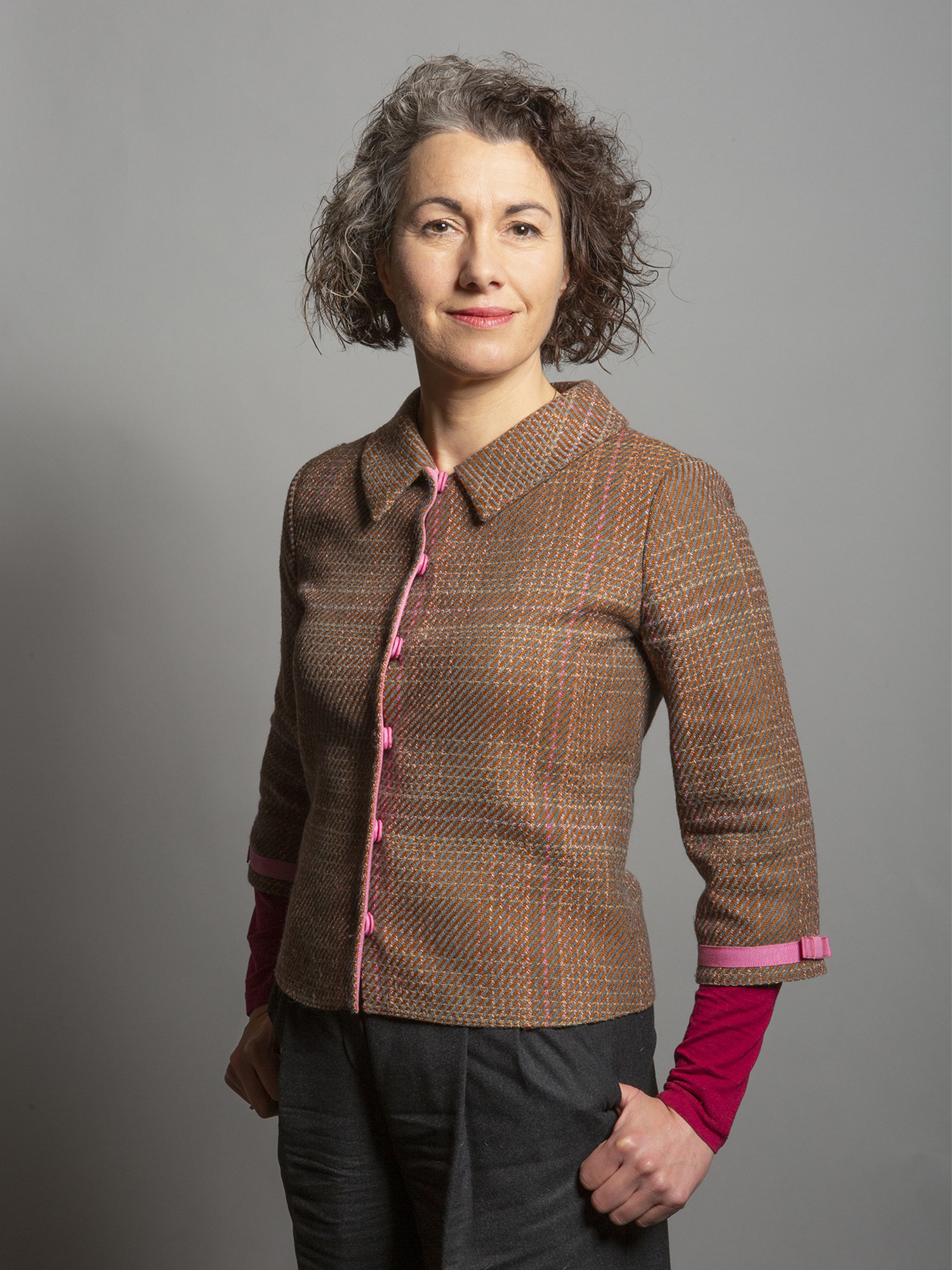
Champion's official Parliamentary portrait after being re-elected at the 2019 general election

At the 2019 general election Champion was again re-elected, with a decreased vote share of 41.3% and a decreased majority of 3,121.

In 2019, the APPG for Safeguarding in Faith Settings identified a loophole in the Sexual Offences Act that left 16 and 17-year-olds vulnerable to sexual abuse by adults, such as faith leaders, who hold a position of authority over them. Champion led a campaign in response, alongside Baroness Grey-Thompson and Tracey Crouch MP, both of whom exposed the same issue with regards to sports coaches. This resulted in the Government extending the Positions of Trust definition to include faith leaders and sports coaches as part of the Police, Crime Sentencing and Courts Bill.

In January 2020, Champion stood successfully to be the Chair of International Development Committee. She has served in that position since.

As one of 17 MPs to sit on Bill Committee for the Police, Crime, Sentencing and Courts Bill Champion called on the Government to implement a range of measures to prevent sexual abuse. This included calling for new measures to prevent Registered Sex Offenders from changing their name to evade detection, something the Government committed to taking forward.

=== 5th term (2024–present) ===
Champion was again re-elected at the 2024 general election, with an increased vote share of 45.1% and an increased majority of 5,490.

In September 2024, she was re-elected as Chair of the International Development Select Committee. Champion became a lead voice in responding to the Government's cuts to aid, from 0.5% of GNI to 0.3%, arguing that "cutting the aid budget to fund defence spending is a false economy that will only make the world less safe".

Champion also successfully campaigned to amend the Great British Energy Bill, to ensure it included provisions to prevent forced labour in the lower tiers of renewable supply chains.

Champion continued prior campaigns on child abuse, tabling several amendments to the Crime and Policing Bill, to strengthen measures around Registered Sex Offenders, Mandatory Reporting and Child Criminal Exploitation (CCE). This resulted in the Government committing to a statutory definition on CCE.

In January 2025, Champion called for a National Inquiry into Grooming Gangs.

Champion voted in favour of the Terminally Ill Adults (End of Life) Bill, which proposed to legalise assisted dying.

A keen ocean and conservation campaigner, Champion successfully campaigned the Government to ratify the Global Ocean Treaty through the introduction of the Biodiversity Beyond National Jurisdiction Bill.

In 2026, Sarah became a member of the Great British Energy Ethical Supply Chains Advisory Group.

=== Rotherham child sexual exploitation scandal ===
In response to the Jay Report, released in August 2014, which found 1,400 victims of child sexual exploitation in Rotherham between 1997 and 2013, Champion applauded the council for apologising and accepting the report. The following week Champion put a short question to the Home Secretary, saying she was angry, and asked for necessary resources to solve the problems.

In October 2014, Champion secured additional funding to appoint Jayne Senior, a specialist in child sexual exploitation, to support the 1,400 victims of child abuse in Rotherham.

In November 2014, Champion asked the Prime Minister to support Rotherham's victims and to ensure that procedures are in place to prevent such widespread abuse happening again. The Prime Minister replied in part that the Home Office was leading "this important effort" in getting departments to work together.

In 2015, three Rotherham Labour MPs, Kevin Barron, Champion and John Healey, started a defamation legal action against UKIP MEP Jane Collins after Collins falsely alleged in a UKIP conference speech that the three MPs knew about child exploitation in Rotherham but did not intervene, and in February 2017 the MPs were awarded £54,000 each in damages.

In January 2025, Champion called for a National Inquiry into Grooming Gangs alongside 3 other Labour MPs.

Champion published a 5-point-plan to address child sexual exploitation, which included the need to implement all the recommendations from the Independent Inquiry into Child Sexual Abuse (IICSA).

She led a cross-party pledge to end child sexual exploitation, supported by nearly 100 Parliamentarians. The Prime Minister committed to a National Inquiry on 15 June 2025, the day before the publishing of Baroness Casey's audit of group-based child sexual exploitation and abuse.

Following the campaign, The Times published a piece on Champion about her work to tackle child sexual abuse. Champion said "This is not in the past tense, we are still dealing with these cases in isolation, but they must be linked they are so similar".

== Select Committees and APPGs ==
Champion has previously been a member of the Transport Select Committee, Parliamentary Private Secretary to Shadow Education Secretary Tristram Hunt. She has been Chair of the International Development Select Committee since 2020.

As of July 2025, Champion is Chair of APPG Channel Islands, APPG Ocean, APPG Zoos and Aquariums, APPG Cayman Islands, and co-chair of APPG Global Sexual and Reproductive Health and Rights, and APPG Taiwan.

She is a member of several APPGs, including: APPG Africa, APPG Australia-New Zealand (ANZAC) and Pacific Islands, APPG Animal Welfare, APPG Cats, APPG Domestic Violence and Abuse, APPG Fusion, APPG Hong Kong, APPG Human Trafficking and Modern Slavery, APPG Humanist, APPG North Korea, APPG Nuclear Energy, APPG Pharmacy, APPG Sixth Form, APPG Steel, APPG Sudan and South Sudan, APPG Tibet.

== Personal life and career ==
Champion was born on 10 July 1969 in Maldon, and attended Prince William School in Oundle, before graduating with a BA degree in psychology from the University of Sheffield in 1991.

After working as a volunteer at Sheffield's St Luke's Hospice and running art workshops at a Sheffield secondary school, she gained full-time employment, running Rotherham Arts Centre from 1992 to 1994.

Champion then worked as an Arts Development Officer for Ashfield District Council. She ran the Chinese Arts Centre in Manchester from 1996 to 2008, and was the Chief Executive of the Bluebell Wood Children's Hospice in North Anston, Rotherham, from 2008 to 2012.

In 1999 Champion married Graham Hoyland; the couple divorced in 2007. In September 2016, it became known that Champion and Hoyland had got into a disagreement while seeking a divorce, leading to them both getting police cautions. Champion admitted she had "lost control" and said: "I'm not proud of what happened and I accept I was in the wrong but I have nothing to hide. I lost control after being provoked for years and for that I am sorry but I felt extremely vulnerable at that moment".

Parliament of the United Kingdom
Preceded by Denis MacShane	Member of Parliament for Rotherham; 2012–present	Incumbent
Political offices
Preceded by Angela Rayner	Shadow Minister for Women and Equalities; 2016–2017	Succeeded by Dawn Butler
