= Frederic Kelley =

British politician

Major Sir Frederic Arthur Kelley, OBE JP (6 May 1863 – 29 May 1926) was a British Unionist Party politician, justice of the peace for the West Riding of Yorkshire, and member of parliament (MP) for Rotherham from 1918 to 1923.

Born in Healey to Ralph and Sarah Ann Kelley of Heckmondwike, Yorkshire, Frederic married Laura Pickles, daughter of Charles Henry Pickles, a dyer and chemical manufacturer, on 5 September 1888. Following several years as a member of Sheffield City Council, Kelley was elected MP for Rotherham at the 1918 general election, a seat he held until 1923, when he was defeated.

Frederic Kelley received an Order of the British Empire (OBE) in 1919 and was knighted in the 1923 Birthday Honours.

He lived his final years in Harrogate and died on 29 May 1926 at age 63.

Parliament of the United Kingdom
Preceded by Arthur Richardson	Member of Parliament for Rotherham; 1918 – 1923	Succeeded by Fred Lindley
