= Sir Arthur Dyke Acland, 13th Baronet =

British Liberal Party politician and political author

The Right Honourable Sir Arthur Acland Bt
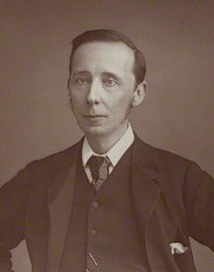

Vice-President of the Committee on Education
- In office 25 August 1892 – 21 June 1895
- Monarch: Victoria
- Prime Minister: William Ewart Gladstone; The Earl of Rosebery
- Preceded by: Sir William Hart Dyke, Bt
- Succeeded by: Sir John Eldon Gorst

Personal details
- Born: 13 October 1847 Holnicote, near Porlock, Somerset, England
- Died: 9 October 1926 (aged 78)
- Party: Liberal
- Spouse: Alice Sophia Cunningham (m. 1873)
- Education: Christ Church, Oxford

Sir Arthur Herbert Dyke Acland, 13th Baronet, PC (13 October 1847 – 9 October 1926) was a British Liberal politician and political author. He is best remembered for his involvement in education, serving as Vice-President of the Council of Education under William Ewart Gladstone and the Earl of Rosebery between 1892 and 1895.

== Background and education ==
Acland was born at Holnicote, near Porlock, Somerset. He was educated at Rugby School and Christ Church, Oxford, and was called to the Bar, Inner Temple, in 1867.

== Early career ==
After graduation, Acland became a lecturer and tutor at Keble College, Oxford. He became a deacon in the Church of England in 1872 and a priest in 1874. He retired from holy orders in 1879 to pursue a political career. He served in various posts at colleges at Oxford from 1877 to 1885, most notably his administration, from 1878 onwards, of the Oxford Extension Lectures, which both furthered his grounding in the education field and brought him into contact with the industrial classes in the North of England, who would become his political base. In 1886, he served as President of the second day of the Co-operative Congress.

In 1879, Acland sat on the committee to create an Oxford women's college "in which no distinction will be made between students on the ground of their belonging to different religious denominations." This resulted in the founding of Somerville Hall (later Somerville College).

== Parliamentary career ==
Though a wealthy aristocrat, Acland became the Liberal candidate for the industrial constituency of Rotherham. The incongruity was increased by the fact that the Yorkshire town was several hundred miles from Acland's home in Devon. Nonetheless, he was easily elected in 1885 and remained Member of Parliament for Rotherham until the end of his political career in 1899.

Acland became one of the principal sponsors of the 1889 Welsh Intermediate Education Act, making the County Councils in Wales responsible for education – a reform not introduced in England until 1902. In 1892, William Ewart Gladstone appointed Acland Vice-President of the Council of Education, with a seat in the cabinet. His cabinet status gave him effective control of the educational authorities (The Council President, Lord Kimberley, was a figurehead). He was sworn of the Privy Council at the same time.

Acland's principal legislative achievements were both enacted in 1893: The Elementary Education (Blind and Deaf Children) Act, and the Elementary Education (School Attendance) Act (which made education compulsory up to the age of eleven). The same year, he promulgated the Evening Continuation School Code, which laid the foundation for adult education, and issued Circular 321, which required inspectors to submit a report to the Education Department about the condition of buildings and apparatus in each public elementary school. Acland's physical and mental health were not equal to the tasks he undertook, and his ill health continued after he left office after the Liberals' defeat in the General Election of 1895. Although re-elected, he effectively resigned from Parliament in 1899 by requesting appointment to the position of Steward of the Manor of Northstead, a nominal office of profit under the Crown.

== Later life and other honours ==
After his retirement, Acland served on several government commissions. In 1908, he declined a peerage. He worked on revised editions of his Handbook in Outline of the Political History of England (co-authored with Cyril Ransome, father of children's author Arthur Ransome), a longtime standard in the field.

Acland School – later merged into Acland Burghley School – in Tufnell Park, London was named after him.

The Acland prizes in Humanities and Languages are awarded annually at Imperial College London, where Acland was a Governor.

There is an Acland Room named after Acland in the Department for Continuing Education, University of Oxford.

== Family ==
Acland married Alice Sophia Cunningham, daughter of Reverend Francis Macaulay Cunningham, in 1873. In 1919, at the age of 71, he succeeded his brother as ninth Baronet of Columb-John of the 1644 creation and thirteenth Baronet of Columb-John of the 1678 creation. He died in October 1926, aged 78, and was succeeded in his titles by his eldest son, Francis.

Parliament of the United Kingdom
New constituency	Member of Parliament for Rotherham; 1885–1899	Succeeded by Sir William Holland
Political offices
Preceded by Sir William Hart Dyke, Bt	Vice-President of the Committee on Education; 1892 – 1895	Succeeded by Sir John Eldon Gorst
Party political offices
Preceded by Augustine Birrell	President of the National Liberal Federation; 1906–1907	Succeeded by William Angus
Baronetage of England
Preceded by Charles Thomas Dyke Acland	Baronet (of Columb-John); 1644 creation 1919 – 1926	Succeeded by Francis Dyke Acland
Preceded by Charles Thomas Dyke Acland	Baronet (of Columb-John); 1678 creation 1919 – 1926	Succeeded by Francis Dyke Acland
