= Jimmy Boyce =

British politician

James Boyce (6 September 1947 – 25 January 1994), known as Jimmy Boyce, was a British Labour politician.

He was a member of Sheffield Council from 1984 and was elected Member of Parliament for Rotherham in April 1992, but died less than 2 years later.

== Personal life ==
James Boyce was born in 1947 in Paisley, Scotland, the son of James and Nellie Boyce. He came to settle in Sheffield, meeting and marrying Patricia Morton, with whom he had two sons, Jimmy and Calum. He was divorced in the late 1980s and remarried in April 1993.

== Career ==
Boyce became involved in local politics through his father in-law, Alf Morton (who introduced him to the local Labour party). Boyce became involved in trade union activities while working in the then thriving steel works in Sheffield but, like many others, was made redundant in the early 1980s. He went on to study law at the then Sheffield Polytechnic but left during his second year. In 1984 he was elected as local councillor for the Burngreave ward in Sheffield. He returned to Sheffield University to study Law in 1987 as a mature student and was a much-loved figure around the Law Department, known for his dry sense of humour and caring personality.

== Health and death ==
On Christmas Eve 1993 he was put on the transplant waiting list for a new heart after what he thought was a respiratory problem after complaining of breathing problems. It turned out he was suffering from an enlarged heart. On Burns Night 1994 he suffered a fatal heart attack at home in his living room. Over 500 people attended his memorial service on 11 February 1994, at which a speaker was the then Labour Party leader John Smith, who, coincidentally, would also die of a heart attack just a week after the by-election to elect Boyce's replacement was held.

Parliament of the United Kingdom
Preceded by Stanley Crowther	Member of Parliament for Rotherham; 1992–1994	Succeeded by Denis MacShane
