= Brian O'Malley =

British politician

Brian O'Malley

Brian Kevin O'Malley (22 January 1930 – 6 April 1976) was a British Labour Party politician.

O'Malley was educated at Mexborough Grammar School and Manchester University. He was a teacher and lecturer and a trade union official. From 1959 to 1961 he taught at the Percy Jackson Grammar School.

O'Malley was elected Member of Parliament for Rotherham in a 1963 by-election. He served as a government whip from 1964 to 1969. He was junior Health and Social Security Minister from 1969 to 1970, and became Minister of State for that department in 1974.

O'Malley's crowning achievement was obtaining cross-party support for a new State pension scheme (after two aborted attempts by previous governments) and steering through Parliament the bill to implement what became the State Earnings Related Pension Scheme (SERPS). While the Secretary of State Barbara Castle took public credit for it, O'Malley was responsible for its substance.

O'Malley's career was cut short by his death in 1976 at the age of 46, following complications after brain surgery. Stanley Crowther was elected as his successor in the subsequent by-election.

Parliament of the United Kingdom
Preceded by Jack Jones	Member of Parliament for Rotherham; 1963–1976	Succeeded by Stanley Crowther
