= 2012 Rotherham by-election =

2012 UK Parliamentary by-election

- 29 November 2012

Rotherham
- Turnout: 33.6%
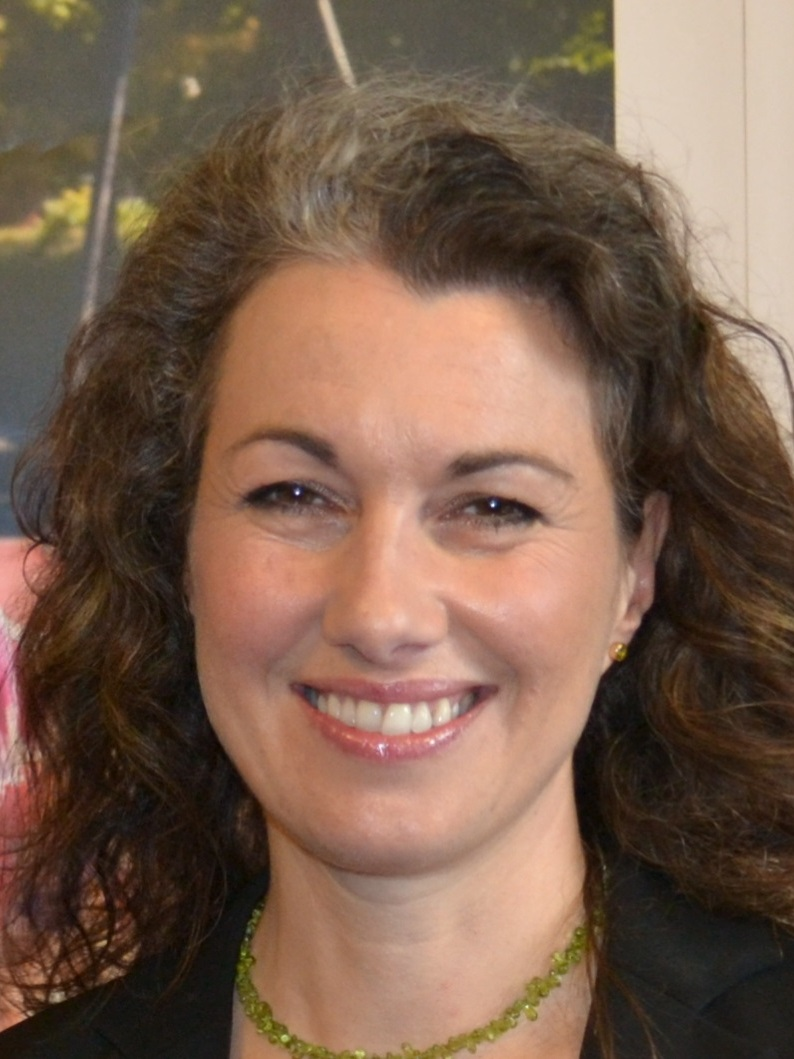

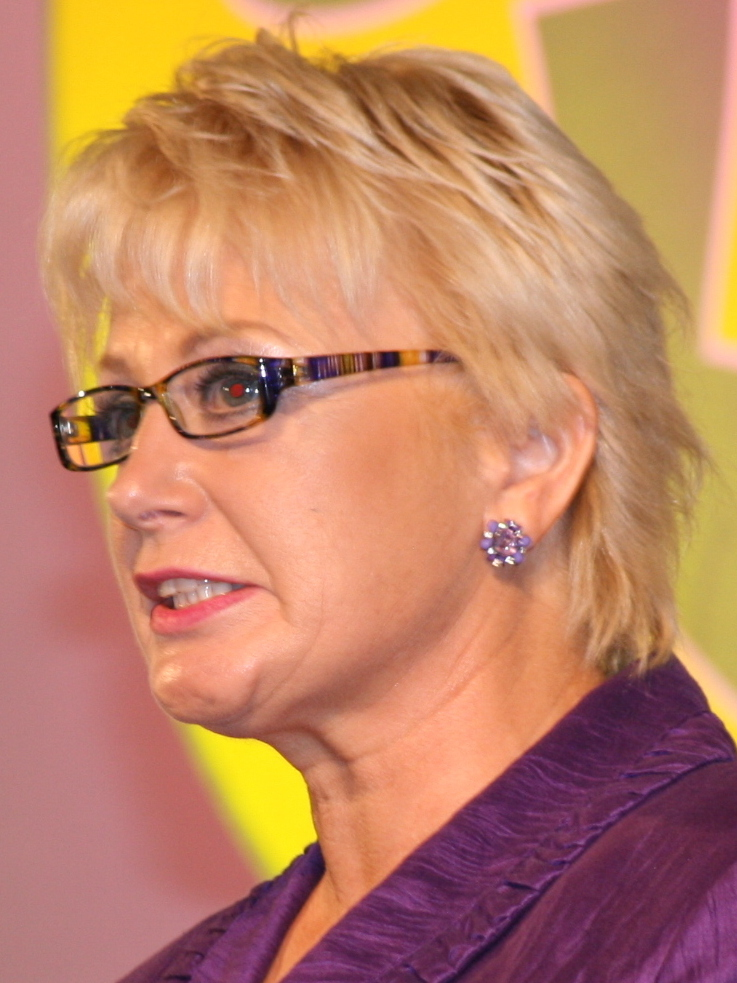

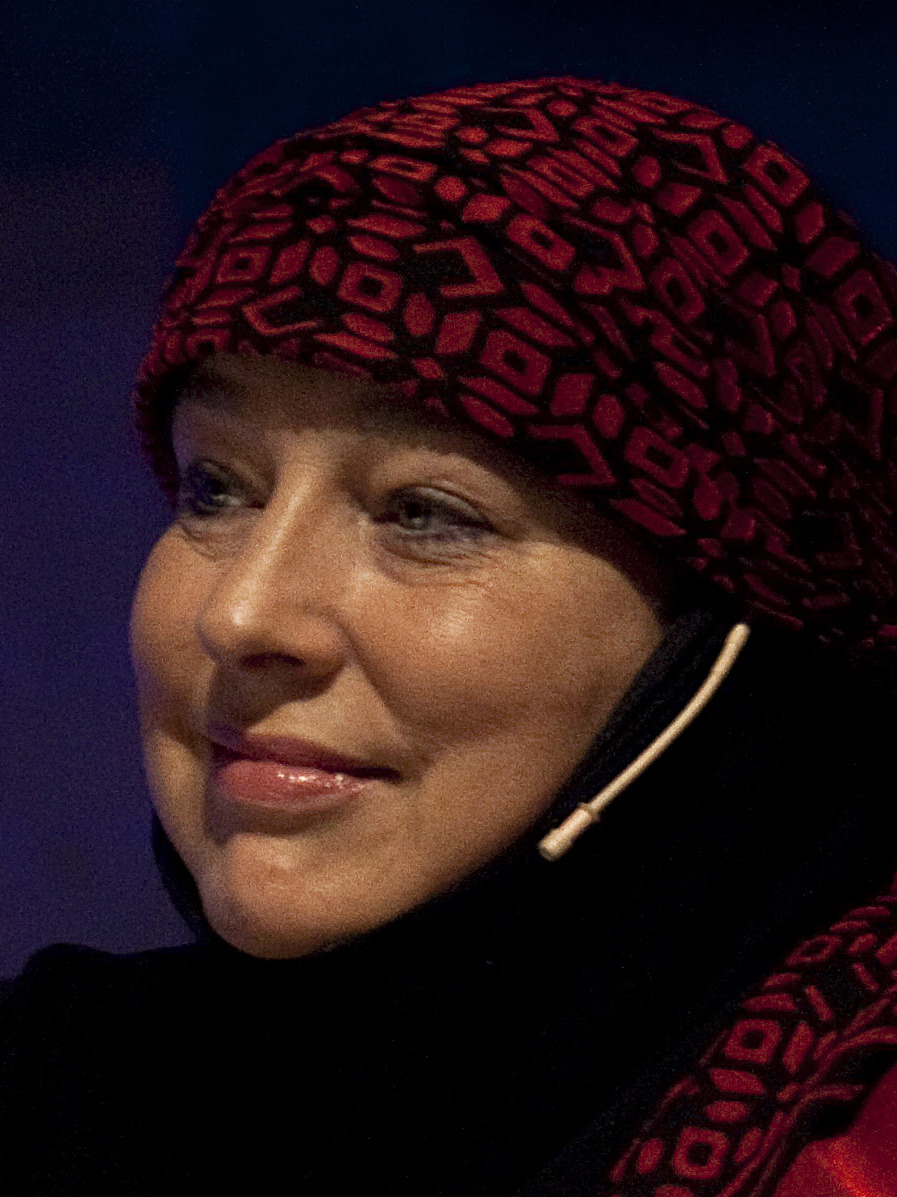
	First party	Second party	Third party
			BNP
Candidate	Sarah Champion	Jane Collins	Marlene Guest
Party	Labour	UKIP	BNP
Popular vote	9,966	4,648	1,804
Percentage	46.3%	21.8%	8.5%
Swing	▲1.7 pp	▲15.9 pp	▼1.9 pp
	Fourth party	Fifth party
		Con
Candidate	Yvonne Ridley	Simon Wilson
Party	Respect	Conservative
Popular vote	1,778	1,157
Percentage	8.3%	5.4%
Swing	New party	▼11.3 pp
MP before election
Denis MacShane
Labour
Subsequent MP
Sarah Champion
Labour

A by-election for the United Kingdom parliamentary constituency of Rotherham was held on 29 November 2012, caused by the resignation of incumbent Labour Party member of Parliament (MP) Denis MacShane after the House of Commons Standards and Privileges Committee found him guilty of offences during the 2009 MPs' expenses scandal. It was won by Sarah Champion of Labour, who held the seat for the party.

The election took place on the same day as by-elections in Croydon North and Middlesbrough, which were caused by the deaths of the sitting MPs.

== Background and candidates ==
Sitting Labour Party member of Parliament Denis MacShane resigned after House of Commons Standards and Privileges Committee found that he had submitted 19 false invoices "plainly intended to deceive" the parliamentary expenses authority, an issue dating back to 2009 and a wider parliamentary expenses scandal in the UK. MacShane accepted the office of Chiltern Hundreds on 5 November 2012, formally vacating his seat.

Rotherham Borough Council released the statement of persons nominated on 14 November 2012, confirming 11 candidates for the by-election.

The Liberal Democrats' candidate, Michael Beckett, was announced by BBC Look North on 13 November 2012. The Labour candidate Sarah Champion is chief executive of Bluebell Wood Children's Hospice in Rotherham. Ex-miner Ralph Dyson was confirmed as the candidate for the Trade Unionist and Socialist Coalition on 9 November 2011.

Clint Bristow stood with no party description, but is a local organiser for the English Defence League.

Local resident Jane Collins was the candidate for UKIP, who previously stood for the party in the 2011 Barnsley by-election where she achieved second place with 12.2% of the vote, beating both the Conservatives and Liberal Democrats. Marlene Guest had stood for the BNP in Rotherham previously.

Respect confirmed their selection of Yvonne Ridley on 12 November. Ms Ridley is a broadcaster, known for being kidnapped by Taliban forces while she was working in Afghanistan for the Sunday Express newspaper. Subsequent to being freed, she converted to Islam and has adopted a strong anti-Zionist position, saying "any Zionism in Respect would be hunted down and kicked out".

English Democrats candidate David Wildgoose stood in the 1994 Rotherham by-election as a Liberal Democrat when Denis MacShane was first elected, coming second with nearly 30% of the vote. At the previous General Election, he stood for the English Democrats in Sheffield Hallam against the Liberal Democrat leader Nick Clegg.

Simon Copley, a charity fundraiser and church leader, stood as an independent candidate saying he offered a "moderate alternative".

== Campaign ==
During the election campaign, social workers removed three children from foster care on behalf of the local council on the grounds that the foster parents were members of UKIP. The local council said that the children were "not indigenous white British" and that they had concerns about UKIP's stance on immigration. The decision attracted widespread criticism from across the political spectrum, including from the Labour leader Ed Miliband and Conservative Secretary of State for Education Michael Gove. The Labour Leader of Rotherham Council has also launched an inquiry. Leader of UKIP, Nigel Farage said that he was "appalled and upset" by the decision. He said that his party is officially constituted as a non-racist, non-sectarian, libertarian party, as defined in the party constitution. In May 2013, Rotherham council apologised and said that communication about the decision gave the incorrect impression that it related solely to the couples UKIP membership. This was incorrect, the children were removed because it was in their "best interests" though full details couldn't be given "for legal reasons". The council said it had "taken action to strengthen the way it made decisions and how it communicated information."

== Result ==
Labour won the by-election. The result was poor for the two parties of the governing coalition with the Conservatives dropping to fifth place, while the Liberal Democrats were in eighth place, described as the worst ever performance by a major party in a by-election, although not the lowest vote share.

UKIP finished in second place. Their candidate Jane Collins had previously been the only UKIP candidate to come second in any UK parliamentary election at Barnsley Central in 2011. UKIP also came second in the Middlesbrough by-election held on the same day as Rotherham. The UKIP vote share was, at 21.7%, the highest ever recorded for that party in any parliamentary election (however they had polled more votes in both the Corby by-election and in Buckingham at the 2010 general election, and their record for highest share was broken at Eastleigh three months later).

The British National Party's third place was the highest ever placing for that party in a by-election, although they had polled more votes and a higher share elsewhere. Additionally the BNP result represented a decline in their vote from the 2010 general election, in what had been one of their strongest performances that year. To date, this by-election marked the final time the BNP reached the 5% threshold required to keep their deposit. For Respect, Yvonne Ridley obtained the party's third best by-election result, surpassed only by her own performance in Leicester South in 2004 (fourth with 12.7%), and George Galloway's gain of Bradford West in March 2012.

2012 Rotherham by-election
Party	Candidate	Votes	%	±%
Labour	Sarah Champion	9,966	46.3	▲1.7
UKIP	Jane Collins	4,648	21.8	▲15.9
BNP	Marlene Guest	1,804	8.5	▼1.9
Respect	Yvonne Ridley	1,778	8.3	N/A
Conservative	Simon Wilson	1,157	5.4	▼11.3
English Democrat	David Wildgoose	703	3.3	N/A
Independent	Simon Copley	582	2.7	N/A
Liberal Democrats	Michael Beckett	451	2.1	▼13.9
TUSC	Ralph Dyson	261	1.2	N/A
Independent	Paul Dickson	51	0.2	N/A
no description	Clint Bristow	29	0.1	N/A
Majority		5,318	24.5	▼3.4
Turnout		21,430	33.63	▼25.37
Labour hold		Swing	▼7.1	

== Previous result ==
General election 2010: Rotherham
Party	Candidate	Votes	%	±%
Labour	Denis MacShane	16,741	44.6	▼13.1
Conservative	Jackie Whiteley	6,279	16.7	▲3.4
Liberal Democrats	Rebecca Taylor	5,994	16.0	▼0.4
BNP	Marlene Guest	3,906	10.4	▲4.5
Independent	Peter Thirlwall	2,366	6.3	N/A
UKIP	Caven Vines	2,220	5.9	▲2.0
Majority		10,462	27.9	▼7.7
Turnout		37,506	59.0	▲4.9
Labour hold		Swing	▼8.3	

== See also ==
- 1994 Rotherham by-election
- 1976 Rotherham by-election
- 1910 Rotherham by-election
- 1899 Rotherham by-election
- List of United Kingdom by-elections
- Opinion polling for the 2015 United Kingdom general election
