= Arthur Richardson (politician) =

English merchant and politician

Arthur Richardson, c. 1905

Arthur Richardson (5 February 1860 – 27 June 1936) was an English merchant and Liberal–Labour politician from Nottinghamshire. He sat in the House of Commons from 1906 to 1918.

== Schooling ==
Richardson was born in East Bridgford, Nottinghamshire, the son of William Richardson. He was educated at East Bridgford National School and then at Magnus Grammar School in Newark-on-Trent. He later became a tea merchant in the firm of Arthur Richardson and Sons.

== Politics ==
Richardson was elected at the 1906 general election as the Member of Parliament (MP) for Nottingham South, defeating the sitting Unionist MP Lord Henry Cavendish-Bentinck. Although described as Liberal–Labour, he was not a trade union-sponsored MP, and as such not required to join the Labour Party in 1910.

Richardson held the seat until the January 1910 election, when he was defeated by Cavendish-Bentinck. He was unsuccessful when he stood again in December 1910. He returned to Parliament of the United Kingdom seven years later, when he was elected unopposed as MP for Rotherham at a by-election in February 1917 after the Liberal MP Jack Pease was elevated to the peerage. He held that seat until the 1918 general election, when he stood unsuccessfully as a Liberal Party candidate in Nottingham West. He then contested the next three general elections in the Melton division of Leicestershire. After a clear defeat by the sitting Conservative Party MP Sir Charles Yate in 1922, he lost to Yate by only 44 votes in 1923, but by over 5,000 votes in 1924.

Arthur Richardson died on 27 June 1936 aged 76 in Edwalton, Nottingham.

Parliament of the United Kingdom
Preceded by Lord Henry Cavendish-Bentinck	Member of Parliament for Nottingham South; 1906–January 1910	Succeeded by Lord Henry Cavendish-Bentinck
Preceded by Jack Pease	Member of Parliament for Rotherham; 1917–1918	Succeeded by Frederic Kelley
