= 1963 Rotherham by-election =

UK parliamentary by-election

The 1963 Rotherham by-election was held on 28 March 1963 after the death of the Labour MP John Henry Jones in a road accident. It was won by the Labour candidate Brian O'Malley.

A total of 493 people serving in the Armed Forces applied for nomination papers to stand in the election, to avail of the automatic military discharge for Parliamentary candidates publicised by Malcolm Thompson at the 1962 Middlesbrough West by-election. Whereas Thompson's name had appeared on the ballot paper, by 1963 it was widely known that merely applying for papers sufficed for a discharge, without needing to submit the papers or pay an electoral deposit. Rotherham was the last election before the military rules for election discharge were tightened.

== Result ==
Rotherham by-election, 1963: Rotherham
| Party | Candidate | Votes | % | ±% |
|---|---|---|---|---|
| Labour | Brian O'Malley | 22,411 | 69.2 | +6.4 |
| Conservative | John Michael Barrass | 9,209 | 28.5 | −8.7 |
| Independent | Russell Ernest Eckley | 742 | 2.3 | New |
| Majority | | 13,202 | 40.7 | +15.1 |
| Turnout | | 32,362 | | |
| Labour hold | | Swing | | |
