= Fred Lindley =

British Labour MP (1878-????)

Member of Parliament for Rotherham
- In office 1923–1931

Personal details
- Born: 6 May 1878
- Died: unknown
- Party: Labour

Fred William Lindley (born 6 May 1878) was an English carpenter, trade unionist, and Labour Party politician, sitting as MP for Rotherham from 1923 to 1931.

== Early life ==
Lindley was born in 1878 in Parkgate near Rotherham, and went to school in Rotherham and Sheffield.

== Politics ==
Lindley helped found the Rotherham branch of the Independent Labour Party and the Sheffield Labour Representation Committee. He was elected at the 1923 general election as the Member of Parliament (MP) for Rotherham, defeating the sitting Conservative MP Frederic Arthur Kelley. Lindley held the seat until his defeat at the 1931 general election by the Conservative George Herbert.

== Work ==
Lindley briefly clerked for a pawnbroker, but became an apprentice joiner in 1895. He was a trade unionist with the Amalgamated Society of Carpenters and Joiners from the age of 21, when he also joined the Independent Labour Party (ILP), serving on the union's national executive and as organiser of the Sheffield, Rotherham, and Barnsley district.

Parliament of the United Kingdom
Preceded by Frederic Kelley	Member of Parliament for Rotherham; 1923 – 1931	Succeeded by George Herbert
