= William Holland, 1st Baron Rotherham =

British politician

William Holland

William Henry Holland, 1st Baron Rotherham (15 December 1849 – 26 December 1927) was a British industrialist and Liberal politician.

== Biography ==
William Holland was born on 15 December 1849, the second son of William Holland, a cotton spinner of Higher Broughton, near Manchester. In 1872 he became a partner in the family business Messrs William Holland and Sons. He became prominent in the industry, becoming chairman or president of the Fine Cotton Spinners and Doublers Association, the Textile Institute, the Machinery Users' Association and the Manchester Chamber of Commerce.

He became involved in liberal politics, and for ten years was an alderman on Manchester City Council. In the 1892 general election he stood as Member of Parliament for Salford North, winning the seat from the Conservatives by a narrow majority. In the 1895 general election the situation was reversed, when he lost the seat by six votes to the Conservative candidate, Frederick Platt-Higgins.

Holland returned to the Commons in 1899, when he won a by-election at Rotherham caused by the resignation of Arthur Acland. He was knighted in the 1902 Coronation Honours, receiving the accolade from King Edward VII at Buckingham Palace on 24 October that year, and made a baronet, of Queen's Gate in the Royal Borough of Kensington in 1907. He was a member of a number of parliamentary and other governmental committees including the Indian Currency Committee, the Advisory Committee on Commercial Intelligence and the Committee on Joint Stock Companies. From 1908 to 1910 he was acting Chairman of Ways and Means. He was also a commissioner for the international exhibitions held in Paris in 1900, Milan in 1906 and Brussels in 1910.

He retained the Rotherham seat at successive general elections, up to and including that held in January 1910. However, he chose to step down from parliament in February 1910 to allow J A Pease, who had lost his seat at Saffron Walden, to be returned to parliament at a by-election.

In July 1910 Holland was raised to the Peerage of the United Kingdom as Baron Rotherham of Broughton, in the County of Lancaster. He also received the freedom of the Borough of Rotherham.

He had disposed of William Holland and Sons in 1898, and with the moneys received had made a number of unwise investments in Chinese mines and railways and Japanese bonds. In 1917 Lord Rotherham became insolvent, and was forced to make a settlement with his creditors.

== Personal life ==
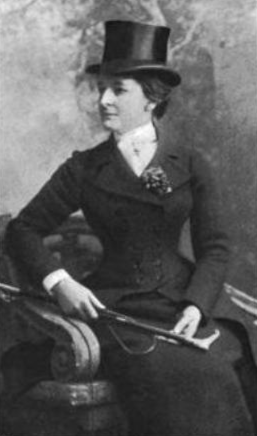
Mary Lund

William Holland married Mary Lund in 1874, and they had one son; Stuart Lund Holland, born in 1876. His wife converted to Roman Catholicism in 1905, and he followed suit in 1922.

Lord Rotherham died at his residence in Rottingdean, Sussex in December 1927, aged 78.

Parliament of the United Kingdom
| Preceded by Edward Hardcastle | Member of Parliament for Salford North; 1892 – 1895 | Succeeded by Frederick Platt-Higgins |
| Preceded by Arthur Herbert Dyke Acland | Member of Parliament for Rotherham; 1899 – March 1910 | Succeeded by J A Pease |
Peerage of the United Kingdom
| New creation | Baron Rotherham; 1910 – 1927 | Succeeded by Stuart Holland |
Baronetage of the United Kingdom
| New creation | Baronet (of Broughton); 1907 – 1927 | Succeeded by Stuart Holland |
