= George Herbert (politician) =

British politician

George Herbert (23 January 1892 – 16 June 1982) was a British Conservative Party politician. He was elected as the Member of Parliament (MP) for Rotherham at the 1931 general election, and resigned on 6 February 1933 by appointment as Steward of the Chiltern Hundreds.

Parliament of the United Kingdom
Preceded by Fred Lindley	Member of Parliament for Rotherham; 1931–1933	Succeeded by William Dobbie
