= Jack Jones (Rotherham MP) =

British politician (1894-1962)

John Henry Jones (26 October 1894 – 31 October 1962) was a British Labour Party politician.

== Early life ==
He was born in Rotherham, attending Port Talbot School, and attended Bangor University.

== Career ==
A steel smelter by trade, he served during World War I in the Middle East with the East Riding of Yorkshire Yeomanry.

Jones was Parliamentary private secretary to Lord Pakenham while he was Chancellor of the Duchy of Lancaster, and to the Under-Secretary for Foreign Affairs Christopher Mayhew from May to October 1947. He was a joint Parliamentary Secretary to the Ministry of Supply from October 1947 to 1950.

Jones was elected at the 1945 general election as a member of parliament (MP) for Bolton, and held the seat until the constituency abolished in 1950. He was then elected as MP for Rotherham at the 1950 general election, and held the seat until his death.

== Personal life ==
He lived in Culcheth in Cheshire.

He was killed in a road accident on Halloween of 1962. He was killed when driving back to Culcheth over Woodhead Pass, on the A628 road; it is thought that the car skidded on ice around 11pm; over a 100ft ravine, the car somersaulted. He was thrown from the car, but his 48 year old wife survived the accident.

Parliament of the United Kingdom
Preceded by Sir Edward Cadogan and Sir Cyril Entwistle	Member of Parliament for Bolton; 1945–1950; With: John Lewis	Constituency abolished
Preceded by William Dobbie	Member of Parliament for Rotherham; 1950–1962	Succeeded by Brian O'Malley
