= 1910 Rotherham by-election =

UK parliamentary by-election

The 1910 Rotherham by-election was a parliamentary by-election held for the UK House of Commons constituency of Rotherham in what was then the West Riding of Yorkshire on 1 March 1910.

== Vacancy ==
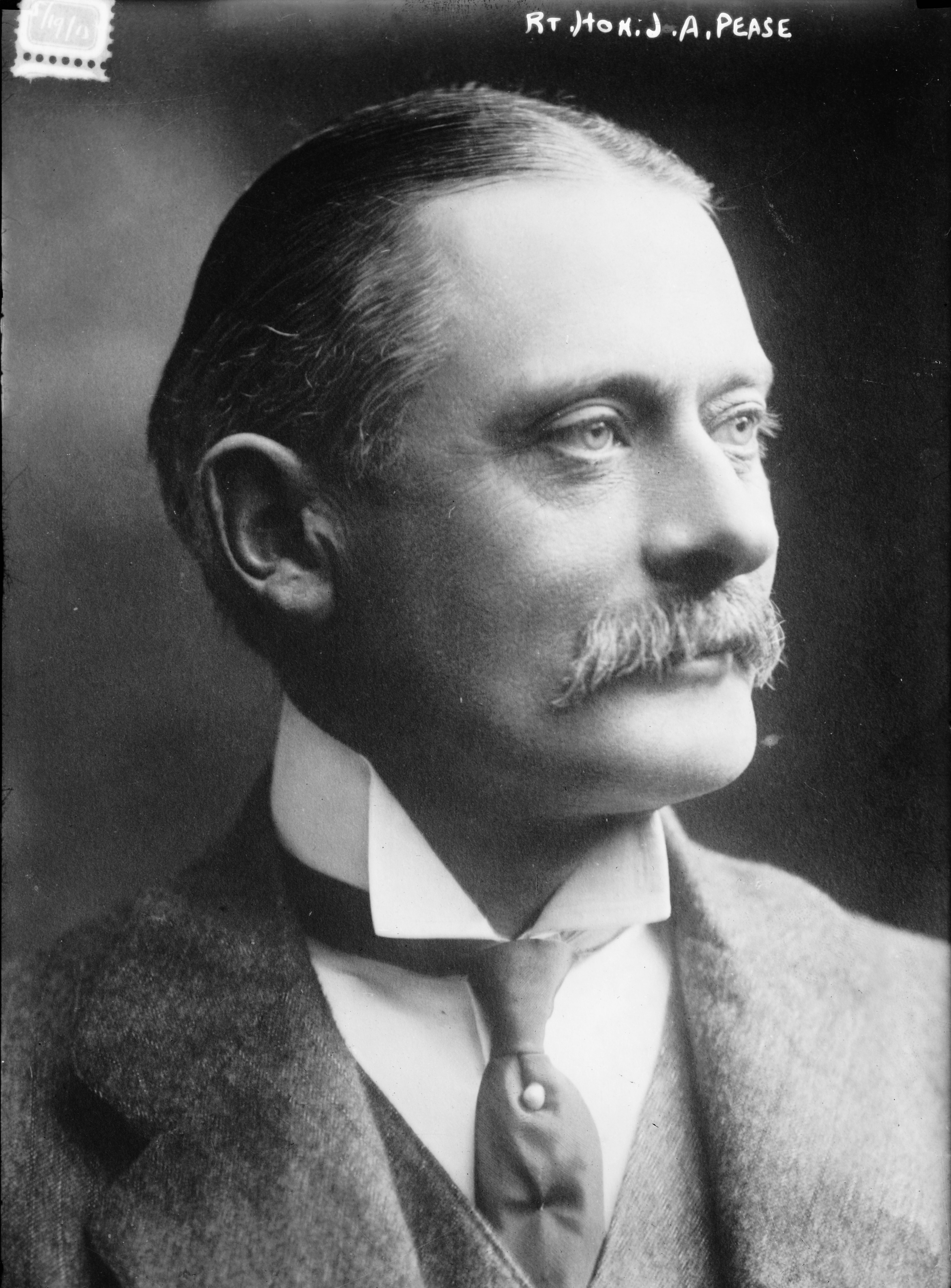
Jack Pease

The by-election was caused by the resignation of the sitting Liberal MP, Sir William Holland.

Holland, who held his seat in Rotherham with a majority of 7,558 agreed to resign to make way for J A Pease to return to Parliament. Pease had been government Chief Whip but had lost his seat at Saffron Walden in the general election of January 1910. The Prime Minister, H H Asquith, had intended to appoint Pease to the Cabinet as Chancellor of the Duchy of Lancaster and was therefore keen to identify a seat at which room could be made for Pease at a by-election. Asquith had taken Pease’s defeat quite hard and had sent him a telegram on 12 January 1910 saying: ‘This is the worst incident of the election and grieves me more than I can say...’

In return for his resignation Holland was rewarded with a peerage in the King’s birthday honours list in June 1910.

== Candidates ==
=== Liberals ===
Pease addressed a meeting of the Rotherham Liberal Federation on 21 February and they agreed to support his candidature. The meeting heard from Sir William Holland that he had been asked by the Prime Minister to stand aside in favour of Pease and he read a letter from Asquith urging that Pease be returned to his Parliamentary duties as soon as possible.

=== Conservatives ===
Although Holland had been MP for Rotherham since 1899 and had been unopposed in 1906, the Unionists had put up a candidate against him in January 1910. However the Conservatives were apparently faced with the difficulty of raising the necessary funds to fight a by-election so soon after the general election but they indicated they would put up a candidate if the Labour Party made it a three-cornered contest.

=== Labour ===
The local Labour Party was apparently very keen to stand a candidate. At a meeting of the Trades Council on 22 February a resolution in favour of running a candidate was passed. The name of John Thomas Macpherson, the former Labour MP for Preston was discussed. Macpherson was an official of the British Steel Smelters, Mill, Iron, Tinplate and Kindred Trades Association and the union was said to be strong in the Rotherham constituency and willing to pay for his deposit and other expenses. The strongest local trade union however was the Yorkshire Miners' Association and the officials of the Federation were traditionally supporters of the Liberals. Although the local Labour Party had decided to recommend a candidate be adopted, many moderate members of the party, who had traditionally been prepared to vote Liberal, were urging that Pease be unopposed. It was proposed that a deputation of Labour people meet with the executive of the Yorkshire Miners’ Federation at Barnsley to see if a miners’ candidate could be found. In the end the pro-Liberal voices prevailed and another strong factor was the influence of Ramsay MacDonald who argued against putting a candidate up because the time available for the campaign was so short, although recommending the time be used to organise in the constituency in support of a candidate against all-comers at the next general election.

== Result ==
There being no other candidates putting themselves forward, Pease was returned unopposed.

Rotherham by-election, 1910
Party	Candidate	Votes	%	±%
Liberal	Jack Pease	Unopposed	N/A	N/A
Liberal hold				

== Rotherham by-elections ==
- 1899, 76, 94, 2012 Rotherham by-election

== See also ==
- List of United Kingdom by-elections
- United Kingdom by-election records
