= Stuart Holland, 2nd Baron Rotherham =

Stuart Lund Holland, 2nd Baron Rotherham (25 October 1876 – 24 January 1950) was a British Army officer and politician.

== Career ==
Holland was born on 25 October 1876, the son of industrialist and Liberal politician William Henry Holland and Mary Lund. His father was in 1910 created Baron Rotherham, when young Stuart received the prefix the Honourable.

He was educated at Harrow School and Exeter College, Oxford.

Holland was commissioned into the British Army as a second lieutenant in the 6th (Inniskilling) Dragoons on 23 May 1900, and joined his regiment in South Africa, where they took part in the Second Boer War. He was promoted lieutenant on 10 July 1901, and stayed in South Africa throughout the war, which ended with the Peace of Vereeniging on 31 May 1902. Following the end of the war, he left Cape Town with other men of his regiment on the SS Orissa, which arrived at Southampton in late October 1902, and was then stationed at Curragh. He gained the rank of captain in 1906, and later fought in the First World War between 1914 and 1919. He was Assistant Administrator, Ministry of Munitions between 1920 and 1921, and Inspector, Ministry of Pensions in 1922.

He succeeded as 2nd Baron Rotherham, of Broughton, co. Lancaster, on his father's death on 26 December 1927.

Holland married on 25 October 1909 Miriam Agnes Wright. He died on 24 January 1950 at age 73. On his death, his titles became extinct.

Peerage of the United Kingdom
Preceded by William Holland	Baron Rotherham; 1927–1950	Extinct
