= Jack Pease, 1st Baron Gainford =

British politician

The Right Honourable The Lord Gainford PC DL JP
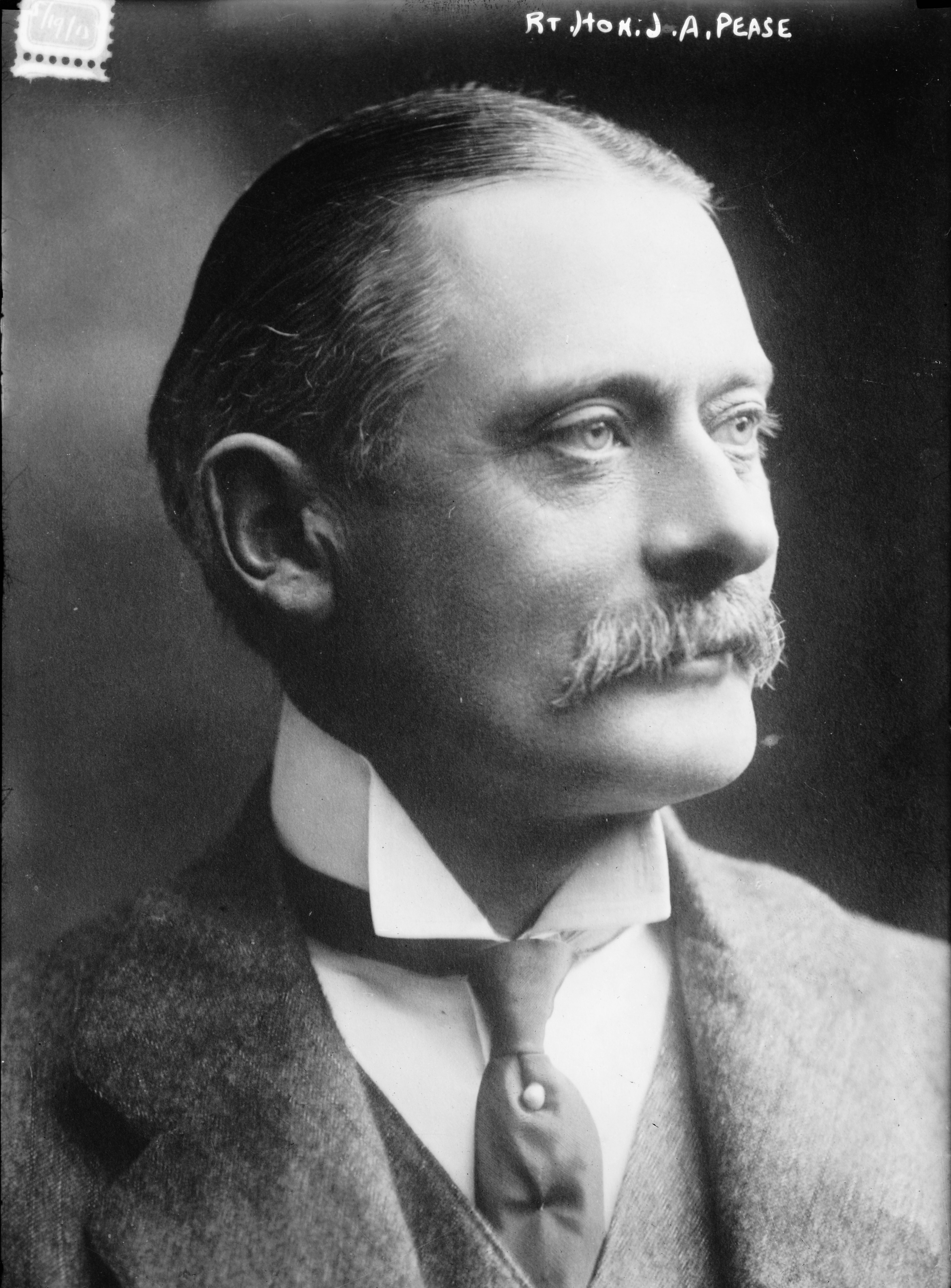

Chairman of the British Broadcasting Company
- In office 18 December 1922 – 31 December 1926
- Preceded by: Office created
- Succeeded by: George Villiers

Postmaster General
- In office 18 January 1916 – 5 December 1916
- Prime Minister: H. H. Asquith
- Preceded by: Herbert Samuel
- Succeeded by: Albert Illingworth

President of the Board of Education
- In office 23 October 1911 – 25 May 1915
- Prime Minister: H. H. Asquith
- Preceded by: Walter Runciman
- Succeeded by: Arthur Henderson

Chancellor of the Duchy of Lancaster
- In office 14 February 1910 – 23 October 1911
- Prime Minister: H. H. Asquith
- Preceded by: Herbert Samuel
- Succeeded by: Charles Hobhouse

Government Chief Whip in the House of Commons; Parliamentary Secretary to the Treasury
- In office 3 June 1908 – 15 January 1910
- Prime Minister: H. H. Asquith
- Preceded by: George Whiteley
- Succeeded by: The Master of Elibank

Lords Commissioner of the Treasury
- In office 18 December 1905 – 3 June 1908
- Prime Minister: Henry Campbell-Bannerman; H. H. Asquith

Member of Parliament for Rotherham
- In office 1 March 1910 – 23 January 1917
- Preceded by: William Holland
- Succeeded by: Arthur Richardson

Member of Parliament for Saffron Walden
- In office 31 May 1901 – 15 January 1910
- Preceded by: Armine Wodehouse
- Succeeded by: Douglas Proby

Member of Parliament for Tyneside
- In office 26 July 1892 – 24 October 1900
- Preceded by: Wentworth Beaumont
- Succeeded by: Hugh Crawford Smith

Personal details
- Born: Joseph Albert Pease; 17 January 1860 Darlington, County Durham
- Died: 15 February 1943 (aged 83) Headlam Hall, Gainford, County Durham
- Party: Liberal
- Spouse: Ethel Havelock-Allen (d. 1941)
- Education: Grove House School
- Alma mater: Trinity College, Cambridge

Joseph Albert Pease, 1st Baron Gainford PC DL JP (17 January 1860 – 15 February 1943), known as Jack Pease, was a British businessman and Liberal politician. He was a member of H. H. Asquith's Liberal cabinet between 1910 and 1916 and also served as Chairman of the BBC between 1922 and 1926.

During the course of his political career, Pease supported various progressive measures such as old age pensions and improvements in the pay of agricultural labourers.

== Background and education ==
Pease was born in Darlington, County Durham (a member of the Darlington Peases), the second and youngest son of Sir Joseph Pease, 1st Baronet, of Hutton Hall, Guisborough, and Mary, daughter of Alfred Fox. He was the younger brother of Sir Alfred Pease, 2nd Baronet, the nephew of Arthur Pease and the first cousin of Sir Arthur Pease, 1st Baronet, and Herbert Pease, 1st Baron Daryngton. He was educated at Grove House School, a Quaker school, and at Trinity College, Cambridge.

== Political career ==
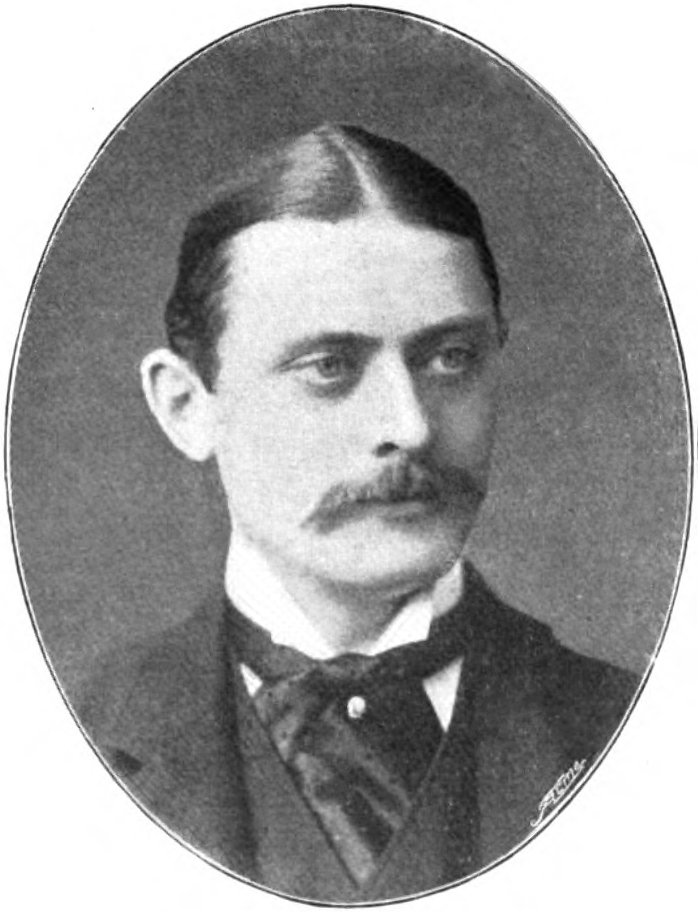
Pease in 1895

Pease served as Mayor of Darlington from 1889 to 1890. He was elected Member of Parliament for Tyneside in 1892, a seat he held until 1900. He contested and won a by-election for Saffron Walden in May 1901, and represented that constituency until 1910, and Rotherham between 1910 and 1916. He was private secretary (unpaid) to John Morley, the Chief Secretary for Ireland, between 1893 and 1895 and a junior opposition whip between 1897 and 1905.

When the Liberals came to power in 1905 under Henry Campbell-Bannerman, Pease was appointed a Junior Lord of the Treasury (government whip). After H. H. Asquith became Prime Minister in 1908 he was promoted to Parliamentary Secretary to the Treasury (Chief Whip) and sworn of the Privy Council. In 1910 he entered Asquith's cabinet as Chancellor of the Duchy of Lancaster, a post he held until 1911, and then served under Asquith as President of the Board of Education between 1911 and 1915 and as Postmaster-General in 1916. In 1917 he was raised to the peerage as Baron Gainford, of Headlam in the County of Durham.

He served on the Claims Commission in France in 1915 and between 1917 and 1920 and in Italy between 1918 and 1919 and was also a Deputy Lieutenant of County Durham and a Justice of the Peace for County Durham and the North Riding of Yorkshire.

== Business career ==
Apart from his political career Pease was Deputy Chairman of the Durham Coal Owners Association and vice-chairman of the Durham District Board (under the Coal Mines Act 1930), a director of Pease and Partners Ltd and other colliery companies, Chairman of Durham Coke Owners, director of the County of London Electric Supply Company, Chairman of South London Electric Supply Corporation, of the Tees Fishery Board, and of the Trustees of the Bowes Museum.

In 1922 he was appointed Chairman of the British Broadcasting Company Ltd, a post he held until its dissolution and replacement by the British Broadcasting Corporation (BBC) on 31 December 1926, and was vice-chairman of the Board of Governors of the BBC until 1932. From 1927 to 1928 he was President of Federation of British Industry.

== Papers ==
Lord Gainford's papers are deposited in Nuffield College, Oxford and consist of diaries, scrap books, press cuttings, correspondence, domestic papers, political papers, official papers, claims commission papers and BBC papers. The main part of the Pease diaries cover the years 1908–1915 and a volume dealing with the years 1908–1910 have been published by Cameron Hazlehurst and Christine Woodland as A Liberal Chronicle: Journals and Papers of J A Pease, 1908–1910; The Historians Press, London, 1994.

== Family ==
Lord Gainford married Ethel, daughter of Sir Henry Havelock-Allan, 1st Baronet, in 1886. They had one son, Joseph, and two daughters, Miriam and Faith (who married Michael Wentworth Beaumont and was the mother of Lord Beaumont of Whitley). Lady Gainford died in October 1941. Lord Gainford survived her by two years and died in February 1943, aged 83. He was succeeded in the barony by his son, Joseph. The family seat was Headlam Hall, Co Durham.

== Arms ==
Coat of arms of Jack Pease, 1st Baron Gainford
Crest Upon the capital of an Ionic column a dove rising holding in the beak a pea stalk as in the arms all Proper. Escutcheon Per fess Azure and Gules a fess nebuly Ermine between two lambs passant in chief Argent and in base upon a mount Proper a dove rising Argent holding in the beak a pea stalk the blossoms and pods also Proper. Supporters On either side a barbary wild sheep ram guardant Or. Motto Pax Et Spes

== See also ==
- List of political families in the United Kingdom

Parliament of the United Kingdom
Preceded by Wentworth Beaumont	Member of Parliament for Tyneside; 1892–1900	Succeeded by Hugh Crawford Smith
Preceded by Hon. Armine Wodehouse	Member of Parliament for Saffron Walden; 1901 – January 1910	Succeeded by Douglas Proby
Preceded by William Holland	Member of Parliament for Rotherham; March 1910 – 1917	Succeeded by Arthur Richardson
Political offices
Preceded by Henry Forster; Lord Balniel; Lord Edmund Talbot	Lord of the Treasury; 1905–1908; With: Herbert Lewis 1905–1908; Freeman Freeman-Thomas 1905–1906; Cecil Norton 1905–1908; John Fuller 1906–1907; John Henry Whitley 1907–1908	Succeeded by Herbert Lewis; Cecil Norton; John Henry Whitley
Preceded by George Whiteley	Government Chief Whip in the House of Commons; Parliamentary Secretary to the Treasury; 1908–1910	Succeeded by The Master of Elibank
Preceded by Herbert Samuel	Chancellor of the Duchy of Lancaster; 1910–1911	Succeeded by Charles Hobhouse
Preceded by Walter Runciman	President of the Board of Education; 1911–1915	Succeeded by Arthur Henderson
Preceded by Herbert Samuel	Postmaster-General; 1916	Succeeded by Albert Illingworth
Party political offices
Preceded by George Whiteley	Liberal Chief Whip; 1908–1910	Succeeded by Alexander Murray
Honorary titles
New office	Chairman of the British Broadcasting Company; 1922–1926	Succeeded by The Earl of Clarendon
Peerage of the United Kingdom
New creation	Baron Gainford; 1917–1943	Succeeded by Joseph Pease
