= Stanley Crowther =

British politician

Member of Parliament for Rotherham
- In office 24 June 1976 – 16 March 1992
- Preceded by: Brian O'Malley
- Succeeded by: Jimmy Boyce

Personal details
- Born: 30 May 1925
- Died: 10 March 2013 (aged 87)
- Political party: Labour

Joseph Stanley Crowther, known as Stan Crowther, (30 May 1925 – 10 March 2013) was a British Labour Party member of parliament for Rotherham from a 1976 by-election until his retirement in 1992. His successor was Jimmy Boyce.

Born in Rotherham in 1925 Stan Crowther held many roles in his lifetime and was known affectionately as Mr Rotherham. He was a dedicated local servant and devoted to his home town being a heritage and environmental campaigner for many years. He died age 87 in 2013.

His roles included being MP for Rotherham between 1976 & 1992.

Mayor of Rotherham twice 1971/72 & 1975/76 as well as being a local councilor for 16 years.

Chairman of Rotherham District Civic Society for more than 20 years having been a founder member in 1968.

Given the Freedom of Rotherham Borough in 2009.

Stan was educated at Rotherham Grammar School and Rotherham College of Technology and served with the Royal Signals from 1943 to1947.

He then became a journalist with the Rotherham Advertiser & also with the Yorkshire Evening Post,

== Other sources ==
- The Times Guide to the House of Commons, Times Newspapers Ltd, 1987

Parliament of the United Kingdom
Preceded by Brian O'Malley	Member of Parliament for Rotherham; 1976–1992	Succeeded by James Boyce
