= Jane Collins =

British politician (born 1962)

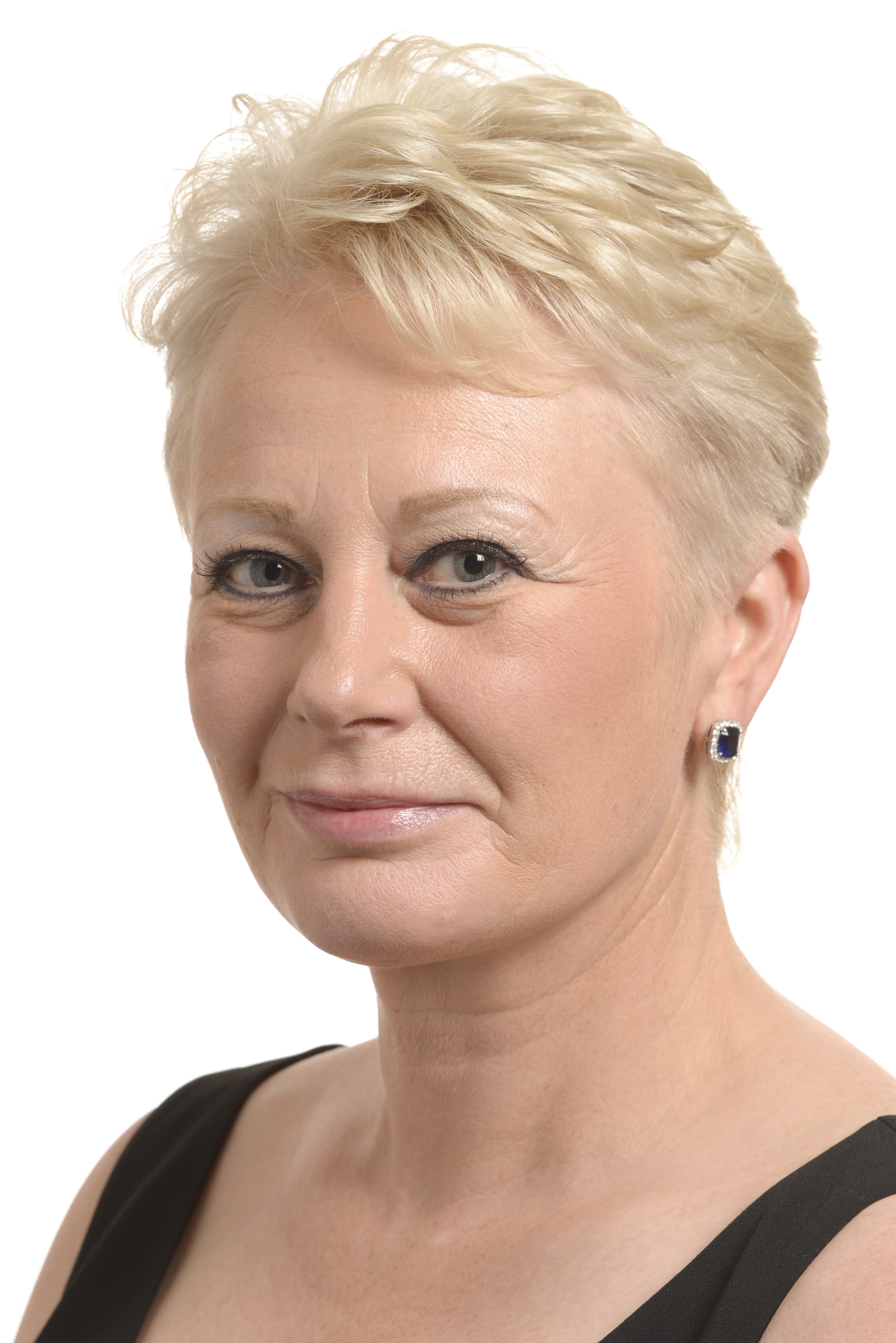

UKIP Spokesperson for Home Affairs
- In office 2 December 2016 – 18 October 2017
- Leader: Paul Nuttall; Steve Crowther (Acting); Henry Bolton
- Preceded by: Diane James
- Succeeded by: Richard Bingley
Other UKIP offices
UKIP Spokesperson for Justice
In office 16 September 2016 – 6 December 2016
Leader	Diane James; Nigel Farage (Acting)
Preceded by	Diane James
Succeeded by	Peter Jewell
UKIP Spokesperson for Work and Pensions
In office 24 July 2014 – 2 December 2016
Leader	Nigel Farage; Diane James; Nigel Farage (Acting)
Preceded by	Position established
Succeeded by	Andrew Charalambous

Member of the European Parliament for Yorkshire and the Humber
- In office 1 July 2014 – 1 July 2019
- Preceded by: Edward McMillan-Scott
- Succeeded by: John Longworth

Personal details
- Born: 17 February 1962 (age 64) Pontefract, West Riding of Yorkshire, England
- Party: UK Independence Party (until April 2019); Brexit Party (since April 2019)

Jane Maria Collins (born 17 February 1962) is a British politician and horse show-jumper who served as a Member of the European Parliament (MEP) for Yorkshire and the Humber from 2014 to 2019. She was elected in May 2014 as a member of the UK Independence Party (UKIP), but defected to the Brexit Party in 2019 in the last months of her membership of the European Parliament.

Collins served as UKIP's spokesperson on Employment law, Home Affairs and most recently on Animal Welfare. On 15 April 2019 she announced that she was leaving the party to join the Brexit Party.

== Early life and career ==
Collins was born in Pontefract, West Riding of Yorkshire and attended East Hardwick Junior School and Pontefract and District Girls High School, leaving at 18 with four GCE O-levels and a GCE A-level in Art.

On leaving school, Collins opted against going to college, preferring to develop an equestrian career. She began her equestrian career with a racehorse training establishment in Moss, South Yorkshire. An equine physiotherapist, she met Katie Bloom with whom she formed a partnership in 1995. Katie Bloom was (and remains) married to Godfrey Bloom, who later became a UK Independence Party (UKIP) MEP. Collins became interested in the party, which she joined in 2003.

== Political views ==
Interviewed by the Observer ahead of the September 2014 UKIP conference and therefore unable to discuss their new policies, Collins described herself as a "progressive libertarian". Referring to comments made by Godfrey Bloom on international aid (in a speech in which he referred to "Bongo-Bongo land"), she said that they were valid but badly expressed. She was concerned about "a developing health problem" in Sheffield in relation to the Roma community of Slovak origin. She claimed they had a higher incidence of hepatitis B, the subject of a planned vaccination program, which would put a greater strain on the health service. She also called for those indigenous children who are in close contact with the Roma to be vaccinated as well. In conclusion, journalist Daniel Boffey said Collins would continue Bloom's tradition of stirring controversy.

== Political career ==
=== Barnsley Central by-election, 2011 ===
Collins stood for UKIP in the March 2011 Barnsley Central by-election triggered by the resignation of Labour MP Eric Illsley over the UK parliamentary expenses scandal. She came second to Labour's Dan Jarvis, winning 12% of the vote. This was the first time a UKIP candidate had come second in any election.

=== Rotherham by-election, 2012 ===
She again stood for UKIP in the November 2012 Rotherham by-election triggered by the resignation of Labour MP Denis MacShane, also over the expenses scandal. She came second to Labour's Sarah Champion, winning almost 22% of the vote. It was at the time the highest share of the vote achieved by UKIP in a by-election. The by-election took place almost parallel with the inaugural police and crime commissioner elections. The timing combined with press reports concerning child sexual exploitation in Rotherham led to questions about the selection of the Labour candidate for police and crime commissioner, Shaun Wright who had been the cabinet member of the council responsible for children's services. During the by-election campaign a row also emerged after Rotherham's Labour council removed three foster children from the care of their foster parents, which the Daily Telegraph wrongly attributed to their membership of UKIP. However, in May 2013, Rotherham council apologised, saying that communication about the decision gave the impression that it related to the couple's UKIP membership. This impression was incorrect; the children were removed because it was in their "best interests", though full details couldn't be given "for legal reasons". The council said it had "taken action to strengthen the way it made decisions and how it communicated information."

=== Yorkshire and the Humber (European Parliament constituency) 2014 ===
She was selected to top the party's regional list for Yorkshire and the Humber in the 2014 European Parliament elections. Former UKIP MEP Godfrey Bloom stated that he gave her his "wholehearted support" and that she "is almost certainly going to be the next UKIP MEP".

=== Row over her campaigning in South Yorkshire police and crime commissioner by-election ===
In November 2014, whilst campaigning for UKIP in the 2014 South Yorkshire Police and Crime Commissioner by-election, Collins appeared to imply that Mark Russell, head of the evangelistic charity Church Army, was a paedophile. Russell had posted support for the Labour Party candidate in the by-election; this prompted Collins to tweet "Yes because we’d soon stop your criminal activity. Paedos leave our kids alone. #UKIP". Collins originally refused to apologise, but eventually deleted the tweet and offered to make a donation to the charity after Russell threatened to sue her. Her tweet followed accusations that UKIP exploited the suffering of Rotherham sex abuse victims for political gain in the by-election. One victim denounced the party's tactics as "disrespectful" after it launched a "1,400 reasons to vote" campaign, in reference to the estimated number of victims in the city between 1997 and 2013.

Collins' allegation was retweeted many times by UKIP supporters. In her defence, Collins said she apologised unreservedly and admitted “I’m a bit hot headed sometimes.”

=== Rotherham general election 2015 ===
She stood again for UKIP in Rotherham during the May 2015 general election. Once again she came second in the Labour safe seat, achieving over 30% of the share of the vote. It was one of the highest shares of votes achieved by UKIP candidates during the 2015 general election.

=== Defamation action ===
In September 2014 at a UKIP conference, Collins falsely alleged that three MPs, Sarah Champion, John Healey and Kevin Barron had known about widespread child sex abuse in Rotherham and failed to do anything about it. There was a live broadcast of the event on the BBC Parliament television channel.

The three MPs took legal action (they launched the action in 2014 and UKIP financially assisted Collins' defence). Defamation proceedings in a British court were placed on hold in May 2016 when Collins claimed her position as an MEP granted her immunity from prosecution. Under EU law "MEPs shall not be subject to any form of inquiry, detention or legal proceedings in respect of opinions expressed or votes cast by them in the performance of their duties". However, in October the European Parliament ruled that immunity did not apply in this case. Collins said the ruling was "one lost battle in a war of words I'm determined to win". Collins added she believed there were grounds for an appeal and was determined to fight the decision to make the "voices of Rotherham sexual exploitation survivors and their families heard".

In a statement, the three MPs said "We welcome the decision of the European Parliament and hope this matter can at long last now be brought to a conclusion in the High Court. This has gone on for over two years and she has tried every delaying tactic she can - including the absurd irony of a UKIP Euro MP trying to claim immunity from the European Parliament to avoid facing justice in the British courts." In February 2017, the High Court ruled that Collins should pay £54,000 in damages to each of the three MPs plus a contribution to legal costs. However, she failed to pay within the required timescale. It was reported at the beginning of 2018 that payment was still outstanding.

==== Third-party legal costs ====
In February 2018, following Collins' failure to pay, a High Court judge ruled that UKIP was jointly and severally liable with Collins for some of the costs. This liability arose because UKIP was held to have delayed settlement of the case before the United Kingdom general election of 2015 for party political reasons. The amount to be paid by UKIP was determined in March at £175,000. The party's financial position was stabilised and it was able to put forward candidates for the local government elections in May 2018.

=== UKIP leadership election 2017 ===
Collins ran to be the leader of UKIP following the resignation of Paul Nuttall (MEP) after the party's poor showing in a series of elections in 2017. Collins said she was standing in order to 'rebuild confidence in UKIP' and cited her two by-election campaigns and her success in the European Elections and her work for Godfrey Bloom as proof of her experience and track record of success for the party.

In an article in the Telegraph she said she was "offering a real alternative to the other options of EDL-lite or diet Labour". She also stated that she was a progressive libertarian who wanted the party to support low taxes and a small state and welcomed the news that former economics spokesman Patrick O'Flynn said his and Suzanne Evans's economic policies had been rejected in the party.

She had also criticised fellow candidate Anne Marie Waters for launching her leadership campaign in Rotherham. In a joint statement, UKIP MEP Jane Collins and councillor Allen Cowles, leader of UKIP's elected councillors in Rotherham, said they supported the decision to cancel the planned stadium rally and urged the party's councillors to boycott Waters' campaign launch. Mr Cowles said: "UKIP councillors wish to make it clear that they do not condone in any way the views Ms Waters has previously expressed, or what she stands for."

Collins finished the election in sixth place out of the field of seven candidates, garnering 4.4% of the vote.

=== Brexit Party ===
On 15 April 2019, following Gerard Batten's unequivocal defence, on the Andrew Marr show, of a UKIP candidate's tweet about rape as satire, Collins announced that she was leaving the party to join the Brexit Party, saying UKIP's attitude to women was "disgusting" and, having campaigned against child sexual exploitation in Rotherham, it was "simply impossible" for her to remain in the party. She added Nigel Farage's new party was the best way of achieving a "real Brexit".
