= 1994 Rotherham by-election =

UK parliamentary by-election

- 5 May 1994
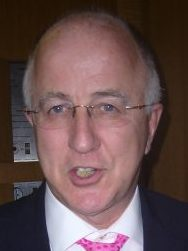

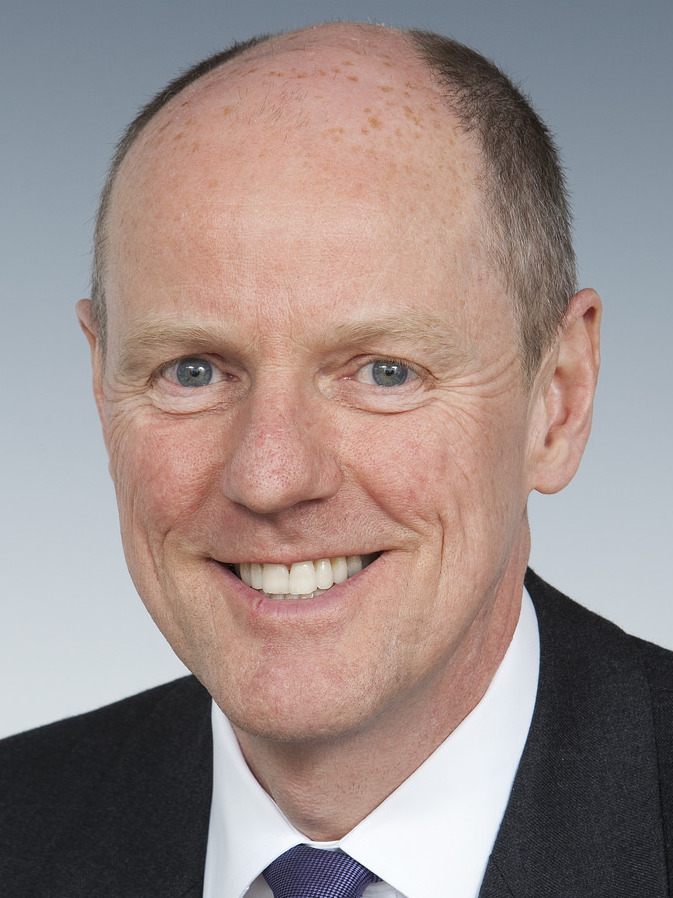
	First party	Second party	Third party
		LD
Candidate	Denis MacShane	David Wildgoose	Nick Gibb
Party	Labour	Liberal Democrats	Conservative
Popular vote	14,912	7,958	2,649
Percentage	55.6%	29.7%	9.9%
Swing	▼8.3%	▲17.4%	▼13.8%
MP before election
Jimmy Boyce
Labour
Elected MP
Denis MacShane
Labour

The 1994 Rotherham by-election was held on 5 May 1994, following the death of Labour Party Member of Parliament for Rotherham Jimmy Boyce. Boyce had won the seat only at the 1992 UK general election, but it had been continuously held by Labour since 1933, usually with a large majority. As a result, Labour were clear favourites to hold at the by-election. Labour decided to stand Denis MacShane, the director of the European Policy Institute. A former journalist and trade union employee, he had unsuccessfully contested Solihull at the October 1974 UK general election.

The Conservative Party had taken a distant second place in 1992, and having lost the previous two by-elections of the term to the Liberal Democrats, they were not hopeful of gaining ground. They chose to stand Nick Gibb, a chartered accountant working for KPMG. The Liberal Democrats had taken less than one eighth of the votes cast in 1992, a significant decrease from the previous election. Despite this, they stood the same candidate, David Wildgoose. Two other candidates stood: Screaming Lord Sutch of the Official Monster Raving Loony Party, and Keith Laycock of the Natural Law Party.

== Result ==
As expected, MacShane easily won the seat, although, disappointingly for the main opposition party, his vote was more than eight percent down on Boyce's. Wildgoose improved his fortunes, more than doubling his vote, and taking second place. Gibb took less than ten percent of the votes, falling to a distant third place. Sutch was able to record his best ever result, taking 1,114 votes and a 4.2% share - within a percentage point of the Loonies retaining a deposit for the first time.

At the 1997 UK general election, MacShane retained the seat, with an increased majority. Wildgoose also stood, but proved unable to equal his performance in 1994, and by 2001 moved to contest Wentworth. At the 2012 Rotherham by-election, Wildgoose contested the seat again, though on this occasion as an English Democrat, ironically polling more votes than the Liberal Democrat candidate. Gibb became one of the few new Conservatives to enter Parliament in 1997, winning Bognor Regis and Littlehampton. Sutch stood in several subsequent by-elections, but was never able to beat his total in Rotherham.

Rotherham by-election, 1994
Party	Candidate	Votes	%	±%
Labour	Denis MacShane	14,912	55.6	−8.3
Liberal Democrats	David Wildgoose	7,958	29.7	+17.4
Conservative	Nick Gibb	2,649	9.9	−13.8
Monster Raving Loony	Screaming Lord Sutch	1,114	4.2	New
Natural Law	Keith Laycock	173	0.6	New
Majority		6,954	25.9	−14.3
Turnout		26,806	43.7	−28.0
Labour hold		Swing	-2.8	

== Previous result ==
General election 1992: Rotherham
Party	Candidate	Votes	%	±%
Labour	Jimmy Boyce	27,933	63.9	+4.2
Conservative	Stephen Yorke	10,372	23.7	+1.6
Liberal Democrats	David Wildgoose	5,375	12.3	−5.9
Majority		17,561	40.2	+2.6
Turnout		43,680	71.7	+2.5
Labour hold		Swing	+1.3	

== See also ==
- Rotherham by-election for contests of 1899, 1910, 1917, 1976 and 2012
