= 1933 Rotherham by-election =

UK Parliamentary by-election

The 1933 Rotherham by-election was held on 27 February 1933. The by-election was held due to the resignation of the incumbent Conservative MP, George Herbert. It was won by the Labour candidate William Dobbie.

Rotherham by-election, 1933
| Party | Candidate | Votes | % | ±% |
|---|---|---|---|---|
| Labour | William Dobbie | 28,767 | 69.1 | +19.9 |
| Conservative | Henry Drummond Wolff | 12,893 | 30.9 | −19.9 |
| Majority | | 15,874 | 38.2 | N/A |
| Turnout | | 41,660 | 73.5 | −9.1 |
| Labour gain from Conservative | | Swing | | |
