= 1917 Rotherham by-election =

UK parliamentary by-election

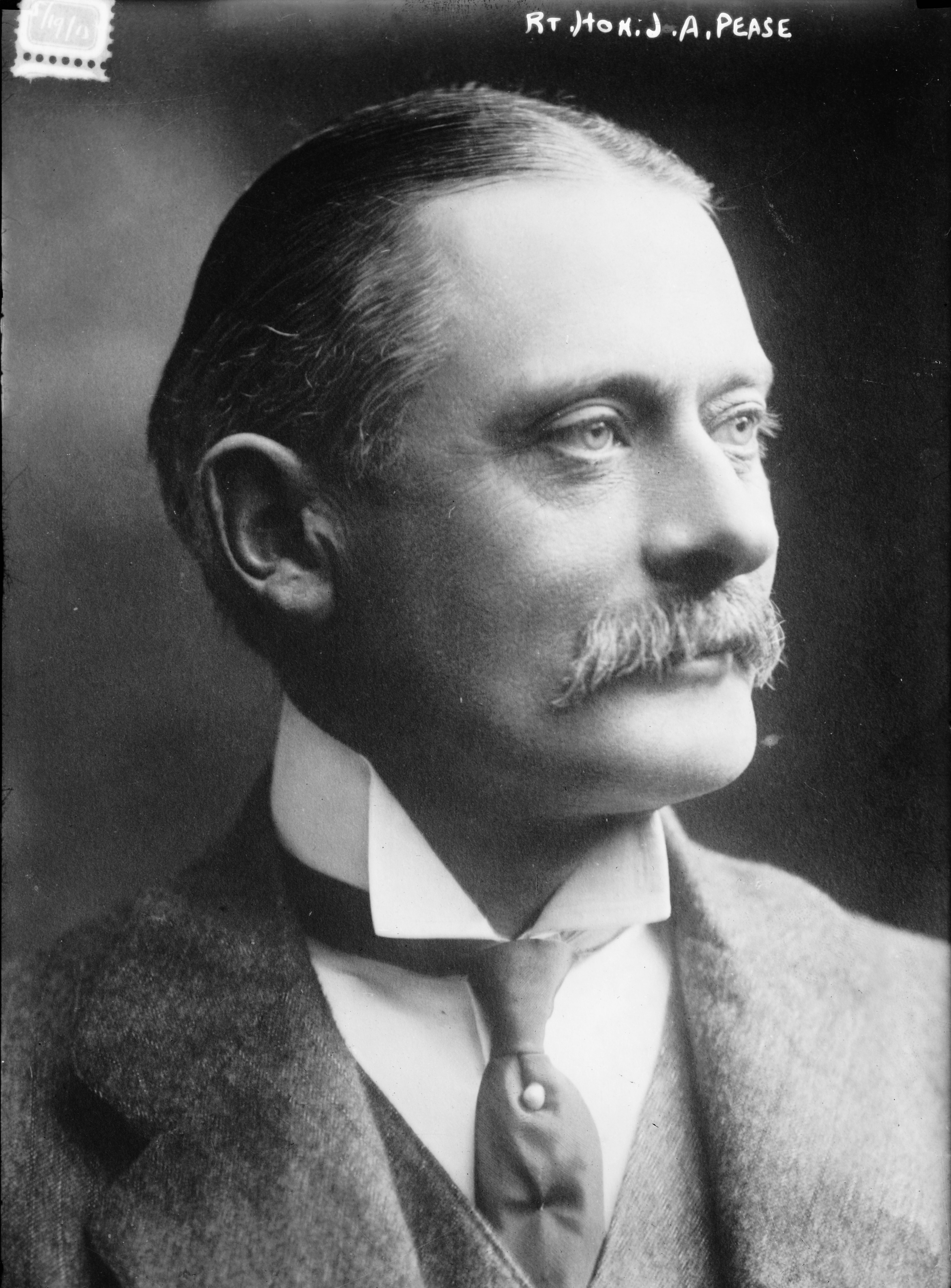
Jack Pease

The 1917 Rotherham by-election was a parliamentary by-election held for the UK House of Commons constituency of Rotherham in the West Riding of Yorkshire on 5 February 1917.

== Vacancy ==
The by-election was caused by the elevation to the peerage of the sitting Liberal MP, Joseph ‘Jack’ Pease.

== Candidates ==
Arthur Richardson, circa 1905

The Rotherham Liberals adopted Arthur Richardson as their new candidate. Richardson had been Lib-Lab MP for Nottingham South from 1906 until January 1910. Richardson immediately declared his position as being in favour of the successful prosecution of the war and the defeat of German militarism.

No nominations were received from the other parties, who were apparently content to honour the wartime electoral truce and Richardson was therefore returned unopposed.

== Result ==
Rotherham by-election, 1917
Party	Candidate	Votes	%	±%
Liberal	Arthur Richardson	Unopposed	N/A	N/A
Liberal hold				

== See also ==
- List of United Kingdom by-elections
- United Kingdom by-election records
- Rotherham by-election for contests of 1899, 1910, 1976, 1994 and 2012
