= 1899 Rotherham by-election =

UK parliamentary by-election

The 1899 Rotherham by-election was a parliamentary by-election held on 23 February 1899 for the UK House of Commons constituency of Rotherham in the West Riding of Yorkshire.

== Vacancy ==
The by-election was caused by the resignation of the sitting Liberal MP, the Rt. Hon. Sir Arthur Dyke Acland, fearful of a breakdown in his health and following the death of his father in 1898.

== Candidates ==
=== Liberals ===
Acland’s possible resignation had been spoken of publicly since the summer of 1898 and the local Liberal Association had met in July of that year to discuss the implications. They were reluctant to lose Acland as their MP in view of his standing and record in politics and government but a formal request to him to reconsider his decision to stand down made by Rotherham Liberals fell on deaf ears. However, Acland was willing to delay his resignation to enable the local party to find a suitable replacement and the search began at the end of July. Their choice was William Henry Holland, a 49-year-old textile manufacturer, originally from Manchester where he had had a successful career in local government having been an Alderman on Manchester City Council. He was also formerly MP for Salford North.

=== Conservatives ===
Rotherham was considered a safe Liberal seat. It had been represented by Acland for the Liberals since its creation for the 1885 general election and Acland had always enjoyed comfortable majorities. In fact at the two elections preceding the by-election, a by-election in 1892 when he had to resign on appointment as Vice-President of the Committee of the Council on Education, and the 1895 general election, Acland had been returned unopposed. This time however, with the prospect of facing a new candidate, the Conservatives chose to fight. They selected a barrister from York, R H Vernon Wragge, to be their man.

== Campaign ==
Holland relied heavily on the personal support of the former MP. Acland, although too unwell to campaign on the ground, sent letters of support praising Holland as worthy of the confidence of Liberals and Radicals in Rotherham. Holland also obtained the backing of the local Irish community in view of his support for the question of Irish Home Rule.

Wragge leant on the record of the Unionist government and the support by telegram of the prime minister. He also enlisted a number of local MPs and peers to support him at his meetings in the constituency.

== Result ==
Holland held the seat for the Liberal Party with nearly 60% of the poll but with a reduced majority on the last contested election, the 1892 general election. However, the Liberals had been victorious in the country in 1892 and the same tide could not be said to be running through the nation in 1899. In addition Holland was previously unknown in the constituency and was replacing a popular local MP.

William Holland

Rotherham by-election, 1899
Party	Candidate	Votes	%	±%
Liberal	William Henry Holland	6,671	58.6	N/A
Conservative	R H V Wragge	4,714	41.4	New
Majority		1,957	17.2	N/A
Turnout		11,385	77.1	N/A
Liberal hold		Swing	N/A	

== See also ==
- List of United Kingdom by-elections
- United Kingdom by-election records
