= Cheltenham by-election =

Cheltenham by-election may refer to one of three 20th-century by-elections held for the British House of Commons constituency of Cheltenham in Gloucestershire:

- 1911 Cheltenham by-election
- 1928 Cheltenham by-election
- 1937 Cheltenham by-election

== See also ==
- Cheltenham constituency
- Cheltenham
- List of United Kingdom by-elections
- United Kingdom by-election records
