= Roger Everest =

Welsh barrister (born 1939)

Roger Joseph Everest (born 1939) is a Welsh barrister and independent parliamentary candidate.

He was educated at Llandaff Cathedral School, Kingswood School, Bath, and the University of Wales. He contested the Caerphilly constituency for the Conservative Party in the February 1974 general election, and the Brecon and Radnor by-election in July 1985 as a One Nation Conservative. He fought the 1997 Winchester by-election as an independent and fought the 1999 Eddisbury by-election and the constituency of Cheltenham in the 2001 general election under the same banner.

He defended Robert Ashman on charges of murder of Andrew Pennington and attempted murder of the Liberal Democrat MP, Nigel Jones MP. He later stood as an independent candidate against Nigel Jones in Cheltenham.

In 2003 he gained some attention to his claim that he had been refused an appointment as a circuit judge because he was not a Freemason. In 2012 he called for a police corruption case related to the Murder of Lynette White to be reopened.

He is a former member of the Bow Group.
