= William Hicks-Beach =

William Hicks-Beach may refer to:

- William Hicks-Beach (1783–1856), Member of Parliament for Malmesbury 1812–1817
- William Frederick Hicks-Beach (1841–1923), Member of Parliament for Tewkesbury 1916–1918
- William Whitehead Hicks-Beach (1907–1975), Conservative Party Member of Parliament for Cheltenham 1950–1964
