= Surgery (politics) =

One-on-one consultation where politicians meet with their constituents

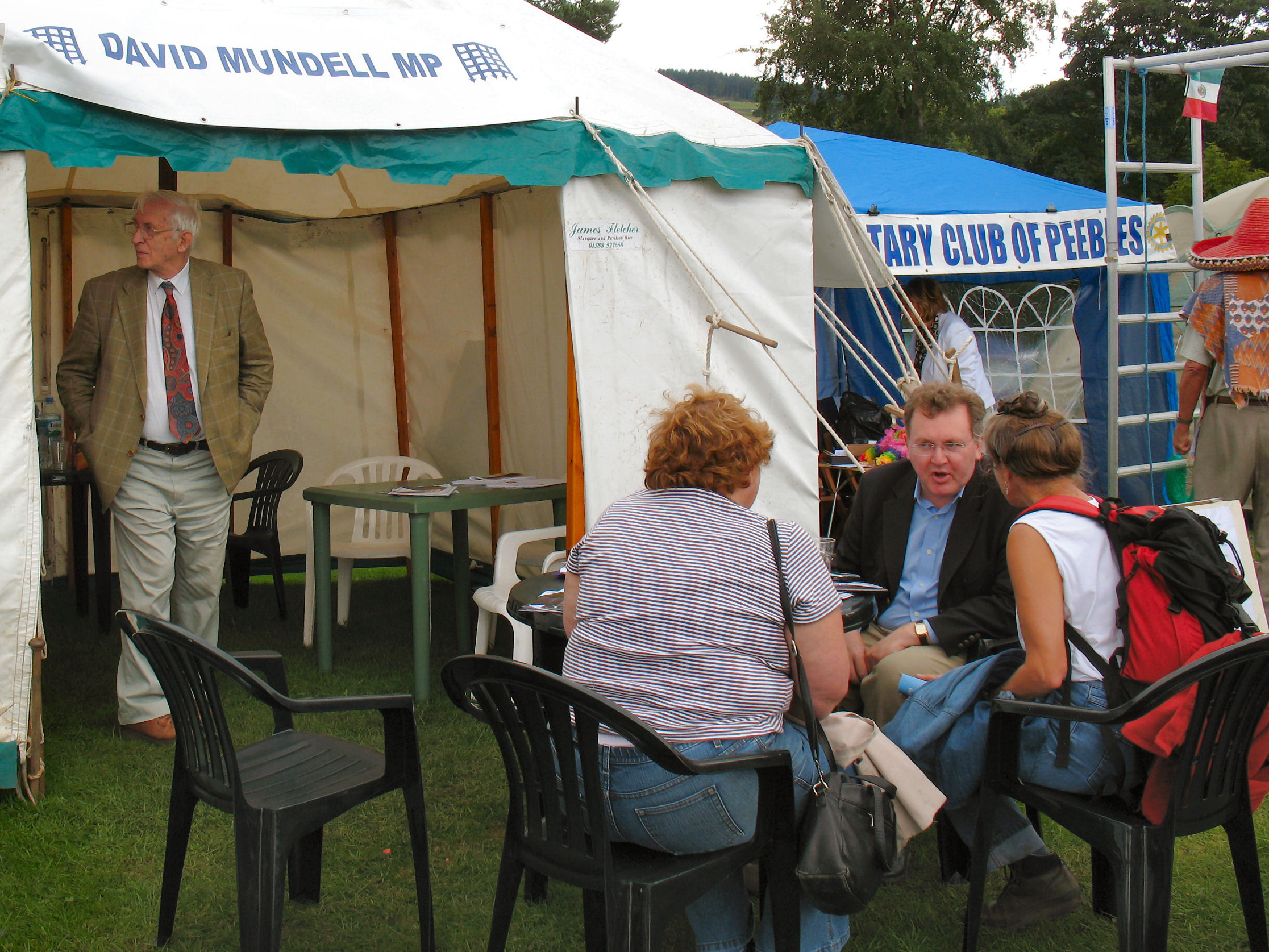
MP David Mundell holding a drop-in surgery at the Peebles Agricultural Show

A political surgery, constituency surgery, constituency clinic, mobile office or sometimes advice surgery, in British and Irish politics, is a series of one-to-one meetings that a Member of Parliament (MP), Teachta Dála (TD) or other political officeholder may have with their constituents. At a surgery, constituents may raise issues of concern or request assistance in regard to local or national government matters. (Note: "Surgeries". Parliament of the United Kingdom.) Often the constituent's issue will be followed up by a caseworker or assistant. Surgery meetings are usually confidential in contrast to town hall meetings, which are open to many people at the same time.

== Etymology ==
One meaning of the word "surgery" in British English is "the time during which a doctor, dentist or vet is available to see patients". The use in politics reflects this meaning.

== Practice ==
It is up to each MP to decide whether they have any surgeries at all and if so, how many and in what locations. MPs often use local party offices, church halls or rooms in public houses as the venues, with a number of surgeries possibly being held at different locations around a constituency. Surgeries are traditionally held on Fridays or at weekends when MPs have returned from sittings of parliament in Westminster. Some MPs' surgeries are "appointment only", (Note: "Surgeries". Julian Smith. Archived from the original on 2022-05-17.) some "drop-in", (Note: "Advice Surgeries". Hilary Benn. Archived from the original on 2022-05-30.) and others a mix. An MP with a large constituency will sometimes hold surgeries in a wide range of locations during the summer recess. (Note: "Summer Tour 2021". Tim Farron. Archived from the original on 2022-05-30.)

In the Republic of Ireland, clinics/surgeries are an even more important source of publicity and contact for Teachtaí Dála (TDs) and other representatives, as under the PR-STV system there are very few truly safe seats. (Note: Hanan, Robin (2011-02-14). "The 'clinic system' and political reform". Robin Hanan for Seanad Éireann. Archived from the original on 2022-03-27.) (Note: Komito, Lee (1993). "Personalism and Brokerage in Dublin Politics". Irish Urban Cultures. Belfast: Queen's University Belfast Institute of Irish Studies: 79–98. Archived from the original on 2022-03-02 – via University College Dublin.) One paper published by Queen's University Belfast's Institute of Irish Studies states

Clinics, for instance, appear to epitomize personalistic politics — individuals are asking politicians for personal assistance, and, as they receive it, they become clients of the politician and vote accordingly. The evidence is otherwise. Voters make the rounds of all the politicians, trying to play one off against the other. Even if they are helped, there is no certainty that they will vote for the politician at the next election. Politicians are all well aware that clinics are a very mixed blessing indeed; the major reason given for holding clinics is their publicity value. It is important that voters in an area feel they are getting some attention from the politician; without it, they might decide to transfer their votes to a politician who demonstrates greater concern for the area. Thus, the clinics are part of the general strategy of maximizing a reputation in the local community, rather than a means of obtaining the support of specific individuals.

The term mobile office has been used in Australian politics and in American politics.

== Incidents ==
As an opportunity for the public to meet directly with politicians, surgeries have been noted as a significant security risk. Three MPs have been murdered at surgeries – Robert Bradford in 1981, Jo Cox in 2016, and David Amess in 2021 – while Stephen Timms (2010) and Nigel Jones (2000) survived attacks, though Jones's assistant, Andrew Pennington, died. Security for MPs during surgeries and in constituency offices was increased after the killing of Cox. (Note: Glaze, Ben (2021-10-15). "Tragic David Amess raised alarm over attacks on MPs after 'barbaric' Jo Cox murder". Daily Mirror.) (Note: "Sir David Amess killing: Should MPs still be able to meet the public?". BBC News. 2021-10-16.)

== See also ==
- Meet-the-People Sessions, a similar practice in Singapore
- Town hall meeting, mainly in North America
