= 1983 Cheltenham Borough Council election =

Cheltenham Borough Council election

The 1983 Cheltenham Council election took place on 5 May 1983 to elect members of Cheltenham Borough Council in Gloucestershire, England. The whole council was up for election on new boundaries. The Conservatives fell one seat short of a majority, meaning the council stayed in no overall control.

After the election, the composition of the council was

- Conservative 16
- SDP–Liberal Alliance 12
- Residents Associations 3
- Labour 1
- Independent Conservative 1

== Election result ==
Cheltenham local election result 1983
Party	Seats	Gains	Losses	Net gain/loss	Seats %	Votes %	Votes	+/−
Conservative	16	0	0	-	48.5	41.1	14,880	
Alliance	12	0	0	-	36.4	35.3	12,769	
Residents	3	0	0	-	9.1	7.0	2,518	
Labour	1	0	0	-	3.0	9.2	3,322	
Ind. Conservative	1	0	0	-	3.0	3.4	1,219	
Independent	0	0	0	-	0.0	2.7	976	
Ecology	0	0	0	-	0.0	1.4	509	

== Ward results ==
All Saints
Party	Candidate	Votes	%	±%
Conservative	Reginald Beagley	1,433	53.6	
Alliance	Adelaide Hodges*	1,387	51.9	
Conservative	Roy Miles	1,347	50.4	
Alliance	Alastair Jollans*	1,314	49.1	
Conservative	Robert Maxwell	1,304	48.8	
Alliance	Richard Tocknell	1,230	46.0	
Majority		33	1.3	
Turnout		2,674	41.0	
Conservative win (new seat)				
Alliance win (new seat)				
Conservative win (new seat)				

Charlton Kings
Party	Candidate	Votes	%	±%
Residents	Mary Whyte*	1,640	56.1	
Residents	Donald Perry*	1,629	55.7	
Conservative	Victor Stanton*	1,577	53.9	
Residents	Anthony Jeans	1,564	53.5	
Conservative	Alan Pearce	1,215	41.5	
Conservative	Margaret Heapey**	1,151	39.4	
Majority		13	0.4	
Turnout		2,925	45.7	
Residents win (new seat)				
Residents win (new seat)				
Conservative win (new seat)				

Margaret Heapey was a sitting councillor in St Paul's ward.

College
Party	Candidate	Votes	%	±%
Alliance	Kenneth Hammond*	1,841	52.6	
Conservative	Bryan Howell	1,808	51.6	
Conservative	Michael Sheppard	1,798	51.4	
Conservative	Geoffrey Hester	1,679	48.0	
Alliance	Philip Gray*	1,606	45.9	
Alliance	William Harrington	1,484	42.4	
Ecology	David Swindley	283	8.2	
Majority		119	3.4	
Turnout		3,501	53.5	
Alliance win (new seat)				
Conservative win (new seat)				
Conservative win (new seat)				

Hatherley
Party	Candidate	Votes	%	±%
Alliance	Gerald Bingham*	2,068	60.9	
Alliance	Eric Phillips*	2,063	60.7	
Alliance	Jeremy Whales	2,026	59.6	
Conservative	Daphne Pennell	1,468	43.2	
Conservative	John Heapey	1,293	38.1	
Conservative	Tim Spencer-Cox	1,273	37.5	
Majority		33	16.4	
Turnout		3,397	52.5	
Alliance win (new seat)				
Alliance win (new seat)				
Alliance win (new seat)				

Hesters Way
Party	Candidate	Votes	%	±%
Residents	Richard Sturdy*	878	35.1	
Labour	Terence Ruck	876	35.0	
Conservative	Harry Turbyfield	836	33.4	
Conservative	John Craddock	763	30.5	
Labour	Clive Harriss	763	30.5	
Labour	Martin Hale	705	28.2	
Alliance	Jean Holder	679	27.2	
Alliance	Christopher Morris	610	24.4	
Alliance	Raymond Drewett	554	22.2	
Independent	Garth Barnes*	482	19.3	
Independent	Harold Stephens	354	14.2	
Majority		73	2.9	
Turnout		2,500	38.6	
Residents win (new seat)				
Labour win (new seat)				
Conservative win (new seat)				

Lansdown
Party	Candidate	Votes	%	±%
Conservative	Aileen Bramah	1,583	68.4	
Conservative	May Dent*	1,568	67.8	
Conservative	Aimbury Dodwell*	1,506	65.1	
Alliance	Ronald Hunt	730	31.6	
Alliance	Patsy Thornton	690	29.8	
Alliance	Robert Washington	642	27.7	
Ecology	Christopher Walford	222	9.6	
Majority		776	33.5	
Turnout		2,314	41.3	
Conservative win (new seat)				
Conservative win (new seat)				
Conservative win (new seat)				

Park
Party	Candidate	Votes	%	±%
Conservative	Charles Irving*	2,025	65.1	
Conservative	Maureen Stafford	1,893	60.9	
Conservative	William Bullingham	1,683	54.1	
Alliance	Dorothy Staight	1,087	35.0	
Alliance	Alan Goodridge	964	31.0	
Alliance	Laurence Taylor	907	29.2	
Majority		596	19.1	
Turnout		3,109	57.0	
Conservative win (new seat)				
Conservative win (new seat)				
Conservative win (new seat)				

Pittville
Party	Candidate	Votes	%	±%
Conservative	Peter Pennell	1,124	40.3	
Conservative	Kenneth Burke	1,101	39.5	
Conservative	Christopher Britton	1,068	38.3	
Labour	James Pennington	992	35.6	
Labour	Michael King	938	33.7	
Labour	Ann McGovern	925	33.2	
Alliance	Bernard Fisher	796	28.6	
Alliance	Anthony Rudge	736	26.4	
Alliance	Susan Simpkins	678	24.3	
Majority		76	2.7	
Turnout		2,786	45.0	
Conservative win (new seat)				
Conservative win (new seat)				
Conservative win (new seat)				

St Mark's
Party	Candidate	Votes	%	±%
Alliance	Brian Cassin*	1,550	56.9	
Alliance	Janet Watson*	1,485	54.5	
Alliance	Alexis Cassin	1,446	53.1	
Conservative	Ronald Tapsell	723	26.5	
Conservative	William Fisher*	707	25.9	
Conservative	Lorraine Pennell	673	24.7	
Labour	Abraham Yates	547	20.1	
Labour	William Evans	537	19.7	
Labour	John Hurley	507	18.6	
Majority		723	26.6	
Turnout		2,725	45.5	
Alliance win (new seat)				
Alliance win (new seat)				
Alliance win (new seat)				

St Paul's
Party	Candidate	Votes	%	±%
Alliance	John Rawson	1,343	53.0	
Ind. Conservative	Dudley Aldridge*	1,219	48.1	
Alliance	Paul Baker	968	38.2	
Alliance	Geoffrey Furniss	966	38.1	
Conservative	Robert Wilson	904	35.6	
Conservative	Francis Jones	894	35.3	
Labour	Kristine Mason	466	18.4	
Labour	Christine Stoakes	431	17.0	
Labour	Sandra Thomas	417	16.4	
Majority		2	0.1	
Turnout		2,536	44.6	
Alliance win (new seat)				
Ind. Conservative win (new seat)				
Alliance win (new seat)				

St Peter's
Party	Candidate	Votes	%	±%
Conservative	Roy Marchant*	1,398	50.4	
Alliance	Peter Liddell*	1,288	46.4	
Alliance	Gilbert Wakeley*	1,246	44.9	
Alliance	Alvin Harrison	1,075	38.7	
Conservative	John Jackson	975	35.1	
Conservative	Meg West	947	34.1	
Labour	Timothy Sedgwick-Jell	441	15.9	
Labour	Dorothy Herring	430	15.5	
Labour	Roger Whyborn	388	14.0	
Independent	Burgess Cooper	140	5.0	
Majority		171	6.2	
Turnout		2,776	47.6	
Conservative win (new seat)				
Alliance win (new seat)				
Alliance win (new seat)				
