= 1937 Cheltenham by-election =

1937 UK parliamentary by-election

The 1937 Cheltenham by-election was a parliamentary by-election held on 22 June 1937 for the British House of Commons constituency of Cheltenham in Gloucestershire.

The seat had become vacant when the constituency's Conservative Member of Parliament (MP), Sir Walter Preston, had resigned from the House of Commons on 27 May 1937. He had held the seat since a by-election in 1928, having previously been MP for Mile End from 1918 to 1923.

The local Conservative Party refused to endorse Daniel Lipson as its candidate following an anti-Jewish whispering campaign. Lipson won as an Independent Conservative and was re-elected at the 1945 general election as a National Independent, although his vote collapsed in the 1950 election when he lost to the Conservative Party candidate William Hicks Beach.

== Result ==
Cheltenham by-election, 22nd June 1937
Party	Candidate	Votes	%	±%
Ind. Conservative	Daniel Lipson	10,533	40.0	New
Conservative	R. T. Harper	10,194	38.8	−31.7
Labour	Cyril Poole	5,570	21.2	−8.3
Majority		339	1.2	N/A
Turnout		26,297	69.3	−1.1
Ind. Conservative gain from Conservative		Swing		

== See also ==
- Cheltenham constituency
- 1911 Cheltenham by-election
- 1928 Cheltenham by-election
- Cheltenham
- Lists of United Kingdom by-elections
- United Kingdom by-election records
