= John Taylor, Baron Taylor of Warwick =

British politician (born 1952)

The Right Honourable The Lord Taylor of Warwick
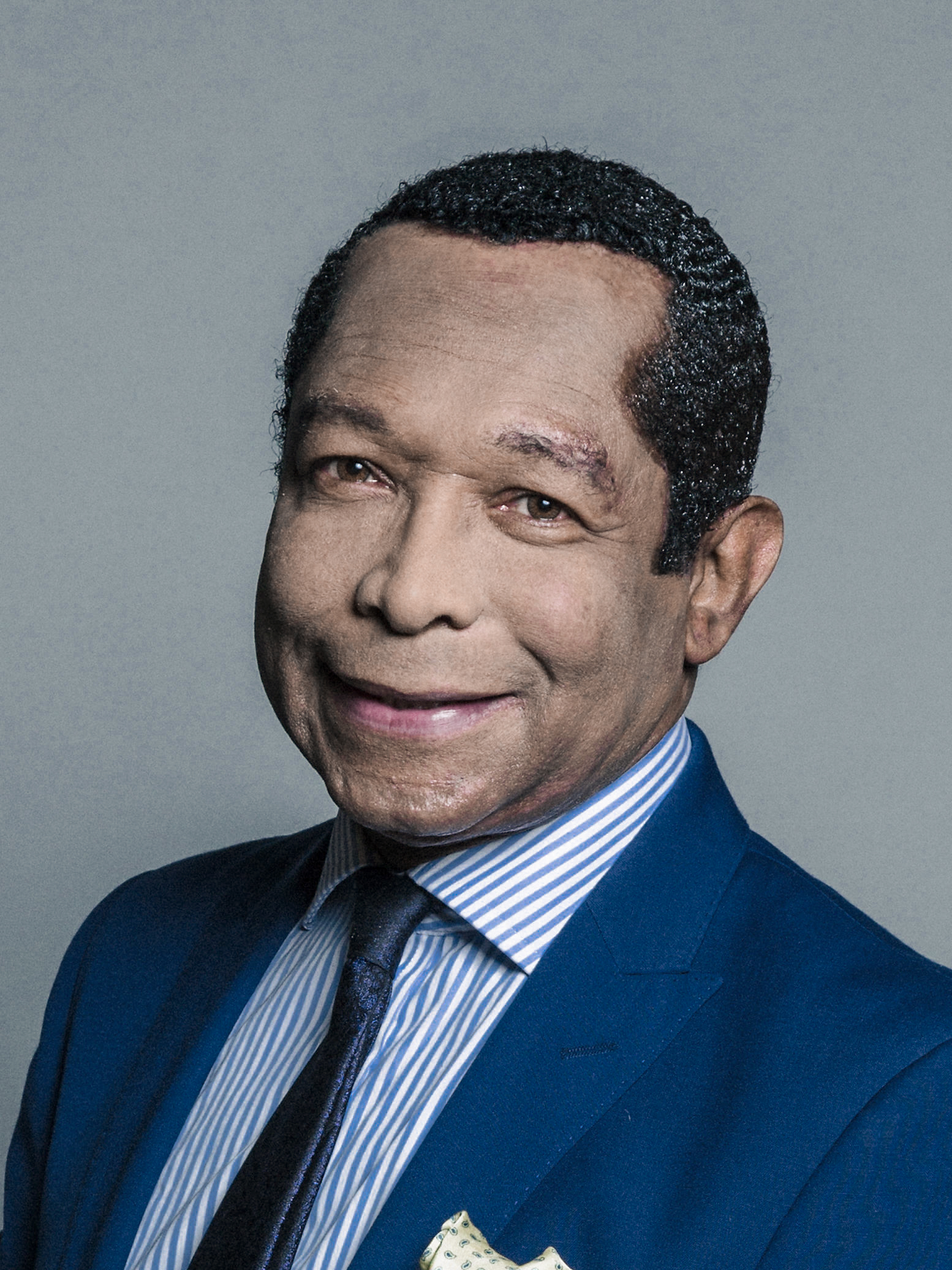
- Official UK Parliament photo, 2018

Member of the House of Lords
- Lord Temporal
- Life peerage 2 October 1996

Personal details
- Born: John David Beckett Taylor; 21 September 1952 (age 74) Birmingham, England
- Party: None (non-affiliated)
- Other political affiliations: Conservative (before 2010)
- Spouse: Laura Colleen Taylor
- Website: www.lordtaylor.org

John David Beckett Taylor, Baron Taylor of Warwick (born 21 September 1952) is a member of the House of Lords in the Parliament of the United Kingdom. In 1996, at the age of 44, he became one of the youngest people in the upper house.

Taylor is the third person of Afro-Caribbean ancestry to enter the House of Lords. He initially practised as a barrister, and served as a part-time deputy district judge (magistrates' courts). Following the UK parliamentary expenses scandal he was sentenced to 12 months' imprisonment, relating to £11,277 in falsely claimed expenses, and was subsequently disbarred. He has also been a company director and television and radio presenter.

== Early life ==
Taylor was born on 21 September 1952 in Birmingham, England, to Jamaican immigrants: his father, Derief Taylor, was a professional cricketer and coach for Warwickshire, and his mother, Enid, was a nurse. Taylor attended Moseley Grammar School in Birmingham where he was head boy, and later attended Keele University, where he studied English Literature and Law, followed by the Inns of Court School of Law in London.

== Career ==
=== Legal ===
Taylor was called to the bar in 1978, by Gray's Inn, where he was also awarded the Gray's Inn Advocacy Award, and Norman Tapp Memorial Prize for excellence in mooting. Taylor undertook his pupillage at 1 Dr Johnson's Buildings, and then joined the same chambers as the future Justice Secretary, Ken Clarke. Taylor practised from there on the Midland & Oxford Circuit. In 1997, Taylor was appointed as a part-time district judge (Magistrates' Court). He was disbarred after his conviction and imprisonment related to the United Kingdom parliamentary expenses scandal.

=== Political ===
In the 1980s, Taylor was elected to Solihull Council for the safe Conservative Party ward of St Alphege at a by-election in 1985 and was re-elected for a 4-year term in May 1988. He contested Birmingham Perry Barr for the Conservative Party at the 1987 general election, losing by 6,933 votes. He was selected by Conservative Party's Central Office to become the Conservative candidate for Cheltenham at the 1992 general election. The campaign was seen as having been influenced by race, with Taylor's Caribbean background reportedly causing concern to some members of the local Conservative Party constituency association, which was split by the issue. Conservative Central Office expelled association members over the issue. John Major, then Prime Minister, campaigned for Taylor in Cheltenham, but he lost the seat to Nigel Jones of the Liberal Democrats by 1,668 votes, the first time since 1950 Cheltenham had not voted for a Conservative candidate and the first time since December 1910 it had voted for a Liberal-aligned candidate.

Taylor was made a life peer as Baron Taylor of Warwick, of Warwick in the County of Warwickshire on 2 October 1996, on the recommendation of Prime Minister John Major. At 44, he became one of the youngest life peers to sit in the House of Lords at the time.

=== Other activities ===
Taylor is a Christian, and has volunteered time for various charities including Kidscape, Parents for Children, SCAR (Sickle Cell Anemia Relief), Variety Club Children's Charity of Great Britain, Warwick Leadership Foundation and WISCA (West Indian Senior Citizens' Association).

In 2016, he appeared on the Fox News channel to discuss the potential impact of Britain leaving the European Union (Brexit).

Other positions Taylor has held include:

- Television presenter, Crime Stalker (Carlton Television); Talk About (BBC One); Powerhouse (Channel 4)
- Non-executive Director, Currencies Direct Ltd (resigned July 2010); Mottram Holdings PLC
- Consultant, Kleinwort Benson Bank
- Chancellor, Bournemouth University, 2001–2006.
- Vice President, National Small Business Bureau; British Board of Film Classification, 1998–2008.
- Member of the International Trade Council.
- Special Adviser to the Home Secretary and Home Office Ministers, 1990–1991.
- Founder of the Warwick Leadership Academy (2014 to present) providing services to young people.

== Parliamentary expenses scandal ==
In early 2009, a major political scandal was triggered by the leaking and subsequent publication of expense claims made by members of the United Kingdom Parliament.

Several hundred members of the House of Commons and House of Lords were involved in the expenses scandal, However, only two peers—Taylor and Lord Hanningfield— were charged and convicted. Critics have noted disparities in the handling of these cases, highlighting that other peers, such as Baroness Uddin, avoided prosecution despite being ordered to repay larger sums. Baroness Uddin was investigated for allegedly claiming at least £180,000 in expenses by designating an empty flat as her main residence. She was suspended from the House of Lords until the end of 2012 and ordered to repay £125,349.

Taylor's defence in the Crown Court was that on appointment to the House of Lords he had asked other peers for advice on expenses and allowances and that he was told that the overnight subsistence allowance, the office allowance, and the travel expenses were provided in lieu of a salary, as well as the daily attendance allowance. As a result of claiming for the cost of journeys he had not made, and the cost of accommodation he had not occupied, Taylor was convicted of six counts of false accounting.

In his summing up to the jury, Mr Justice Saunders observed that Taylor was a man of good character who had devoted a lot of time to helping others. The judge imposed a sentence of 12 months' imprisonment, relating to £11,277 in falsely claimed expenses; he also said that the expenses scandal had "left an indelible stain on Parliament". Taylor’s defence was further weakened by the refusal of 15 members of the House of Lords to testify on his behalf. On 16 July 2010, Taylor resigned the Conservative Party Whip.

== Personal life ==
Taylor married in 1981 and had three children with his wife. They divorced in 2005. The Daily Telegraph reported that Taylor is an evangelical Christian, and in 2009 he married an evangelical Christian from the US. That marriage lasted 24 days and was annulled in 2010. In 2015, Taylor married Laura Colleen Taylor, another US national.

Orders of precedence in the United Kingdom
Preceded by The Lord Currie of Marylebone	Gentlemen; Baron Taylor of Warwick	Followed by The Lord Saatchi
