= Daniel Lipson =

British politician (1886–1963)

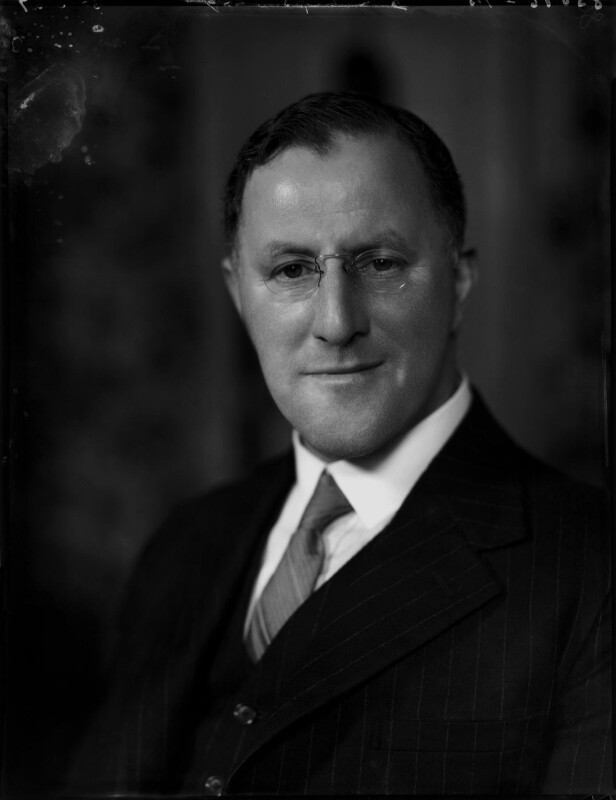
Lipson

Daniel Leopold Lipson (26 March 1886 – 14 April 1963) was a politician in the United Kingdom.

== Life ==
Daniel Lipson was born in Sheffield in 1886, the son of H. R. Lipson. He was educated at Sheffield Royal Grammar School and Corpus Christi College, Cambridge, where he graduated with an MA.

Originally a teacher at Cheltenham College and later a headmaster, he became a member of Cheltenham Town Council and an Alderman on Gloucestershire County Council. He served as mayor of Cheltenham during the 1930s, before he was elected as an Independent Conservative Member of Parliament for the Cheltenham constituency at a by-election in 1937, the local Conservative party having refused to endorse him as its candidate following an anti-semitic whispering campaign. He was re-elected at the general election of 1945 as a National Independent, but at the 1950 election his vote fell and he lost the seat to the Conservative candidate William Hicks Beach, coming third behind the Labour candidate.

Lipson was made an honorary Freeman of the Borough of Cheltenham in 1953. He continued to remain on both town and county councils until his death. He was also an enthusiastic supporter and a vice president of the Cheltenham YMCA.

A road on the Hesters Way housing estate in Cheltenham was named after him.

Parliament of the United Kingdom
Preceded by Sir Walter Preston	Member of Parliament for Cheltenham; 1937–1950	Succeeded by William Hicks Beach
