= Kenneth Preston (sailor) =

British sailor (1901–1995)

Personal information
- Full name: Sir Kenneth Huson Preston
- Nationality: British
- Born: 19 May 1901 Sevenoaks, England
- Died: 6 June 1995 (aged 94) Cirencester, England

Sport
- Sport: Sailing

Kenneth Huson Preston (19 May 1901 – 6 June 1995) was a British sailor. He competed at the 1936 Summer Olympics and the 1952 Summer Olympics.

== Early life and education ==
Preston was the eldest of three sons of the industrialist and politician Sir Walter Preston. His younger brother, Francis, was also an Olympic sailor. He was educated at Rugby School and Trinity College, Oxford, which he left without a degree, but where he played rugby, narrowly missing a blue due to an ankle injury.

== Career ==
Preston went into the family engineering business, and was a highly successful businessman. He was chairman of one of the family's acquisitions, Platt Brothers, which provided machinery for most of the Lancashire cotton industry. He was knighted in 1959.

== Sporting achievements ==
Preston competed in the 1936 and 1952 Olympic Games, and was regarded as a major figure in the sailing of "big boats" in the 1950s. All three Preston brothers were elected members of the Royal Yacht Squadron; Preston was a member for 72 years, and was vice-commodore from 1965 to 1971. He was also vice-commodore of the Royal Thames Yacht Club from 1953 to 1966.
