= Andrew Pennington =

British politician (1960–2000)

Andrew Pennington GM

Gloucestershire County Councillor
- In office 1985 – 28 January 2000
- Constituency: Hesters Way

Personal details
- Born: 1 February 1960 Warrington, Lancashire, England
- Died: 28 January 2000 (aged 39) Cheltenham, Gloucestershire, England
- Cause of death: Assassination by stabbing
- Party: Liberal Democrats (from 1988)
- Other political affiliations: Liberal (until 1988)
- Occupation: Politician
- Known for: Murder victim

Andrew James Pennington GM (1 February 1960 – 28 January 2000) was a British Liberal Democrat politician and a posthumous recipient of the George Medal in 2001. He was a Gloucestershire County Councillor from 1985 until his assassination in 2000.

== Political career ==
Pennington lived in Cheltenham, Gloucestershire. He was elected as a Liberal to Gloucestershire County Council in the 1985 election, defeating the incumbent Labour councillor in the Hesters Way division with a majority of 183 votes, obtaining 38.6% of the vote overall. He was re-elected as a Liberal Democrat in 1989 with 70.1% of the vote (a majority of 1,307 votes), and in 1993 held his seat with 73.3% of the vote (a majority of 1,272 votes). In his last election in 1997, he was re-elected with 65.2% of the vote (a majority of 2,071 votes).

== Murder ==
On 28 January 2000, Pennington was acting as an assistant to Nigel Jones, the Liberal Democrat Member of Parliament (MP) for Cheltenham, during Jones's constituency surgery. A constituent, Robert Ashman, whom Jones had been helping with legal disputes, attended the surgery and suddenly attacked Jones with a samurai sword. Pennington came to Jones's defence but was fatally injured; he was stabbed nine times from behind, with at least six of the wounds going all the way through his body. Jones survived the attack but suffered severe injuries to his hands. In 2003, Ashman was found guilty of the attempted murder of Jones and admitted to Pennington's manslaughter on the grounds of diminished responsibility.

== George Medal ==
Pennington was posthumously awarded the George Medal by Queen Elizabeth II on 30 October 2001. The citation reads:

For his actions in saving the life of a man who had been attacked by another man armed with a samurai sword.

On 28 January 2000, a member of parliament was holding a surgery for his constituents at his office in Cheltenham. Mr Andrew Pennington was assisting him when the receptionist showed a man into the office. The MP invited the man, who was wearing a full-length overcoat buttoned up to the neck, to sit down but the man declined and stood in front of the MP while he read a letter on which he had been asked to advise. A short conversation took place between them, whilst Mr Pennington looked on, but then the man began to talk nonsensically and without warning reached into his coat and drew out a long curved sword. He stood with the sword raised above his head in both hands, and as the MP stood up, lowered it, pointing the sword tip at the MP's midriff. At this point, Mr Pennington ran to the door of the office and called to the receptionist to get help.

Suddenly, the man lunged forward and thrust the sword at the MP who managed to deflect it with his left arm before grabbing the blade with both hands. The man tried to pull the sword from the MP's grip and he fell face down onto the sofa with the sword beneath him. The man fell on top of him and struggled to wrestle the sword free without success. Mr Pennington then hit the man from behind and dragged him off the MP, telling the MP to get away. The MP managed to escape and ran out of the office to summon help, but the man got hold of the sword again. A violent struggle then took place in which Mr Pennington tried to restrain the man but was stabbed repeatedly with the sword and was fatally wounded. Mr Pennington died shortly afterwards from his injuries and the man was later arrested.

== Trial and aftermath ==
In February 2001, the suspect in Pennington's killing, 49-year-old Robert Ashman of Lansdown Place, Cheltenham, was initially charged with the murder of Pennington and the attempted murder of Jones, but the jury at Bristol Crown Court decided that he was mentally unfit to stand trial. After a three-day hearing, they returned a unanimous verdict that Ashman did kill Pennington and a majority verdict that he injured Jones. Ashman was sent to a secure hospital for an indefinite amount of time. The High Court judge said at the time that Ashman was so disturbed that "she could not foresee a time when he would be safely released."

Ashman was released in July 2008 after psychiatrists determined that he was no longer dangerous. In 2009, he was living temporarily in Bristol and told authorities that he wished to move to Gloucester, close to where Jones and his family live. Lord Jones raised concerns with Justice Secretary Jack Straw about the proposal.
