= Charles de Ferrieres =

English politician and MP for Cheltenham

Baron de Ferrieres' Naturalization Act 1867
- Act of Parliament
- Parliament of the United Kingdom
- Long title: An Act to naturalize Charles Conrad Adolphus Du Bois de Ferrieres, commonly known as the Baron de Ferrieres, and to grant to and confer upon him all the Rights, Privileges, and Capacities of a natural-born Subject of Her Majesty the Queen.
- Citation: 30 & 31 Vict. c. 12 Pr.

Dates
- Royal assent: 12 August 1867

As a new MP in 1880

Baron Charles Conrad Adolphus du Bois de Ferrieres (2 October 1823 – 17 March 1908), was a Liberal member of parliament (MP) for Cheltenham from 1880 to 1885.

He was born in Tiel, Netherlands, to a family of Huguenot origin but his mother was English. He lived in England from infancy and spent 50 years in Cheltenham. He was naturalised in 1867 by a private act of Parliament, Baron de Ferrieres' Naturalization Act 1867 (30 & 31 Vict. c. 12 Pr.) and succeeded to his title as third Baron de Ferrieres in the Dutch peerage in the same year. The title was created by William I of the Netherlands for his grandfather in 1820.

Baron de Ferrieres was made Cheltenham's second Mayor in 1877, and he was elected at the 1880 general election as its Liberal MP, holding the seat until the 1885 general election.

He is best remembered for his gift to the town of the Art Gallery and paintings from his father's collection. He gave gifts to various churches in the town and county, especially stained-glass windows that were found in Cheltenham Parish Church, Gloucester Cathedral, Cheltenham College Chapel, and St Mary's, Chepstow. In recognition of his public munificence and private benefactions, as well as of his services to the community, he was made an honorary freeman of the borough in 1900.

He married Anne Sheepshanks in 1851 but had no children. His obituary stated that there was "scarcely a society or charitable institution in the town that [had] not benefited from his support". He is buried at St Peter's, Leckhampton, alongside his father where all five stained-glass windows are in his or his father's memory.

Parliament of the United Kingdom
Preceded by James Agg-Gardner	Member of Parliament for Cheltenham; 1880–1885	Succeeded by James Agg-Gardner
