= Alex Chalk =

British politician (born 1976)

The Right Honourable Alex Chalk KC
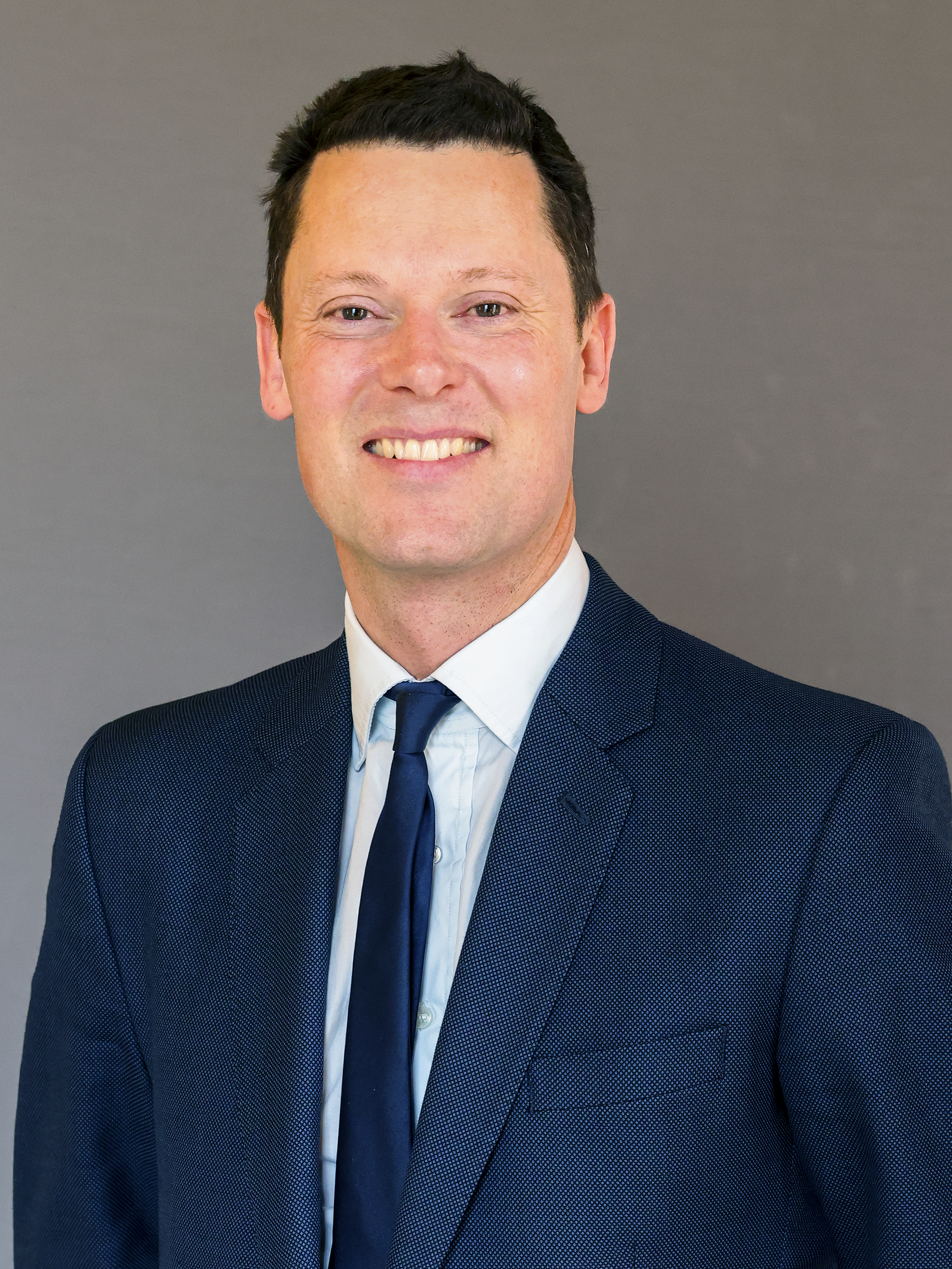
- Official portrait, 2023

Secretary of State for Justice; Lord Chancellor
- In office 21 April 2023 – 5 July 2024
- Prime Minister: Rishi Sunak
- Preceded by: Dominic Raab
- Succeeded by: Shabana Mahmood

Minister of State for Defence Procurement
- In office 26 October 2022 – 21 April 2023
- Prime Minister: Rishi Sunak
- Preceded by: Alec Shelbrooke
- Succeeded by: James Cartlidge

Solicitor General for England and Wales
- In office 16 September 2021 – 5 July 2022
- Prime Minister: Boris Johnson
- Preceded by: Michael Ellis
- Succeeded by: Edward Timpson

Minister of State for Prisons and Probation
- In office 2 March 2021 – 10 September 2021
- Prime Minister: Boris Johnson
- Preceded by: Lucy Frazer
- Succeeded by: Lucy Frazer

Parliamentary Under-Secretary of State for Justice
- In office 14 February 2020 – 16 September 2021
- Prime Minister: Boris Johnson
- Preceded by: Wendy Morton
- Succeeded by: James Cartlidge

Member of Parliament for Cheltenham
- In office 7 May 2015 – 30 May 2024
- Preceded by: Martin Horwood
- Succeeded by: Max Wilkinson

Personal details
- Born: Alexander John Gervase Chalk; 8 August 1976 (age 50) Cheltenham, Gloucestershire, England
- Party: Conservative
- Children: 3
- Education: Magdalen College, Oxford; City University London
- Website: www.alexchalk.com

Alexander John Gervase Chalk KC (born 8 August 1976) is a British politician and barrister. He served as Lord Chancellor and Secretary of State for Justice from April 2023 to July 2024.

A member of the Conservative Party, he served as the Member of Parliament (MP) for Cheltenham from 2015 to 2024. Chalk has previously served in other positions in the Ministry of Justice and Ministry of Defence, and as Solicitor General for England and Wales. Chalk lost his seat to the Liberal Democrats in the 2024 general election.

== Early life and career ==
Alexander Chalk was born in Cheltenham, Gloucestershire on 8 August 1976, to Gilbert John Chalk and Gillian Frances Audrey Blois. Chalk's mother and grandmother were magistrates. In a 2024 Leading interview, Chalk claimed that his grandfather married Elizabeth Talbot, a distant relation to the Earl of Shrewsbury. Chalk was privately educated, firstly at Windlesham House School, a prep school in Pulborough, West Sussex, and then at Winchester College, an independent boarding school in Winchester, Hampshire, where he served as head boy, a position also held by Rishi Sunak four years later. He then studied modern history at Magdalen College, Oxford.

Following graduation, Chalk obtained a Graduate Diploma in Law with distinction from the City University London, and qualified as a barrister from the Inns of Court School of Law. He was called to the bar by Middle Temple on 11 October 2001.

He prosecuted three members of a so-called 'Muslim Patrol' who were jailed at the Old Bailey for assault, affray and public order offences. Chalk also prosecuted a group of radical Sunni Muslims who were jailed for attacking a group of Shi'ite Muslims. Chalk prosecuted serious fraud cases, including a case against the socialite Edward Davenport, known as Fast Eddie, who was convicted in 2011 of being the ringmaster of a global fraud which saw 51 victims, including Elizabeth Emanuel, the dress designer, pay for "due diligence checks" to secure loans totalling £2 billion which were not genuinely on offer.

He also prosecuted rape and sexual assault cases, including against five men who lured two girls to a house and subjected them to a weekend of sex attacks; they were convicted. He has also advised and defended corporate clients, and prosecuted for HM Revenue and Customs and the Department of Business, Innovation and Skills. He represented journalists during the phone-hacking scandal. Chalk has provided counsel for the human rights lawyer Nasrin Sotoudeh, an Iranian prisoner of conscience.

== Political career ==
Chalk was first elected as a Conservative councillor for Shepherds Bush Green ward on Hammersmith and Fulham Council in May 2006. He went on to stand successfully in Addison ward in 2010, with Labour taking his former Shepherds Bush Green seat in the same election. He did not stand for re-election in 2014. Whilst on the Council he chaired the Planning Committee for four years.

At the 2015 general election, Chalk was elected as MP for Cheltenham with 46.1% of the vote and a majority of 6,516.

Chalk was among several Conservative candidates from the 2015 general election under investigation for breaking local campaign spending limits. This related to the use of "Battle Buses" during his election campaign, the costs of which were not declared by Chalk's campaign but were instead paid for by the Conservatives' national headquarters. Had the costs been declared the strict local spending limit would have been exceeded by £1,500. Gloucestershire Constabulary confirmed it had received a complaint in 2016 and he was under investigation at the time. Following a lengthy investigation, the Crown Prosecution Service said it would take no further action against any Conservative candidates or party official, including Alex Chalk.

From June 2015 to January 2019, Chalk was a member of the Justice Select Committee, which scrutinises the government's decisions relating to the justice system. In addition to his role on the Justice Select Committee, Chalk was Chair of the All Party Parliamentary Group (APPG) on Pro Bono and Co- Chair of the APPG on Cycling. He was also the secretary of the APPG on Public Legal Education and the APPG for Highways and the vice chair of the APPG on Lyme Disease.

Chalk alongside other MPs, including Richard Graham from the neighbouring Gloucester constituency, tabled a debate in parliament about stalking and sponsored a private member's bill, in order to raise the maximum sentence for stalking from five to ten years. An amendment to the Policing and Crime Act 2017 raised the maximum sentence for stalking to ten years.

In December 2015, Chalk voted for UK airstrikes against Islamic State of Iraq and the Levant in Syria.

In April 2016, he voted against a plan for Britain to accept 3,000 unaccompanied Syrian child refugees who had travelled to Europe. Following the vote, Chalk published his response to constituents explaining the context of the vote and stated that it was "one of the toughest votes in [his] time in Parliament".

Chalk supported remaining within the European Union in the 2016 Brexit referendum. He supported the government by voting to trigger Article 50, which formally began the process of Britain's exit from the European Union, along with a majority of cross-party MPs, as a way of respecting the referendum result.

In March 2017, the Electoral Commission fined the Conservative Party £70,000 for failing accurately to report campaign spending. In May 2017, the Crown Prosecution Service concluded its investigations into the allegations and determined that no Conservative Party candidates or officials would face charges.

In May 2017, Liberal Democrats candidate Martin Horwood said that Chalk was being actively supported by members of pro-hunting organisations Vale of White Horse Hunt, North Cotswold Hunt and Vote-OK, and questioned whether Chalk was concealing his position on fox hunting. Chalk stated: "This is another misleading and increasingly desperate attack by the Lib Dems, who are seeing their support crater. Contrary to his claims, I have made clear that I would not accept support from any hunt or from Vote OK for the election. That remains my position."

Chalk was re-elected as MP for Cheltenham at the snap 2017 general election with an increased vote share of 46.7% and a decreased majority of 2,569.

In May 2018, prompted by his concerns about a rise in child and adolescent mental health problems in his constituency, Chalk led a Parliamentary inquiry, together with the Children's Society and Young Minds charities, into the impact of social media and cyber bullying on young people's mental health. Following the launch of the report, it was referenced in the Government's Response to the Internet Safety Strategy Green Paper (published May 2018).

In 2018, Chalk was appointed Parliamentary Private Secretary (PPS) to the Department of Education. He was then appointed PPS to the Secretary of State for Health and Social Care later in 2018, and then in May 2019 became PPS to the new Secretary of State for Defence Penny Mordaunt.

Chalk voiced concerns relating to leaving the EU without a deal, but discouraged a People's Vote rally in Cheltenham to fight against a "No Deal Brexit". Chalk consistently argued that the only way to avoid No Deal and to respect the result of the referendum was to vote for a deal. Chalk advocated a "moderate, compromise deal" with cross-party colleagues. Since 2019 he consistently voted in Parliament to support government legislation to leave the EU.

At the 2019 general election, Chalk was again re-elected with an increased vote share of 48% and a decreased majority of 981.

In the 2024 General Election Chalk lost his seat to Liberal Democrat Max Wilkinson, who had a majority of 7,210 votes representing a 12.4% swing away from the Conservatives to the Liberal Democrats.

== Ministerial career ==
=== Parliamentary Under-Secretary of State at the Ministry of Justice ===
In February 2020, Chalk was appointed as Parliamentary Under-Secretary of State at the Ministry of Justice.

In June 2020, Chalk took the Divorce, Dissolution and Separation Bill through Parliament which spares divorcing couples from having to apportion blame for the breakdown of their marriage.

In March 2021, Chalk announced measures to protect young people who fall victim to sexual predators working as sports coaches and faith leaders. Alongside his Ministerial colleagues at the Ministry of Justice, Chalk tabled new laws in the Police, Crime, Sentencing and Courts Bill to prohibit those in a position of trust from engaging in sexual activity with a child in their care.

=== Prisons and Probation Minister ===
In March 2021, Chalk was temporarily appointed as Prisons and Probation Minister whilst his predecessor, Lucy Frazer KC MP, was reappointed as Solicitor General when Suella Braverman MP was designated as a Minister on Leave.

In May 2021, it was reported by The Times that Chalk had told prison officials that they "must stop calling inmates residents, clients or supervised individuals because it creates the wrong impression of criminals". Chalk reportedly told civil servants, prison staff, governors and probation officers that they should stick to using the word prisoner as the increasing use of alternative language to refer to and address prisoners was "sending mixed messages about how the state and wider society perceived serious criminals."

Also in May 2021, Chalk announced that new prisons will be 'net zero' in future, with the four new prisons being built in England using heat pumps, efficient lighting systems and thousands of solar panels, to reduce energy demand by half and cut carbon emissions by at least 85% compared to prisons already under construction. Chalk also announced that charities and companies which help rehabilitate offenders had been awarded around £200 million of Government funding to provide support services that help reduce reoffending, such as employment and housing advice.

In June 2021, Chalk announced that 1,000 new trainee probation officers had been recruited to bolster the work the Probation Service does. He also announced an overhaul to the unpaid work that offenders are ordered to do as part of community service.

In July 2021, Chalk announced a new scheme to provide temporary, basic accommodation to prison leavers for twelve weeks in an attempt to cut crime by reducing the number of prison leavers ending up homeless so that they have the foundation to get a job and access treatment for addictions.

In August 2021, Chalk announced that thousands more solar panels will be fitted to prisons to help cut carbon emissions and to save taxpayers' money. The installations were expected to cut more than 1,300 tonnes of carbon from the Earth's atmosphere and provide 20% of each prison's electricity. It was estimated that this would save £800,000 of taxpayers' money a year.

Also in August 2021, the Ministry of Justice announced the expansion of the Clink Kitchens Scheme to a further 25 prisons by the end of the year, giving offenders the chance to work in professionally-run prison kitchens with the intention of turning them away from a life of crime. In the programme prisoners train in professionally-run prison kitchens for up to 35 hours a week, preparing and cooking thousands of meals daily, while working towards professional qualifications which will help them find employment after release.

=== HM Solicitor General for England and Wales ===
On 16 September 2021, Chalk was appointed Her Majesty's Solicitor General for England and Wales. After his appointment, he became a Queen's Counsel and was officially sworn in on 23 September 2021.

As Solicitor General, Chalk sought to ensure that criminals receive custodial sentences that appropriately reflect the nature of their crimes. He has referred a significant number of cases to the Court of Appeal under the unduly lenient sentence scheme, securing enhanced sentences against more than 38 serious offenders in his first eight months in the role. On average, these offenders have been handed down an enhanced sentence that is 56 percent longer than the original sentence they received. These offenders include Milad Rouf, who threw acid in the face of a former partner, and Christopher Appleby, who sexually abused three girls over a period of 15 years.

In January 2021, a man who had previously been given a suspended sentence having been asked to read improving books was sentenced to an immediate prison term after Chalk personally presented the case on behalf of the Government at the Court of Appeal.

Ben John, aged 22, was in possession of tens of thousands of politically extreme and far-right documents and files, including white nationalist and anti-Semitic materials. He was also found to own a copy of The Anarchist Cookbook, a widely available book containing instructions for the manufacture of explosives and rudimentary weapons. In August 2021, John was given a suspended sentence. Following Chalk's presentation in court, the Court of Appeal increased John's sentence to 2 years' imprisonment with a 1 year licence period.

In March 2021, Chay Bowskill saw his sentence for kidnapping, coercive control and perverting the course of justice increased from 7½ years to 12 years following Chalk's decision to refer the case to the Court of Appeal.

Chalk resigned as Solicitor General on 5 July 2022, citing the Owen Paterson scandal, Partygate and the Chris Pincher scandal.

=== Minister of State in the Ministry of Defence ===
From October 2022 to April 2023, Chalk was Minister of State in the Ministry of Defence.

=== Lord Chancellor and Secretary of State for Justice ===
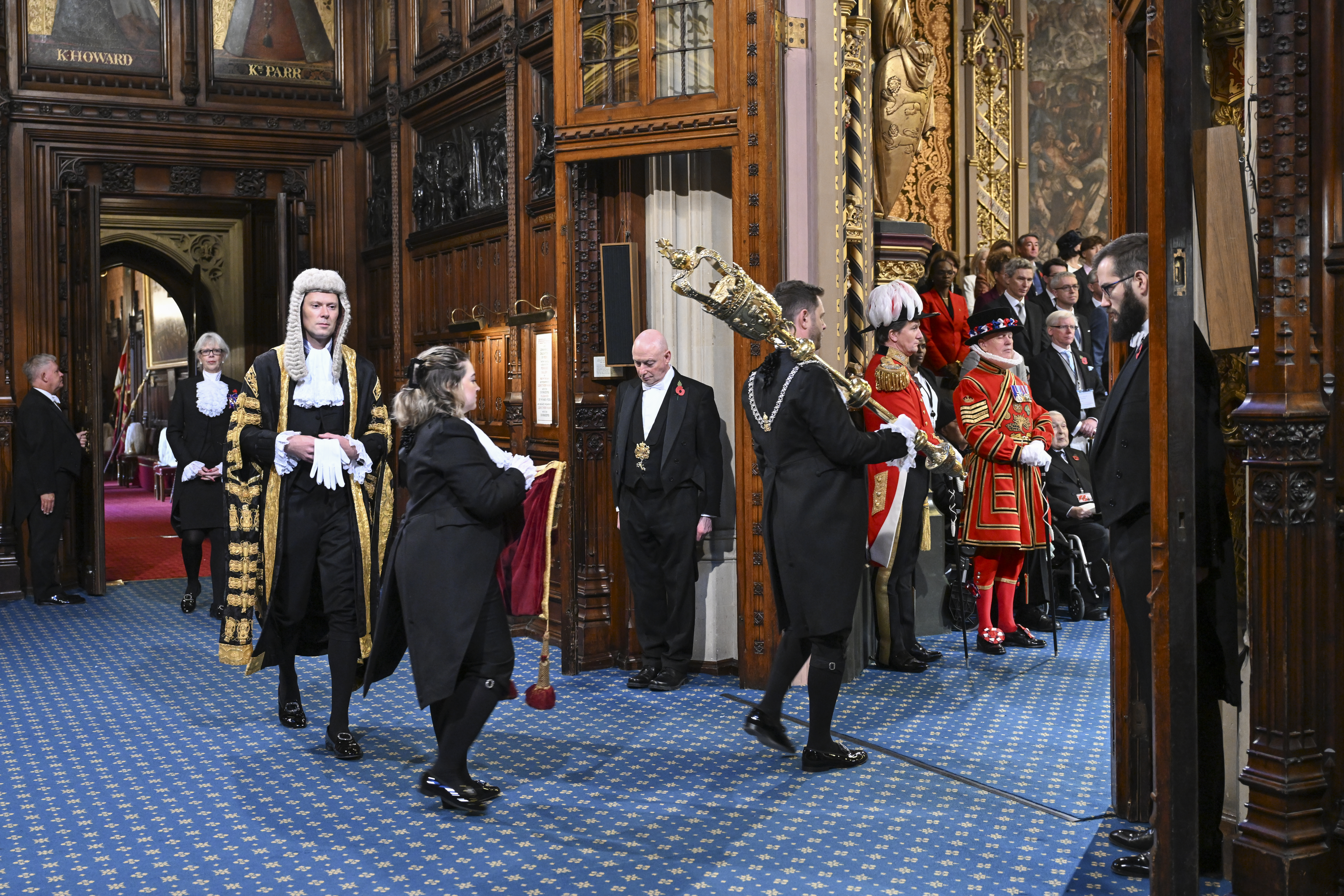
Chalk (left, in court dress) at the State Opening of Parliament, 2023

On 21 April 2023, Chalk was named to succeed Dominic Raab as Secretary of State for Justice and Lord Chancellor. King Charles III appointed him to those offices at a meeting of the Privy Council on 26 April 2023, at which he was also sworn of the council.

On 24 August 2023, Chalk ordered an inquiry into the wrongful conviction of Andrew Malkinson, stating that he "suffered an atrocious miscarriage of justice and he deserves thorough and honest answers as to how and why it took so long to uncover".

== Post-parliamentary career ==
Following his defeat at the 2024 General Election, Chalk was employed as a Partner at the multinational law firm Jones Day.

== Personal life ==
Chalk is married, with three children, and lives in the Charlton Park ward in Charlton Kings, Cheltenham.

Parliament of the United Kingdom
Preceded by Martin Horwood	Member of Parliament for Cheltenham; 2015–2024	Succeeded by Max Wilkinson
Political offices
Preceded by Dominic Raab	Secretary of State for Justice; 2023–2024	Succeeded by Shabana Mahmood
Preceded by Dominic Raab	Lord High Chancellor of Great Britain; 2023–2024	Succeeded by Shabana Mahmood
