= Francis Preston (sailor) =

British sailor (1913–1975)

Personal information
- Full name: Francis Richard Walter Preston
- Nationality: British
- Born: 6 June 1913 Marylebone, England
- Died: 7 February 1975 (aged 61) Chichester, England

Sport
- Sport: Sailing

Francis Richard Walter Preston (6 June 1913 – 7 February 1975) was a British sailor. He competed in the 8 Metre event at the 1936 Summer Olympics.

== Early life ==
Preston was the youngest of three sons of the industrialist and politician Sir Walter Preston. His eldest brother, Kenneth, was also an Olympic sailor. He was educated at Rugby School and Trinity College, Oxford.

Preston was a textile engineer, working for the family company.

== Sporting achievements ==
Having first sailed in 8-metre international events on the Solent aged 17, with his brother Bryan, the Prestons soon met with success, winning regattas. All three Preston brothers were elected members of the Royal Yacht Squadron. In the 1936 Summer Olympics, Preston was one of the six crew members aboard the Saskia, coming in in sixth place.
