= John Saunders (English judge) =

Retired English judge (born 1949)

Sir John Henry Boulton Saunders (born 15 March 1949), formerly styled The Hon. Mr Justice Saunders, is a retired High Court Judge of the King's Bench Division.

Saunders was called to the bar in 1972 and acted as a prosecutor for the Department of Health and Social Security throughout the 1980s. He was a Recorder between 1990 and 2004 and became a Queen's Counsel in 1991.

In 2004, Saunders was appointed a full-time circuit judge as well as taking the honorary appointment of Recorder of Birmingham (the most senior judge at Birmingham Crown Court) and in April 2007 was appointed to the High Court bench and received the customary knighthood.

== Notable cases ==
=== Parliamentary expenses scandal ===
In 2010–11, Saunders presided over the trials and sentencing of several former MPs and peers in connection with the Parliamentary expenses scandal. He gave the judgment at first instance which was affirmed in both the Court of Appeal and Supreme Court in R v Chaytor and passed sentences in excess of 12 months' imprisonment on MPs David Chaytor, Elliot Morley, Jim Devine and Eric Illsley and on Tory peers Lord Taylor of Warwick and Lord Hanningfield. During these cases he was noted for strongly criticising the leaders of all three major parties for attacking the defendant MPs' use of legal aid and attempted reliance upon Parliamentary privilege during the 2010 election campaign, and for requiring Lord Sugar to remove a tweet commenting on the ongoing proceedings.

=== 2011 riots ===
On 17 April 2012, Saunders sentenced Darrel Desuze to detention for a term of eight years for the manslaughter of Richard Mannington Bowes during the 2011 England riots and his mother Lavinia Desuze to imprisonment for eighteen months for perverting the course of justice after she destroyed clothing worn by her son on the day of the offence.

=== Newspaper hacking ===
In late 2013 and the first half of 2014, Saunders was the judge in charge of the high-profile 'hacking trial' that arose out of the News International phone hacking scandal. At the start of the trial, Saunders noted that "The defendants are on trial but British justice is also on trial", and cautioned against the significant comment on the case that had been made online:

There has been a great deal of publicity about this case, perhaps an unprecedented amount. The internet is generally not controlled and often fuelled by opinion and speculation, a great deal of information is imparted and received by people through Facebook and Twitter. A significant amount of publicity has been inaccurate and misleading ... offensive and demeaning to some of the defendants. A lot is ill-informed and most of it is abusive.

Towards the end of the trial, Saunders issued a public request for public figures, in particular politicians, to avoid commenting on the trial until it had reached its conclusion. His intervention came after Prime Minister David Cameron had issued a public apology for employing Andy Coulson as his director of communications following his being found guilty of conspiracy to hack phones, but while the jury were still considering other verdicts against Coulson and other defendants.

=== Manchester Arena Inquiry ===
In 2019 Saunders was the presiding coroner over the deaths caused by the Manchester Arena bombing. Following his recommendation, the Home Secretary established a public inquiry into the incident under his chairmanship. The first report was issued on 17 June 2021, and the second report was issued on 2 February 2023.
