= James Agg-Gardner =

English brewery-owner and politician

James Agg-Gardner

Sir James Tynte Agg-Gardner PC JP (25 November 1846 in Cheltenham – 9 August 1928 in Carlton Club) was an English brewery-owner and Conservative Party politician from Cheltenham in Gloucestershire. An early supporter of women's suffrage, he was Member of Parliament (MP) for the Cheltenham constituency for four separate periods between 1874 and 1928, serving a total of 39 years in Parliament in which he made only two speeches in the House of Commons.

== Early life ==
He was born in Cheltenham, where his father James Agg-Gardner, Senior (1804–58) had purchased the lordship of the manor in 1843. After his father's death, James Junior was brought up as a ward of court, and educated at Harrow School and then privately. He matriculated to Trinity College, Cambridge, but instead of starting his studies he contested the 1868 general election in Cheltenham, but failed to win the seat. He then studied law, and in 1873 he was called to the bar at the Middle Temple. However, he never practised law, concentrating instead on his business interests and his political career. He was a magistrate from 1875.

== Political career ==
Agg-Gardner was first elected as Cheltenham's MP at the 1874 general election, but was defeated at the 1880 general election. He was re-elected in 1885 and held the seat until he stood down at the 1895 election, possibly for reasons related to his homosexuality. He was returned unopposed at the 1900 general election, but was defeated in the 1906 general election. He did not stand again until a by-election in April 1911, after which he held the seat until death in 1928.

In the House of Commons chamber, he was an infrequent speaker, but served for most of his career on the Commons Kitchen Committee, which he chaired from 1917. In that role, he supervised the daily tea on the terrace, and was known affectionately as the "Minister of the Interior". He sponsored the parliamentary bill which conferred borough status on Cheltenham, and 1896 was made the first freeman of the borough. He also introduced bills on fire escapes (1891) and hire purchase (1928). Active in his constituency, he founded the Cheltenham Chamber of Commerce in 1902, and was summarily elected to be its first President.

He was knighted in 1916, and appointed as a Privy Councillor in 1924. By the time of his death in 1928, aged 81, he was the oldest serving Member of Parliament, having sat with ten Prime Ministers from Disraeli to Baldwin. However, because he had not been an MP continuously, he did not hold the title of Father of the House. Agg-Gardner was known to be gay.

== Wine ==
Christie's has a library of its old auction catalogues, and many of the wine auctions in the first three decades of the twentieth century show bidding by "Agg-Gardner", sometimes successful. He was also mentioned by André L. Simon in an article titled The Soliloquy of a Bibulous Bibliophile:

Is there anybody anywhere today, I sometimes wonder, who had the opportunities which were mine, during three score and ten years of my adult life, to enjoy wonderful wines, the like of which the post-wars generations will never know, and the privilege to enjoy them with such wonderful friends? I doubt it. One of my oldest friends–he was born in 1847–was Sir James Agg-Gardner, a little man and a great lover of wine: he was M.P. for Cheltenham, and Chairman of the Kitchen Committee of the House of Commons; he was one of a few friends who lunched with me at my old Mark Lane headquarters, in 1918, to celebrate my return to civilian life. There were still, on that day, four magnums of Cockburn 1847 in the cellar; we had one of them and it really was magnificent! We were on the eve of a General Election and we all drank good luck to Sir James in the wine of his own vintage. I promised him, somewhat rashly, another magnum of 1847 Cockburn, should he be re-elected. He was re-elected, of course, not only that year, but twice again during the next twelve months: it took three elections in two years to get a working majority, and this was why and how my last three magnums of Cockburn 1847 went in two years! No regrets: they were at their best and could not possibly have been any better had they been kept any longer.

== Publications ==
- Agg-Gardner, Sir James (1927). Some Parliamentary Recollections by the Right Honourable Sir James Agg-Gardner, PC, MP. London: E. J. Burrow. British Library shelfmark: 010855.bb.54.

== Notes ==
Parliament of the United Kingdom
| Preceded by Henry Samuelson | Member of Parliament for Cheltenham; 1874–1880 | Succeeded by Charles de Ferrieres |
| Preceded by Charles de Ferrieres | Member of Parliament for Cheltenham; 1885–1895 | Succeeded by Francis Shirley Russell |
| Preceded by Francis Shirley Russell | Member of Parliament for Cheltenham; 1900–1906 | Succeeded by John Sears |
| Preceded by Richard Mathias | Member of Parliament for Cheltenham; 1911–1928 | Succeeded by Sir Walter Preston |
| Preceded by Sir Henry Craik | Oldest Member of Parliament; 1927–1928 | Succeeded by T. P. O'Connor |
