= Charles Irving (politician) =

British politician (1924–1995)

Sir Charles Irving

Member of Parliament for Cheltenham
- In office 10 October 1974 – 16 March 1992
- Preceded by: Douglas Dodds-Parker
- Succeeded by: Nigel Jones

Personal details
- Born: 4 May 1924
- Died: 30 March 1995 (aged 70)
- Party: Conservative

Sir Charles Graham Irving (4 May 1924 – 30 March 1995) was a British Conservative Member of Parliament for Cheltenham.

== Early life ==
Irving was born into a hotel-owning family in Cheltenham, its flagship being the Irving Hotel on the High Street, of which he became chairman in 1949.

He was educated at Glengarth School, in Cheltenham, and Lucton, near Hereford, at both of which "he evinced no academic bent". When he left school during World War II he tried to join the Army but was turned down on the grounds of being "insufficiently robust". He served in the Home Guard, but was "a good deal less than successful in those ranks, the highlight of his career being the accidental stabbing of a colleague in the hindquarters with a bayonet".

== Political career ==
His political career began in 1947 when he was elected to Cheltenham Borough Council. The following year he was elected to Gloucestershire County Council. He was Mayor of Cheltenham 1958–1960 and again 1971–1972.

Having unsuccessfully contested Bilston in 1970 and Kingswood in February 1974, he became an MP in October 1974 at his third attempt and represented Cheltenham until his retirement in 1992. During this time he was chairman of the Select Committee on Catering from 1979 until 1992 and a member of the All Party Mental Health Committee 1979–1992. Irving was knighted in 1990.

Irving was not afraid to stand up to the prime minister of the day, Margaret Thatcher, particularly over the decision to de-unionise Government Communications Headquarters (GCHQ) a body located within his Cheltenham constituency, but he was also a great admirer of Thatcher: from the day she was elected leader of the Conservative Party until she resigned as Prime Minister fifteen years later, Irving paid to have fresh flowers delivered to her.

== Personal life ==
According to both Martin Horwood, the former Lib Dem MP for Cheltenham and Michael McManus's book, Tory Pride and Prejudice: the Conservative Party and Homosexual Law Reform, Irving was gay and he is reported to have offered a steady stream of advice to the Conservative Campaign for Homosexual Equality.

Parliament of the United Kingdom
Preceded by Douglas Dodds-Parker	Member of Parliament for Cheltenham; October 1974–1992	Succeeded by Nigel Jones
