= Walter Preston (British politician) =

British politician (1875–1946)

Sir Walter Reuben Preston (20 September 1875 – 6 July 1946) was a Conservative Party politician in the United Kingdom, serving as MP for the Mile End from 1918 to 1923, and Cheltenham from 1928 to his resignation in 1937.

== Early life and education ==
Preston was son of Reuben Thomas Preston, of Hayes Court, Kent. The Preston family had co-founded the engineering company J. Stone & Co. He was educated at Bedford School.

== Politics ==
At the 1918 general election, he was elected as Member of Parliament (MP) for the Mile End constituency in the East End of London. He lost the seat at the 1923 general election to the Labour Party candidate John Scurr.

He returned to Parliament at a by-election in September 1928 for the Cheltenham constituency, and held the seat until he resigned from the House of Commons in 1937. He was made a Knight Bachelor.

== Engineering work ==
Involved in the family business, Walter Reuben Preston was an engineer, with 35 patents, some of which were obtained jointly with well-known locomotive engineers such as Richard Deeley.

== Personal life ==
On 18 April 1900, Preston married Ella Margaret (born 7 September 1877, died 28 January 1963), daughter of Huson Morris, of Hayes, Kent. They had three sons, Kenneth Huson Preston, Bryan Wentworth Preston, and Francis Richard Walter Preston, all three devoted yachtsmen, the eldest and youngest at the Olympics. They lived at 77, St James's Court, Buckingham Gate, London S.W.1., and at Tetbury, Gloucestershire.

There are memorial inscriptions to both at Holy Trinity Church, Long Newnton, near Tetbury, Gloucestershire.

Parliament of the United Kingdom
Preceded by Warwick Brookes	Member of Parliament for Mile End; 1918–1923	Succeeded by John Scurr
Preceded by Sir James Agg-Gardner	Member of Parliament for Cheltenham; 1928–1937	Succeeded by Daniel Lipson
