= All-Party Parliamentary Group for Tribal Peoples =

Former UK parliamentary group

The All-Party Parliamentary Group for Tribal Peoples was a group in the UK Parliament, chaired by Martin Horwood MP, that was founded in 2007. Its stated aim was to "raise parliamentary and public awareness of tribal peoples".

During its operation, the Group met two or three times a year and one of its main objectives is to press for ratification of ILO Convention 169 on the rights of indigenous and tribal peoples. The British international indigenous rights organization Survival International worked as its secretariat, and also funded occasional group receptions and events.

The Chair, Martin Horwood MP, lost his seat in the 2015 general election and the group was not reformed during the new parliamentary session.

== See also ==
- All-Party Parliamentary Group
- Indigenous rights
