= Cheltenham (constituency) =

Parliamentary constituency in the United Kingdom, 1832 onwards

Coordinates: 51.890°N 2.078°W

- Borough constituency for the House of Commons
- Interactive map of boundaries from 2024
- Boundary of Cheltenham in South West England
- County: Gloucestershire
- Population: 104,867 (2011 census)
- Electorate: 75,292 (2023)
- Major settlements: Cheltenham

Current constituency
- Created: 1832
- Member of Parliament: Max Wilkinson (Liberal Democrats)
- Seats: One
- Created from: Gloucestershire

Cheltenham (/ˈtʃɛltənəm/ CHELT-ən-əm) is a constituency (Note: A borough constituency (for the purposes of election expenses and type of returning officer)) in Gloucestershire represented in the House of Commons of the UK Parliament since 1832. As with all constituencies, it elects one Member of Parliament (MP) by the first past the post system of election at least every five years. Since 2024, its MP has been Max Wilkinson of the Liberal Democrats.

== Boundaries and boundary changes ==
The constituency is based on the town of Cheltenham in Gloucestershire, covering a different, slightly smaller area than the borough of the same name. It is bordered by the Tewkesbury and North Cotswolds seats.

1885–1918: The existing parliamentary borough, and so much of the parish of Charlton Kings as lay to the north of the railway from Cheltenham to Banbury.

1918–1950: The Municipal Borough of Cheltenham and the Urban District of Charlton Kings.

1950–1983: As 1918 but with redrawn boundaries.

1983–1997: The Borough of Cheltenham, and the Borough of Tewkesbury wards of Leckhampton with Up Hatherley, Prestbury St Mary's, and Prestbury St Nicolas.

Leckhampton, Up Hatherley and Prestbury were added to the seat from the Cirencester and Tewkesbury constituency; they had previously been in the abolished Cheltenham Rural District.

1997–2010: The Borough of Cheltenham wards of All Saints, Charlton Kings, College, Hatherley and The Reddings, Hesters Way, Lansdown, Park, Pittville, St Mark's, St Paul's, and St Peter's.

Leckhampton, Up Hatherley and Prestbury were transferred to the new Tewkesbury constituency; they had been incorporated into the redrawn Borough of Cheltenham in 1991.

2010–2024: The Borough of Cheltenham wards of All Saints, Battledown, Benhall and The Reddings^{1}, Charlton Kings, Charlton Park, College, Hesters Way, Lansdown, Leckhampton, Oakley, Park, Pittville, St Mark's, St Paul's, St Peter's, Springbank, Up Hatherley, and Warden Hill.

Leckhampton and Up Hatherley were transferred back from the Tewkesbury constituency.

2024–present: As above minus Springbank ward.

^{1} Renamed Benhall, The Reddings & Fiddler's Green by a local government boundary review which became effective in May 2024.

Reduced to bring the electorate within the permitted range by transferring the Springbank ward to the Tewkesbury constituency.

== History ==
Cheltenham borough constituency was created in the Great Reform Act 1832 and has returned ten Liberals (or Liberal Democrats) and ten Conservatives to Parliament since that time, along with one independent.

A Conservative served the constituency from 1950 until 1992. The Conservatives' campaign in the 1992 general election following the Poll Tax riots saw a local party member make racist remarks about their own candidate, John Taylor, who was of Afro-Caribbean descent. Taylor lost the election to Nigel Jones of the Liberal Democrats.

In 2000, Jones was nearly murdered in a horrific incident at one of his MP's surgeries; a man attacked him and an assistant with a samurai sword. His colleague Andrew Pennington was killed in the attack. Jones was made a life peer in 2005.

The Liberal Democrats held Cheltenham in the 2005 election when Martin Horwood won the election, and again in 2010, but lost when Conservative Alex Chalk retook the seat in 2015. Chalk held on to the seat in 2017 and 2019, albeit with small majorities, but lost to Max Wilkinson when the Liberal Democrats regained the seat at the 2024 general election.

== Constituency profile ==
The constituency is located in Gloucestershire and covers most of the large town of Cheltenham. Cheltenham is a historic spa town and popular tourist location; it is known for its Regency architecture, its location at the edge of the Cotswolds and its regular cultural events including the literature, jazz and horse racing festivals. GCHQ, the United Kingdom's intelligence agency, is headquartered in the town, and GE Aerospace is also a large employer, meaning the town has a high proportion of skilled professionals. The town contains some deprivation and council housing in Whaddon and Hesters Way, however large parts of the town fall within the 10% least-deprived areas in England.

Compared to national averages, residents are wealthy and well-educated. White people make up 91% of the population. At the local council level (district and county), almost all of the town's seats are represented by Liberal Democrats. Voters in Cheltenham showed strong support for remaining in the European Union in the 2016 referendum, an estimated 58% voted to remain compared to 48% nationally.

== Members of Parliament ==
Election	Member	Party	Notes
1832	Hon. Craven Berkeley	Whig	Son of the 5th Earl of Berkeley
1847	Sir Willoughby Jones	Conservative	Unseated on petition
1848, June by-election	Hon. Craven Berkeley	Whig	Unseated on petition
1848, September by-election	Grenville Berkeley	Whig	
1852	Hon. Craven Berkeley	Whig	Died 1855
1855 by-election	Grenville Berkeley	Whig	
1856 by-election	Francis Berkeley	Whig	Later 2nd Baron FitzHardinge
1859	Francis Berkeley	Liberal	Later 2nd Baron FitzHardinge
1865	Charles Schreiber	Conservative	
1868	Henry Samuelson	Liberal	
1874	James Agg-Gardner	Conservative	
1880	Charles de Ferrieres	Liberal	
1885	James Agg-Gardner	Conservative	
1895	Francis Shirley Russell	Conservative	
1900	James Agg-Gardner	Conservative	
1906	John Sears	Liberal	
1910, January	Vere Ponsonby	Conservative	Later 9th Earl of Bessborough
1910, December	Richard Mathias	Liberal	Unseated on petition
1911 by-election	Sir James Agg-Gardner	Conservative	Knighted in 1916
1928 by-election	Sir Walter Preston	Conservative	
1937 by-election	Daniel Lipson	Independent Conservative	
1945	Daniel Lipson	Independent	
1950	W. W. Hicks Beach	Conservative	
1964	Sir Douglas Dodds-Parker	Conservative	
Oct 1974	Charles Irving	Conservative	
1992	Nigel Jones	Liberal Democrats	Later a life peer as Baron Jones of Cheltenham
2005	Martin Horwood	Liberal Democrats	
2015	Alex Chalk	Conservative	
2024	Max Wilkinson	Liberal Democrats	

== Elections ==
=== Elections in the 2020s ===
General election 2024: Cheltenham
Party	Candidate	Votes	%	±%
Liberal Democrats	Max Wilkinson	25,076	50.6	+4.6
Conservative	Alex Chalk	17,866	36.1	–12.4
Green	Daniel Wilson	3,160	6.4	N/A
Labour	Lara Chaplin	2,665	5.4	+0.6
Independent	Daud McDonald	775	1.6	N/A
Majority		7,210	14.5	N/A
Turnout		49,542	65.1	–10.4
Registered electors		76,143		
Liberal Democrats gain from Conservative		Swing	▲8.5	

=== Elections in the 2010s ===
2019 notional result
Party	Vote	%
Conservative	27,563	48.5
Liberal Democrats	26,142	46.0
Labour	2,733	4.8
Others	445	0.8
Turnout	56,883	75.5
Electorate	75,292	

In 2019, Cheltenham was one of five English constituencies, the others being Esher and Walton, Westmorland and Lonsdale, Winchester and East Devon, where Labour failed to obtain over 5% of the vote and lost their deposit.

General election 2019: Cheltenham
Party	Candidate	Votes	%	±%
Conservative	Alex Chalk	28,486	48.0	+1.3
Liberal Democrats	Max Wilkinson	27,505	46.3	+4.1
Labour	George Penny	2,921	4.9	–4.6
Monster Raving Loony	George Ridgeon	445	0.7	N/A
Majority		981	1.7	–2.8
Turnout		59,357	73.2	+0.9
Registered electors		81,043		+2.7
Conservative hold		Swing	–1.3	

General election 2017: Cheltenham
Party	Candidate	Votes	%	±%
Conservative	Alex Chalk	26,615	46.7	+0.6
Liberal Democrats	Martin Horwood	24,046	42.2	+8.2
Labour	Keith White	5,408	9.5	+2.2
Green	Adam Van Coevorden	943	1.7	–3.3
Majority		2,569	4.5	–7.6
Turnout		57,012	72.3	+2.8
Registered electors		78,878		+2.1
Conservative hold		Swing	–3.8	

General election 2015: Cheltenham
Party	Candidate	Votes	%	±%
Conservative	Alex Chalk	24,790	46.1	+4.9
Liberal Democrats	Martin Horwood	18,274	34.0	–16.5
Labour	Paul Gilbert	3,902	7.3	+2.2
UKIP	Christina Simmonds	3,808	7.1	+4.8
Green	Adam Van Coevorden	2,689	5.0	N/A
Independent	Richard Lupson-Darnell	272	0.5	N/A
Majority		6,516	12.1	N/A
Turnout		53,735	69.5	+2.5
Registered electors		77,287		–2.2
Conservative gain from Liberal Democrats		Swing	+10.7	

General election 2010: Cheltenham
Party	Candidate	Votes	%	±%
Liberal Democrats	Martin Horwood	26,659	50.5	+11.1
Conservative	Mark Coote	21,739	41.2	+2.4
Labour	James Green	2,703	5.1	–6.7
UKIP	Peter Bowman	1,192	2.3	+1.0
Monster Raving Loony	Kenneth Hanks	493	0.9	N/A
Majority		4,920	9.3	+8.7
Turnout		52,786	67.0	+4.4
Registered electors		78,998		+3.0
Liberal Democrats hold		Swing	+4.3	

=== Elections in the 2000s ===
General election 2005: Cheltenham
Party	Candidate	Votes	%	±%
Liberal Democrats	Martin Horwood	18,122	41.5	–6.2
Conservative	Vanessa Gearson	15,819	36.3	+1.1
Labour	Chris Evans	4,988	11.4	–0.6
Independent	Robert Hodges	2,651	6.1	N/A
Green	Keith Bessant	908	2.1	+0.3
UKIP	Niall Warry	608	1.4	+0.2
Monster Raving Loony	Kenneth Hanks	525	1.2	0.0
Majority		2,303	5.2	−7.3
Turnout		43,621	61.0	–0.9
Registered electors		71,541		+5.9
Liberal Democrats hold		Swing	–3.6	

General election 2001: Cheltenham
Party	Candidate	Votes	%	±%
Liberal Democrats	Nigel Jones	19,970	47.7	–1.8
Conservative	Rob Garnham	14,715	35.2	–1.0
Labour	Andrew Erlam	5,041	12.0	+1.9
Green	Keith Bessant	735	1.8	N/A
Monster Raving Loony	Kenneth Hanks	513	1.2	+0.4
UKIP	James Carver	482	1.2	+0.6
ProLife Alliance	Anthony Gates	272	0.7	+0.2
Independent	Roger Everest	107	0.3	N/A
Majority		5,255	12.5	–0.8
Turnout		41,835	61.9	–12.1
Registered electors		67,563		–0.6
Liberal Democrats hold		Swing	–0.3	

=== Elections in the 1990s ===
General election 1997: Cheltenham
Party	Candidate	Votes	%	±%
Liberal Democrats	Nigel Jones	24,877	49.5	+1.8
Conservative	William Todman	18,232	36.2	–7.9
Labour	Barry Leach	5,100	10.1	+3.4
Referendum	Alison Powell	1,065	2.1	N/A
Monster Raving Loony	Kenneth Hanks	375	0.8	N/A
UKIP	Gordon Cook	302	0.6	N/A
ProLife Alliance	Anne Harriss	245	0.5	N/A
Natural Law	Sally Brighouse	107	0.2	N/A
Majority		6,645	13.3	+9.9
Turnout		50,303	74.0	–7.4
Registered electors		67,950		–1.7
Liberal Democrats hold		Swing	+4.9	

General election 1992: Cheltenham
Party	Candidate	Votes	%	±%
Liberal Democrats	Nigel Jones	30,351	47.3	+5.0
Conservative	John Taylor	28,683	44.7	–5.5
Labour	Pamela Tatlow	4,077	6.4	–1.1
Independent	Mervyn Rendell	665	1.0	N/A
Natural Law	Henry Brighouse	169	0.3	N/A
Independent	Mark Bruce-Smith	162	0.3	N/A
Majority		1,668	2.6	–5.3
Turnout		64,107	80.3	+1.4
Registered electors		79,808		+0.7
Liberal Democrats gain from Conservative		Swing	+5.2	

=== Elections in the 1980s ===
General election 1987: Cheltenham
Party	Candidate	Votes	%	±%
Conservative	Charles Irving	31,371	50.2	–0.4
Liberal	Richard Holme	26,475	42.3	+1.3
Labour	Michael Luker	4,701	7.5	–0.1
Majority		4,896	7.9	–1.7
Turnout		62,547	78.9	+3.0
Registered electors		79,234		+4.2
Conservative hold		Swing	–0.9	

General election 1983: Cheltenham
Party	Candidate	Votes	%	±%
Conservative	Charles Irving	29,187	50.6	–1.1
Liberal	Richard Holme	23,669	41.0	+11.4
Labour	Judith James	4,390	7.6	–10.5
Ecology	David Swindley	479	0.8	N/A
Majority		5,518	9.6	–12.5
Turnout		57,724	75.9	–2.5
Registered electors		76,068		+2.7
Conservative hold		Swing	–6.3	

=== Elections in the 1970s ===
General election 1979: Cheltenham
Party	Candidate	Votes	%	±%
Conservative	Charles Irving	25,618	51.0	+4.9
Liberal	Nigel Jones	15,080	30.0	+1.9
Labour	Michael Reilley	9,185	18.3	−7.5
National Front	Raymond Jacklin	342	0.7	N/A
Majority		10,538	21.0	+3.0
Turnout		50,225	77.6	+2.6
Registered electors		64,726		+3.2
Conservative hold		Swing	+1.5	

General election October 1974: Cheltenham
Party	Candidate	Votes	%	±%
Conservative	Charles Irving	21,691	46.1	+3.1
Liberal	Frederick Carson Rodger	13,237	28.1	−3.2
Labour	Fred Inglis	12,134	25.8	+0.1
Majority		8,454	18.0	+6.3
Turnout		47,062	75.0	−6.3
Registered electors		62,727		+1.0
Conservative hold		Swing	+3.1	

General election February 1974: Cheltenham
Party	Candidate	Votes	%	±%
Conservative	Douglas Dodds-Parker	21,723	43.0	−7.2
Liberal	Frederick Carson Rodger	15,811	31.3	+12.8
Labour	Hugh Gray	12,971	25.7	−5.6
Majority		5,912	11.7	−7.2
Turnout		50,505	81.3	+5.7
Registered electors		62,098		
Conservative hold		Swing	−10.0	

General election 1970: Cheltenham
Party	Candidate	Votes	%	±%
Conservative	Douglas Dodds-Parker	22,823	50.2	−3.2
Labour	Leslie George Godwin	14,213	31.3	−15.3
Liberal	A George Aldridge	8,431	18.5	N/A
Majority		8,610	18.9	+12.1
Turnout		45,467	75.6	−1.6
Registered electors		60,141		+9.4
Conservative hold		Swing	+6.0	

=== Elections in the 1960s ===
General election 1966: Cheltenham
Party	Candidate	Votes	%	±%
Conservative	Douglas Dodds-Parker	22,683	53.4	+6.2
Labour	W. John Wilson	19,768	46.6	+11.9
Majority		2,915	6.8	−5.7
Turnout		42,451	77.2	−0.3
Registered electors		54,964		+1.6
Conservative hold		Swing	−2.8	

General election 1964: Cheltenham
Party	Candidate	Votes	%	±%
Conservative	Douglas Dodds-Parker	19,797	47.2	−3.8
Labour	Hugh Gray	14,557	34.7	+5.2
Liberal	James Anthony Lemkin	7,568	18.1	−1.4
Majority		5,240	12.5	−9.0
Turnout		41,922	77.5	−4.0
Registered electors		54,120		+2.2
Conservative hold		Swing	−4.5	

=== Elections in the 1950s ===
General election 1959: Cheltenham
Party	Candidate	Votes	%	±%
Conservative	W. W. Hicks Beach	21,997	51.0	−8.3
Labour	Kamalakant G. Pendse	12,725	29.5	−11.2
Liberal	George Watson	8,428	19.5	N/A
Majority		9,272	21.5	+2.9
Turnout		43,150	81.5	+2.1
Registered electors		52,946		+2.8
Conservative hold		Swing	+1.4	

General election 1955: Cheltenham
Party	Candidate	Votes	%	±%
Conservative	W. W. Hicks Beach	24,259	59.3	+2.2
Labour	James Finnigan	16,638	40.7	−2.2
Majority		7,621	18.6	+4.4
Turnout		40,897	79.4	−3.8
Registered electors		51,491		+3.3
Conservative hold		Swing	+2.2	

General election 1951: Cheltenham
Party	Candidate	Votes	%	±%
Conservative	W. W. Hicks Beach	23,674	57.1	+13.7
Labour	James Finnigan	17,777	42.9	+11.5
Majority		5,897	14.2	+2.2
Turnout		41,451	83.2	−1.8
Registered electors		49,844		+2.2
Conservative hold		Swing	+1.1	

General election 1950: Cheltenham
Party	Candidate	Votes	%	±%
Conservative	W. W. Hicks Beach	18,009	43.4	
Labour	A. G. James	13,027	31.4	
Ind. Conservative	Daniel Lipson	10,449	25.2	
Majority		4,982	12.0	N/A
Turnout		41,485	85.0	
Registered electors		48,786		
Conservative gain from Ind. Conservative				

=== Election in the 1940s ===
General election 1945: Cheltenham
Party	Candidate	Votes	%	±%
National Independent	Daniel Lipson	16,081	43.3	N/A
Labour	Phyllis Maude Warner	11,095	29.9	+0.4
Conservative	W. W. Hicks Beach	9,972	26.8	−45.7
Majority		4,986	13.4	−27.6
Turnout		37,148	75.4	+5.0
Registered electors		49,282		+29.9
National Independent hold		Swing	+7.6	

General Election 1939–40:

Another General Election was required to take place before the end of 1940. The political parties had been making preparations for an election to take place from 1939 and by the end of this year, the following candidates had been selected;

- Independent Conservative: Daniel Lipson
- Conservative: C L Hargreaves
- Labour: John Baird

=== Elections in the 1930s ===
1937 Cheltenham by-election
Party	Candidate	Votes	%	±%
National Independent	Daniel Lipson	10,533	40.1	N/A
Conservative	R. T. Harper	10,194	38.8	−31.7
Labour	Cyril C Poole	5,570	21.2	−8.3
Majority		339	1.3	−39.7
Turnout		26,297	69.3	−1.1
Registered electors		37,947		+1.4
National gain from Conservative		Swing	N/A	

General election 1935: Cheltenham
Party	Candidate	Votes	%	±%
Conservative	Walter Preston	18,574	70.5	−10.6
Labour	Elizabeth Pakenham	7,784	29.5	+10.6
Majority		10,790	41.0	−21.2
Turnout		26,358	70.4	−4.8
Registered electors		37,428		+1.2
Conservative hold		Swing	−10.6	

General election 1931: Cheltenham
Party	Candidate	Votes	%	±%
Conservative	Walter Preston	22,524	81.1	+27.9
Labour	John Ramage	5,263	18.9	+1.8
Majority		17,261	62.2	+38.7
Turnout		27,787	75.2	−4.6
Registered electors		36,974		+2.7
Conservative hold		Swing	+13.0	

=== Elections in the 1920s ===
General election 1929: Cheltenham
Party	Candidate	Votes	%	±%
Unionist	Walter Preston	15,279	53.2	–3.4
Liberal	Frank Raffety	8,533	29.7	–13.7
Labour	William Ramsey Piggott	4,920	17.1	N/A
Majority		6,746	23.5	+10.3
Turnout		28,732	79.8	–2.9
Registered electors		35,993		+37.0
Unionist hold		Swing	+2.8	

1928 Cheltenham by-election
Party	Candidate	Votes	%	±%
Unionist	Walter Preston	10,438	49.5	−7.1
Liberal	John Brunner	6,678	31.7	−11.7
Labour	Florence Widdowson	3,962	18.8	N/A
Majority		3,760	17.8	+4.6
Turnout		21,078	80.3	−2.4
Registered electors		26,265		+3.2
Unionist hold		Swing	+2.3	

General election 1924: Cheltenham
Party	Candidate	Votes	%	±%
Unionist	James Agg-Gardner	11,909	56.6	+3.2
Liberal	Stanley Holmes	9,146	43.4	−3.2
Majority		2,763	13.2	+6.4
Turnout		21,055	82.7	+3.2
Registered electors		25,454		+2.8
Unionist hold		Swing	+3.2	

General election 1923: Cheltenham
Party	Candidate	Votes	%	±%
Unionist	James Agg-Gardner	10,514	53.4	−4.6
Liberal	Cuthbert Plaistowe	9,170	46.6	+4.6
Majority		1,344	6.8	−9.2
Turnout		19,684	79.5	−2.3
Registered electors		24,768		+3.2
Unionist hold		Swing	−4.6	

General election 1922: Cheltenham
Party	Candidate	Votes	%	±%
Unionist	James Agg-Gardner	11,383	58.0	−2.3
Liberal	Cuthbert Plaistowe	8,237	42.0	N/A
Majority		3,146	16.0	−4.6
Turnout		19,620	81.8	+13.2
Registered electors		23,997		+3.4
Unionist hold		Swing	−2.3	

=== Elections in the 1910s ===
General election 1918: Cheltenham
Party	Candidate	Votes	%	±%
Unionist	James Agg-Gardner	9,602	60.3	
Independent Liberal	Richard Davies	6,317	39.7	N/A
Majority		3,285	20.6	
Turnout		15,919	68.6	
Registered electors		23,217		
Unionist hold				
C indicates candidate endorsed by the coalition government.

General Election 1914–15:

A general election was due to take place by the end of 1915. By the autumn of 1914, the following candidates had been adopted to contest that election.

- Unionist Party: James Agg-Gardner
- Liberal Party: Rhys Williams

Due to the outbreak of war, the election never took place.

1911 Cheltenham by-election
Party	Candidate	Votes	%	±%
Conservative	James Agg-Gardner	4,043	50.0	+0.6
Liberal	Lewis Mathias	4,039	50.0	−0.6
Majority		4	0.0	N/A
Turnout		8,082	92.8	+1.8
Registered electors		8,712		+4.3
Conservative gain from Liberal		Swing	+0.6	

Mathias

General election December 1910: Cheltenham
Party	Candidate	Votes	%	±%
Liberal	Richard Mathias	3,846	50.6	+1.5
Conservative	Vere Ponsonby	3,753	49.4	−1.5
Majority		93	1.2	N/A
Turnout		7,599	91.0	−2.8
Registered electors		8,353		0.0
Liberal gain from Conservative		Swing	+1.5	

General election January 1910: Cheltenham
Party	Candidate	Votes	%	±%
Conservative	Vere Ponsonby	3,988	50.9	+3.6
Liberal	Richard Mathias	3,850	49.1	−3.6
Majority		138	1.8	N/A
Turnout		7,838	93.8	+2.4
Registered electors		8,353		+2.9
Conservative gain from Liberal		Swing	+3.6	

=== Elections in the 1900s ===
Sears

General election 1906: Cheltenham
Party	Candidate	Votes	%	±%
Liberal	John Sears	3,910	52.7	N/A
Conservative	James Agg-Gardner	3,509	47.3	N/A
Majority		401	5.4	N/A
Turnout		7,419	91.4	N/A
Registered electors		8,114		N/A
Liberal gain from Conservative				

General election 1900: Cheltenham
Party	Candidate	Votes	%	±%
Conservative	James Agg-Gardner	Unopposed		
Conservative hold				

=== Elections in the 1890s ===
General election 1895: Cheltenham
Party	Candidate	Votes	%	±%
Conservative	Francis Russell	3,409	53.5	−1.9
Liberal	Wilfrid T Blaydes	2,940	46.1	+1.5
Independent Labour	Alton William Hillen	23	0.4	N/A
Majority		469	7.4	−3.4
Turnout		6,372	88.9	+0.8
Registered electors		7,169		+7.9
Conservative hold		Swing	−1.7	

General election 1892: Cheltenham
Party	Candidate	Votes	%	±%
Conservative	James Agg-Gardner	3,241	55.4	−4.1
Liberal	Frank Debenham	2,610	44.6	+4.1
Majority		631	10.8	−8.2
Turnout		5,851	88.1	+1.7
Registered electors		6,642		+2.8
Conservative hold		Swing	−4.1	

=== Elections in the 1880s ===
General election 1886: Cheltenham
Party	Candidate	Votes	%	±%
Conservative	James Agg-Gardner	3,323	59.5	+3.0
Liberal	Russell Hugh Worthington Biggs	2,260	40.5	−3.0
Majority		1,063	19.0	+6.0
Turnout		5,583	86.4	−9.6
Registered electors		6,464		+3.0
Conservative hold		Swing	+3.0	

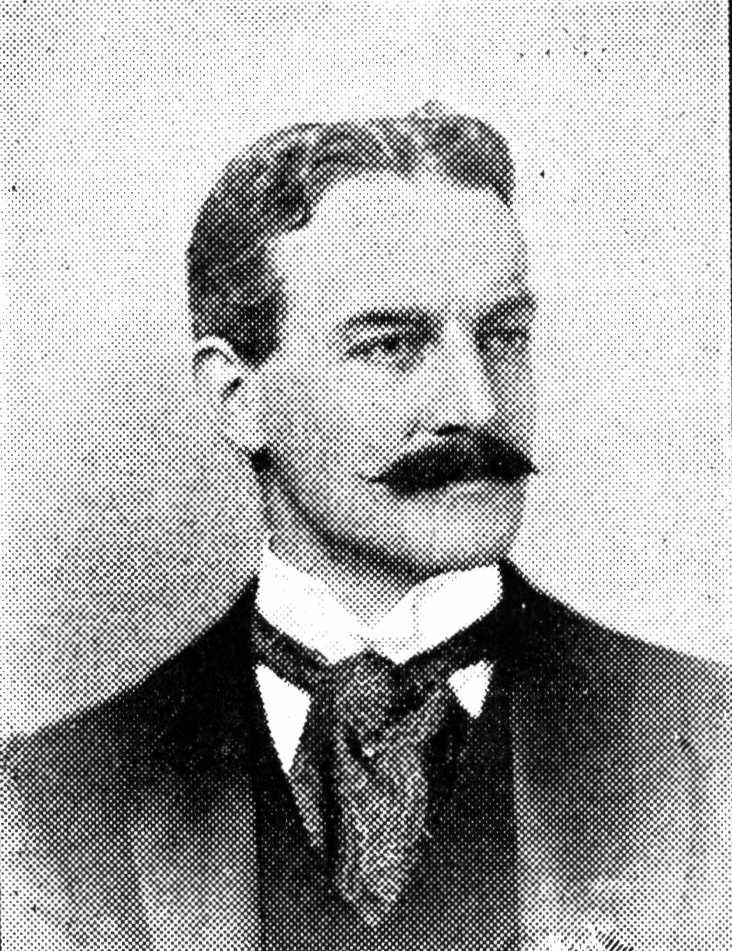
Lehmann

General election 1885: Cheltenham
Party	Candidate	Votes	%	±%
Conservative	James Agg-Gardner	3,504	56.5	+6.7
Liberal	R. C. Lehmann	2,700	43.5	−6.7
Majority		804	13.0	N/A
Turnout		6,204	96.0	+4.1
Registered electors		6,464		+28.8
Conservative gain from Liberal		Swing	+6.7	

General election 1880: Cheltenham
Party	Candidate	Votes	%	±%
Liberal	Charles de Ferrieres	2,318	50.2	+3.7
Conservative	James Agg-Gardner	2,297	49.8	−3.7
Majority		21	0.4	N/A
Turnout		4,615	91.9	+2.6
Registered electors		5,018		+13.1
Liberal gain from Conservative		Swing	+3.7	

=== Election in the 1870s ===
General election 1874: Cheltenham
Party	Candidate	Votes	%	±%
Conservative	James Agg-Gardner	2,121	53.5	+6.5
Liberal	Henry Samuelson	1,842	46.5	−6.5
Majority		279	7.0	N/A
Turnout		3,963	89.3	+1.5
Registered electors		4,438		+25.5
Conservative gain from Liberal		Swing	+6.5	

=== Elections in the 1860s ===
General election 1868: Cheltenham
Party	Candidate	Votes	%	±%
Liberal	Henry Samuelson	1,646	53.0	+3.6
Conservative	James Agg-Gardner	1,458	47.0	−3.6
Majority		188	6.0	N/A
Turnout		3,104	87.8	+6.0
Registered electors		3,536		+26.6
Liberal gain from Conservative		Swing	+3.6	

General election 1865: Cheltenham
Party	Candidate	Votes	%	±%
Conservative	Charles Schreiber	1,157	50.6	+0.9
Liberal	Francis Berkeley	1,129	49.4	−0.9
Majority		28	1.2	N/A
Turnout		2,286	81.8	−2.6
Registered electors		2,793		+28.7
Conservative gain from Liberal		Swing	+0.9	

=== Elections in the 1850s ===
General election 1859: Cheltenham
Party	Candidate	Votes	%	±%
Liberal	Francis Berkeley	922	50.3	N/A
Conservative	Charles Schreiber	910	49.7	N/A
Majority		12	0.6	N/A
Turnout		1,832	84.4	N/A
Registered electors		2,171		
Liberal hold				

General election 1857: Cheltenham
Party	Candidate	Votes	%	±%
Whig	Francis Berkeley	Unopposed		
Registered electors		2,170		
Whig hold				

By-election, 8 May 1856: Cheltenham
Party	Candidate	Votes	%	±%
Whig	Francis Berkeley	841	56.2	+2.7
Conservative	Edmund Gilling Hallewell	655	43.8	−2.7
Majority		186	12.4	+5.4
Turnout		1,496	68.9	−8.9
Registered electors		2,170		
Whig hold		Swing	+2.7	

- Caused by Berkeley's appointment as a Commissioner of Customs.

By-election, 14 July 1855: Cheltenham
Party	Candidate	Votes	%	±%
Whig	Grenville Berkeley	760	81.0	+27.5
Conservative	William Ridler	178	19.0	−27.5
Majority		582	62.0	+55.0
Turnout		938	43.7	−34.1
Registered electors		2,147		
Whig hold		Swing	+27.5	

- Caused by Berkeley's death.

General election 1852: Cheltenham
Party	Candidate	Votes	%	±%
Whig	Craven Berkeley	999	53.5	+6.4
Conservative	Willoughby Jones	869	46.5	−6.4
Majority		130	7.0	N/A
Turnout		1,868	77.8	−4.3
Registered electors		2,400		
Whig gain from Conservative		Swing	+6.3	

=== Elections in the 1840s ===
By-election, 4 September 1848: Cheltenham
Party	Candidate	Votes	%	±%
Whig	Grenville Berkeley	986	54.1	+7.0
Conservative	Bickham Escott	835	45.9	−7.0
Majority		151	8.2	N/A
Turnout		1,821	77.7	−4.4
Registered electors		2,345		
Whig gain from Conservative		Swing	+6.9	

- Election declared void on petition due to "acts of corruption"

By-election, 29 June 1848: Cheltenham
Party	Candidate	Votes	%	±%
Whig	Craven Berkeley	1,024	54.7	+7.6
Conservative	James Agg-Gardner	848	45.3	−7.4
Majority		176	9.4	N/A
Turnout		1,872	79.8	−2.3
Registered electors		2,345		
Whig gain from Conservative		Swing	+7.5	

- Election declared void on petition due to bribery

General election 1847: Cheltenham
Party	Candidate	Votes	%	±%
Conservative	Willoughby Jones	1,015	52.7	+6.7
Whig	Craven Berkeley	907	47.1	−6.6
Conservative	Edmund Carrington Smith	4	0.2	N/A
Majority		108	5.6	N/A
Turnout		1,926	82.1	+11.1
Registered electors		2,345		
Conservative gain from Whig		Swing	+6.7	

General election 1841: Cheltenham
Party	Candidate	Votes	%	±%
Whig	Craven Berkeley	764	53.7	−14.3
Conservative	James Agg-Gardner	655	46.0	+14.0
Radical	Thomas Perronet Thompson	4	0.3	N/A
Majority		109	7.7	−28.3
Turnout		1,423	71.0	+0.8
Registered electors		2,003		
Whig hold		Swing	−14.2	

=== Elections in the 1830s ===
General election 1837: Cheltenham
Party	Candidate	Votes	%	±%
Whig	Craven Berkeley	632	68.0	−26.3
Conservative	Jonathan Peel	298	32.0	N/A
Majority		334	36.0	−52.6
Turnout		930	70.2	+24.8
Registered electors		1,324		
Whig hold				

General election 1835: Cheltenham
Party	Candidate	Votes	%	±%
Whig	Craven Berkeley	411	94.3	N/A
Radical	William Penn Gaskell	25	5.7	N/A
Majority		386	88.6	N/A
Turnout		436	45.4	N/A
Registered electors		960		
Whig hold		Swing	N/A	

General election 1832: Cheltenham
Party	Candidate	Votes	%	±%
Whig	Craven Berkeley	Unopposed		
Registered electors		919		
Whig win (new seat)				

== See also ==
- List of parliamentary constituencies in Gloucestershire

== Notes ==
Elections
