= 1928 Cheltenham by-election =

1928 UK parliamentary by-election

The 1928 Cheltenham by-election was a parliamentary by-election held on 26 September 1928 for the British House of Commons constituency of Cheltenham in Gloucestershire.

The seat had become vacant when the constituency's Conservative Member of Parliament (MP), Sir James Agg-Gardner, had died on 9 August 1928, aged 81. He had held the seat since a by-election in 1911, having previously been Cheltenham's MP from 1874 to 1880, 1885 to 1895, and 1900 to 1906.

== Candidates ==
The Liberal Party selected 63-year old Sir John Brunner, a political veteran who had been MP for three previous constituencies, most recently Southport from 1923 to 1924.

The Conservative Party candidate was 53-year old Sir Walter Preston, who had been MP for Mile End from 1918 to 1923. The Labour Party candidate was Florence Widdowson, aged 37.

== Result ==
Preston held the seat for the Conservatives with a comfortable majority of 3,760 votes over Brunner. He held the seat until his resignation from the House of Commons in 1937, triggering another by-election in Chelternham.

Widdowson unsuccessfully contested the Rushcliffe constituency in Nottingham in 1929 and again in 1931, the later time under her married name of Florence Paton. She did stand in 1935, but finally won the Rushcliffe seat at the 1945 general election.

Brunner did not stand for Parliament again.

Cheltenham by-election, 26 September 1928
Party	Candidate	Votes	%	±%
Conservative	Walter Preston	10,438	49.5	−7.1
Liberal	John Brunner	6,678	31.7	−11.7
Labour	Florence Widdowson	3,962	18.8	New
Majority		3,760	17.8	+4.6
Turnout		21,078	80.3	−2.4
Conservative hold		Swing		

== See also ==
- Cheltenham constituency
- 1911 Cheltenham by-election
- 1937 Cheltenham by-election
- Cheltenham
- List of United Kingdom by-elections (1918–1931)
- United Kingdom by-election records
