= Derief Taylor =

Jamaican cricketer

Personal information
- Full name: Derief David Samuel Taylor
- Born: 17 September 1910; Kingston, Jamaica
- Died: 17 March 1987 (aged 76); Cross Roads, Jamaica
- Batting: Left-handed
- Bowling: Slow left-arm orthodox
- Relatives: Baron Taylor of Warwick (son)

Domestic team information
- Years: Team
- 1948–1950: Warwickshire

Career statistics
Competition	First-class
Matches	16
Runs scored	519
Batting average	32.43
100s/50s	1/2
Top score	121
Balls bowled	1962
Wickets	15
Bowling average	40.46
5 wickets in innings	0
10 wickets in match	0
Best bowling	3/41
Catches/stumpings	4/0
- Source: Cricket Archive, 31 December 2014

Derief David Samuel Taylor (17 September 1910 – 17 March 1987) was a Jamaican cricketer who played for Warwickshire from 1948 to 1950, and then coached the county from 1951 to 1981.

== Playing career ==
Derief Taylor left a taxi business in Kingston to fight in World War II. While serving with the British Eighth Army in the North African campaign he met the Warwickshire batsman Tom Dollery, and decided to try his luck as a professional cricketer with Warwickshire. In order to maximise his chances of playing he did not tell the club his real age. His birth date appeared in Wisden simply as "b. 1918".

In 1948 he played a few matches as a left-arm spinner and tail-end batsman with little success, but in 1949, promoted to the middle order, he scored 438 runs at an average of 43.80 and took 12 wickets at 33.50. He had an unusual batting stance, facing mid-on, instead of the usual off-side. Against Leicestershire he made 121, adding 178 for the fifth wicket with Dollery, both men playing "fine strokes all round the wicket". He also made 54 not out and 42 not out and took match figures of 57–31–58–4 against Combined Services. After the 1949 season Wisden suggested that "this West Indian left-hander should prove a great asset". However, he played only two matches in 1950 before poor form and injury ended his first-class career.

== Coaching career ==
Taylor did "prove a great asset" though. While trying to recover from a shoulder injury in 1951 he began informally coaching some of the county's young players. He showed such aptitude for coaching the young that Warwickshire employed him as a coach until he retired in 1981. The cricket journalist Rowland Ryder regarded him as "probably the best coach of the under-18 age group in the country"; Taylor had "an infinite capacity to understand the adolescent mind". He was "a tremendous believer in natural ability and [showed] unlimited patience" with young players.

The Jamaican Cricket Board of Control brought him to Jamaica in December 1963 for two months to teach coaches and help co-ordinate coaching in Jamaica. He managed the England women's cricket team that toured Jamaica in 1970 and won the three-match series against the Jamaican women's team 1-0.

To mark his 25 years as coach, Warwickshire awarded him a testimonial in 1976. After he retired, he returned to Jamaica in 1982, but his health declined and he died in 1987.

His marriage to his wife Enid did not last, but their son John became a barrister and politician and in 1996 entered the House of Lords as Baron Taylor of Warwick.
