= Douglas Dodds-Parker =

British politician (1909–2006)

Sir Douglas Dodds-Parker

Member of Parliament for Cheltenham
- In office 15 October 1964 – 20 September 1974
- Preceded by: W. W. Hicks Beach
- Succeeded by: Charles Irving

Member of Parliament for Banbury
- In office 5 July 1945 – 18 September 1959
- Preceded by: Sir James Edmondson
- Succeeded by: Neil Marten

Personal details
- Born: Arthur Douglas Dodds-Parker; 5 July 1909 Oxford, England
- Died: 13 September 2006 (aged 97) London, England
- Party: Conservative
- Spouse: Aileen Coster (m. 1946)
- Children: 1
- Education: Winchester College
- Alma mater: Magdalen College, Oxford

Sir Arthur Douglas Dodds-Parker (5 July 1909 – 13 September 2006) was a British imperial administrator, a wartime soldier involved in irregular warfare, and Conservative politician.

Between the wars, he served in the Sudan, in the prestigious Sudan Political Service. Once the war broke out, he joined the Special Operations Executive (SOE), but was returned to the Sudan to serve in the famous Gideon Force during the liberation of Ethiopia. After the East African campaign, he served on SOE's planning staff in London, before taking command roles in the Mediterranean Theatre.

In political life, he served twice as a Member of Parliament (MP). He was MP for Banbury from 1945 to 1959, holding three junior ministerial positions from 1953 to 1957. In particular, he was Parliamentary Under-Secretary of State for Foreign Affairs through the Suez Crisis in 1956. Unlike Sir Anthony Nutting, who resigned as Minister of State at the Foreign Office, Dodds-Parker considered it his duty to remain in office even though he did not support the plan for Britain and France to invade Egypt under the pretext of separating the Egyptians from a prearranged invasion by Israel; he was, however, sacked from government in the following year. He stood down from his seat in the House of Commons in 1959, but returned to Parliament as MP for Cheltenham from 1964 to 1974.

== Early life ==
Dodds-Parker was born in Oxford, the eldest son of a surgeon. His maternal uncle, Fredric Wise, was MP for Ilford; another relation, John Parker, was Joint Secretary to the Treasury from 1846 to 1849; and the Parkers had been iron founders since the 15th century. He was educated at Winchester College and then read modern history at Magdalen College, Oxford.

He joined the elite Sudan Political Service (SPS) in 1930. The size of territory allotted to each young graduate, just starting their career, was immense and the SPS needed to, and was able to, choose only the pick of each year's crop. He spent three years in Kordofan, the two years in the secretariat in Khartoum, as private secretary to the Governor-General, Sir Stewart Symes.

In 1935, the Italian invasion of Ethiopia prompted some soul-searching about the defence of the British territories in the vicinity. The Sudan was the missing 'bridge' between Italian East Africa and Italian North Africa, so the issue was taken very seriously in Khartoum. Accordingly, some young SPS were allowed to join the reserve of the Sudan Defence Force (SDF). This was to prove useful when the war did break out later, as most administrators had to remain in post for some time, until older men could be recalled to replace them.

The Sudan was not a British colony, as it was officially a condominium with the formal title being the Anglo-Egyptian Sudan. Though Egyptian control was rather nominal it did mean the territory fell to the Foreign Office, not the Colonial Office, and, by definition, the Colonial Administrative Service could not operate there either. The result was the SPS, which stood at the top of the imperial tree alongside the Indian Political Service. The SPS was very selective in recruitment but favoured champion sportsmen rather than scholars, leading to the popular adage of the time was that Sudan was a country of 'blacks ruled by Blues', after the colours awarded to sports teams captains at Oxbridge.

== War service ==
After the war broke out in 1939, Dodds-Parker left Sudan to join the Grenadier Guards, but was seconded to the Special Operations Executive when it was formed in July 1940. He served in the field as an officer in Gideon Force, under Orde Wingate, organising "ungentlemanly warfare" against Italy in Ethiopia and helping Emperor Haile Selassie to return to Addis Ababa in May 1941. As well as Wingate, he served with (Sir) Wilfred Thesiger and (Sir) Laurens van der Post.

He returned to London soon afterwards, to become a mission planner under Colin Gubbins, using his newly gained practical experience to organise guerrilla warfare and 'Set Europe Ablaze', by infiltrating Special Operations teams into occupied Europe.

Dodds-Parker was finally sent in late 1942 to Algiers, where he assisted with the negotiations for the armistice with Italy, and then in Apulia to command SOE operations in the Western and Central Mediterranean, in charge of operations in Italy and along the Adriatic, but also to Poland and Eastern Europe. He then had a spell in Athens. He ended the war at Supreme Headquarters Allied Expeditionary Force in Paris, with the rank of colonel. He was awarded the Légion d'honneur and Croix de Guerre for his efforts, and Mentioned in Dispatches.

He married Aileen Coster in 1946, the American widow of his second cousin. They had one son, Peter.

== Political career ==
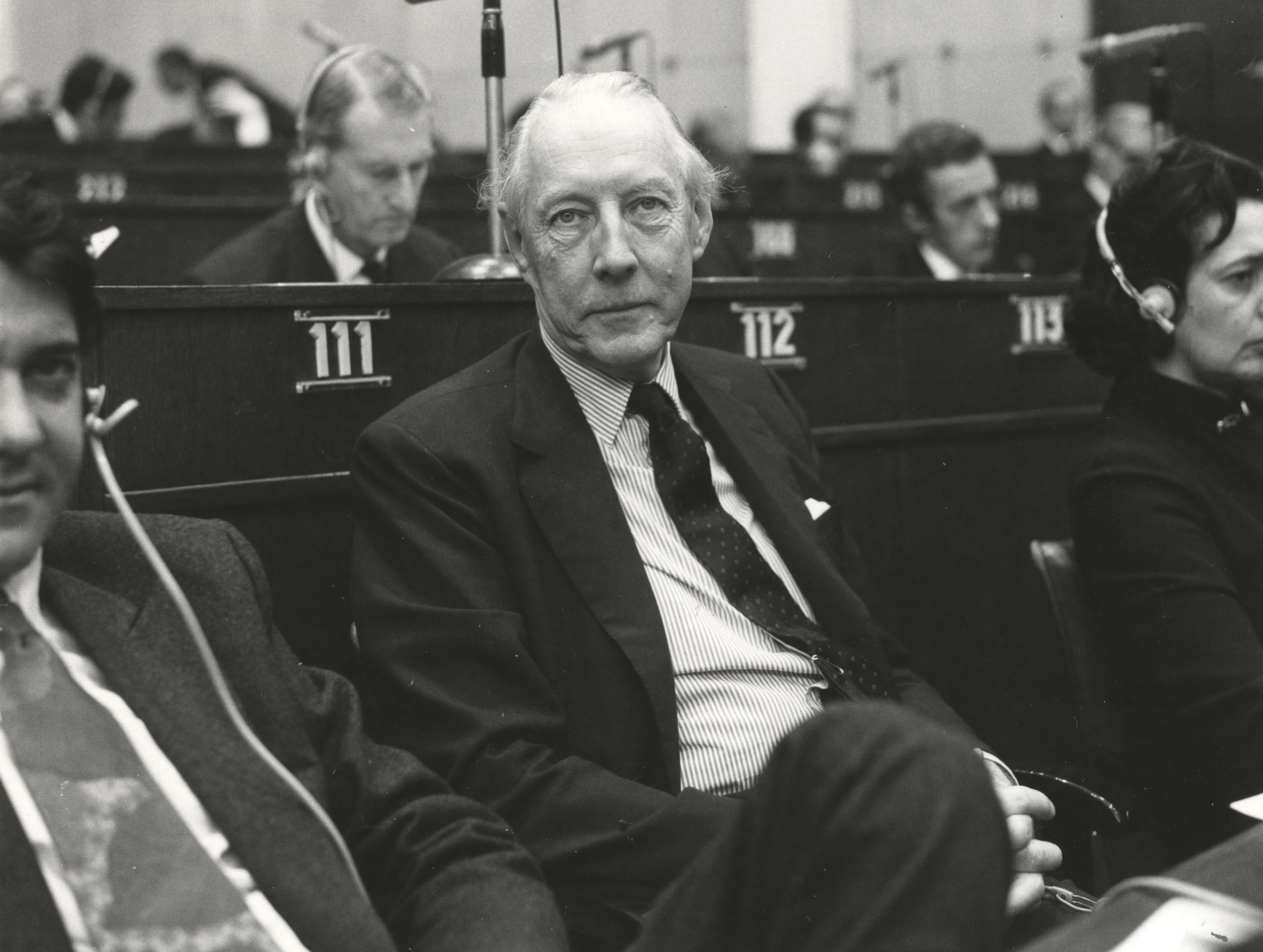
Dodds-Parker in 1973

Dodds-Parker left the army to pursue a political career as soon as the war in Europe was over, and was elected MP for Banbury in the 1945 general election. He continued as MP for Banbury until he stood down at the 1959 general election.

He declined an invitation to become Winston Churchill's Parliamentary Private Secretary, or to become a Conservative whip, preferring to serve on Parliamentary committees, but served on the executive of the 1922 Committee from 1951 to 1953. He was a junior Foreign Office minister from November 1953 to 1954, as a Parliamentary Under-Secretary of State for Foreign Affairs, then a Parliamentary Under-Secretary of State in the Commonwealth Relations Office from 1954 to 1955, before resuming his junior ministerial position at the Foreign Office in December 1955. He was one of the hosts of Nikolai Bulganin and Nikita Khrushchev when they visited the UK in April 1956, and was in office during the Suez Crisis in October 1956. He opposed the plan for Britain and France to invade Egypt, under the pretext of separating the Egyptians from a prearranged invasion by Israel, but felt it his duty to remain in office, unlike Sir Anthony Nutting, who resigned as Minister of State at the Foreign Office. The Foreign Secretary Selwyn Lloyd was often absent from the House of Commons, and Dodds-Parker was forced to answer questions, unconvincingly, in his stead. After Anthony Eden was replaced as Prime Minister by Harold Macmillan, Dodds-Parker was sacked in January 1957. He did not contest his seat in the 1959 general election.

After a period in business, as a director of Head Wrightson and of British Empire Steel Products, Dodds-Parker returned to Parliament as MP for Cheltenham in the 1964 general election. Edward Heath took up the leadership of the Conservative Party after its 1964 election defeat, and Dodds-Parker returned to a degree of favour with the party leadership. He was a vice-chairman of the Conservative Party from 1964 to 1970. He was a delegate to the Council of Europe in 1965, and also to the North Atlantic Assembly and the Western European Union Assembly. He led a delegation of MPs to China in 1972, the first visit organised since the Communist Revolution.

According to the 1970 BBC Election broadcast, he was the tallest MP in the House of Commons at the time.

He was knighted in 1973, after Edward Heath sent him to Strasbourg as part of the first British delegation in the European Parliament. He left the House of Commons at the October 1974 general election, but remained a Member of the European Parliament until 1975.

== Later life ==
Dodds-Parker published two memoirs in his retirement. Setting Europe Ablaze, an account of his exploits with SOE in the Second World War, was published in 1983, taking its title from a Churchill quotation on the role of SOE. It was followed by Political Eunuch, an account of his political career, in 1986. He gave his political and personal papers to Magdalen College, Oxford in 1997.

He died in London aged 97, and is survived by his wife, a son, and a stepson.

Parliament of the United Kingdom
Preceded by Sir James Edmondson	Member of Parliament for Banbury; 1945–1959	Succeeded by Neil Marten
Preceded by Hicks Beach	Member of Parliament for Cheltenham; 1964–October 1974	Succeeded by Charles Irving
