= W. W. Hicks Beach =

British Conservative politician (1907–1975)

Major William Whitehead Hicks Beach (23 March 1907 – 1 January 1975) was a Conservative politician in the United Kingdom. He was member of parliament for Cheltenham from 1950 to 1964 and was also an Alderman of Cheltenham Borough Council.

== Life ==
The son of Ellis Hicks Beach (1874–1943) by his marriage to Nancy Whitehead, he was the grandson of William Frederick Hicks-Beach (1841–1923), a younger brother of Michael Hicks Beach, 1st Earl St Aldwyn.

Hicks Beach was educated at Eton College and Magdalene College, Cambridge. He trained as a solicitor, becoming a partner in the firm of Payne, Hicks Beach and Co., and was also a director of several insurance companies. He was a Major in the Royal Gloucestershire Hussars and was promoted to captain in the Territorial Army Royal Armoured Corps.

Through his grandfather, he inherited the manor of Cranham, Gloucestershire.

On 12 September 1939, Hicks Beach married Diana Hoare (1911–2002), a daughter of Christopher "Kit" Gurney Hoare, the chairman of stockbrokers Hoare & Co. They had two daughters, Elizabeth (later Mrs Hinson) and Rosemary (later Mrs Naylor), and a son, Mark Hicks Beach (1943–1998).

He is buried in the churchyard of St Mary's, Great Witcombe, Gloucestershire.

A road on the Hesters Way housing estate in Cheltenham is named after him.

== Notes ==
Parliament of the United Kingdom
| Preceded by Daniel Lipson | Member of Parliament for Cheltenham; 1950–1964 | Succeeded by Sir Douglas Dodds-Parker |
