= Martin Horwood =

British Liberal Democrat politician

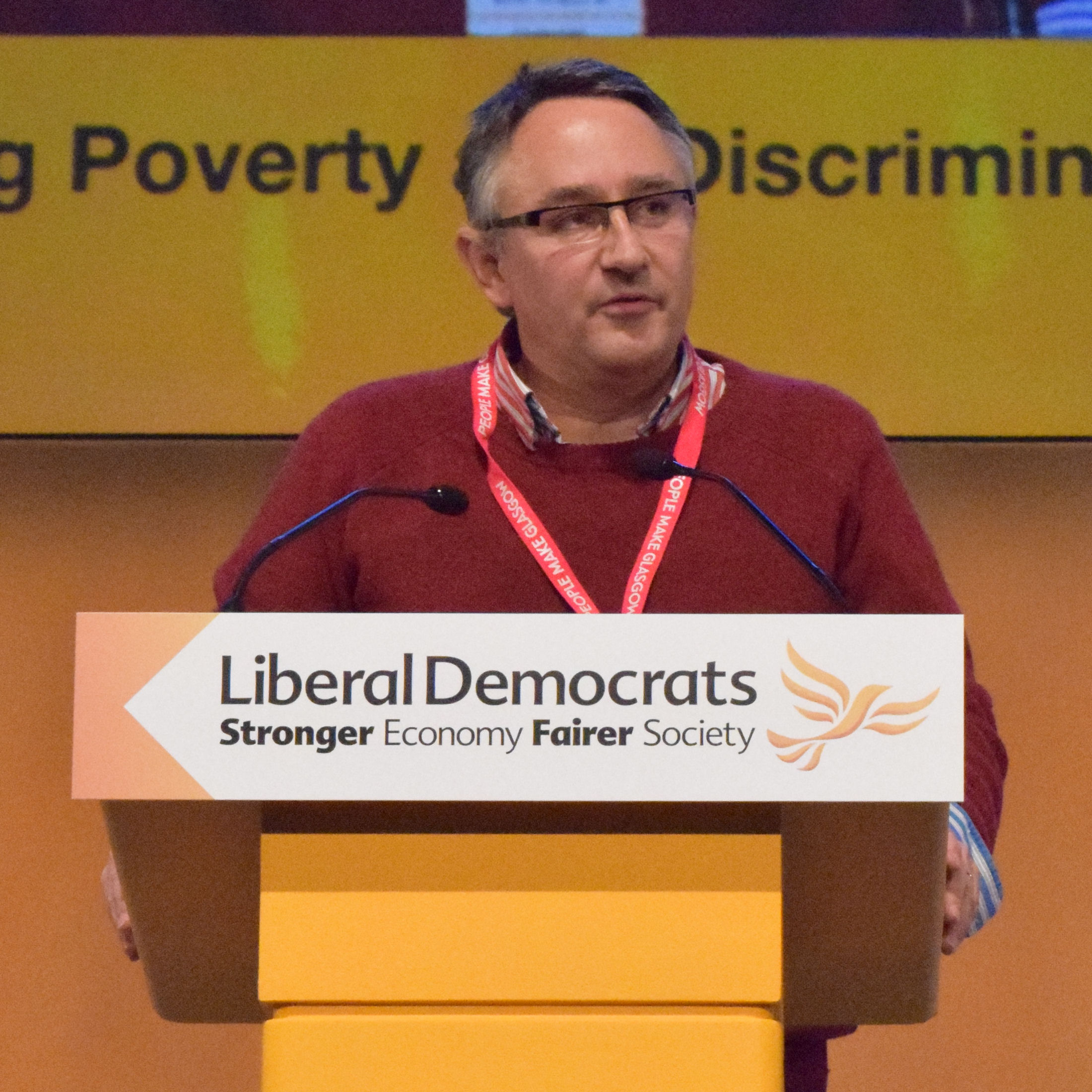
- Martin Horwood in 2014

Member of the European Parliament for South West England
- In office 2 July 2019 – 31 January 2020
- Preceded by: Clare Moody
- Succeeded by: Constituency abolished

Member of Parliament for Cheltenham
- In office 5 May 2005 – 30 March 2015
- Preceded by: Nigel Jones
- Succeeded by: Alex Chalk

Personal details
- Born: Martin Charles Horwood; 12 October 1962 (age 63) Cheltenham, Gloucestershire, England
- Party: Liberal Democrats
- Spouse: Shona Arora (m. 1995)
- Children: 2
- Education: The Queen's College, Oxford

Martin Charles Horwood (born 12 October 1962) is a British Liberal Democrat politician who represented South West England in the European Parliament from 2019 to 2020. He previously served as the Member of Parliament for Cheltenham from 2005 to 2015.

During his tenure, he founded the All-Party Parliamentary Group for Tribal Peoples. Horwood is now director of engagement and impact at Development Initiatives.

== Early life and education ==
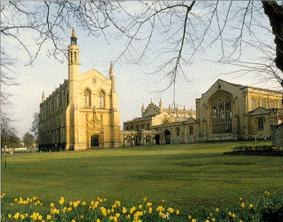
Cheltenham College

Horwood was born in St. Paul's, Cheltenham. His parents lived first in St. Mark's and then in Leckhampton, where his mother still lives.

He attended two independent schools in Cheltenham, Pate's Junior School and Cheltenham College. At the latter, he was a contemporary of fellow MP Chris Bryant and sat next to him in English classes. He joined the Cheltenham Young Liberals in 1979 while still at school.

In 1981, he went on to read Modern History at The Queen's College, Oxford, and was elected president of the Oxford Student Liberal Society and then chair of the party's national student wing, the Union of Liberal Students.

== Parliamentary career ==
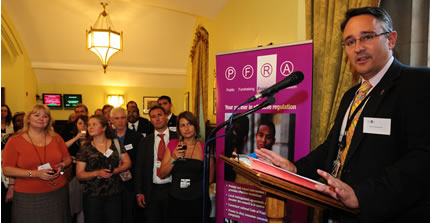
Horwood speaking at a reception in the Houses of Parliament, June 2009

Horwood stood twice unsuccessfully before gaining election. In 1992, he was defeated by Labour's Andrew Smith in the seat of Oxford East, he came third with 13% share of the vote. In 2001, he came third in Cities of London and Westminster, with 15.4% share of the vote.

Horwood was adopted as parliamentary candidate for Cheltenham following the decision by sitting Liberal Democrat MP Nigel Jones to stand down. Horwood was elected at the 2005 general election, winning the seat with a majority of 2,303 over the Conservatives, although the Liberal Democrats' share of the vote fell by 6.2%.

He was appointed by his party to the select committee scrutinising the work of the Office of the Deputy Prime Minister – now the Department for Communities and Local Government.

In July 2005, then party leader Charles Kennedy appointed Horwood to the Shadow Home Affairs team, before he was promoted by Menzies Campbell to be Shadow Environment Minister, under Chris Huhne, whom Horwood had backed in the party's leadership election.

Horwood was the chairman and founder of the All-Party Parliamentary Group for Tribal Peoples. Created in 2007, the APPG for Tribal Peoples is composed of over 30 cross-party MPs and peers with the aim of raising parliamentary and public awareness of tribal peoples. Its secretariat is the international indigenous rights organisation, Survival International. The Group meets two or three times a year and one of its main objectives is to press for ratification of ILO Convention 169 on the rights of indigenous and tribal peoples.

Horwood was also the Secretary of the APPG on corporate responsibility.

In March 2009, Horwood was one of several MPs used as examples by the BBC looking at the reliability of Wikipedia. He urged Wikipedia to crack down upon abuses of the open editing facility and "acts of political vandalism".

In December 2010, Horwood attended the United Nations Climate Change Conference in Cancún, Mexico with fellow Liberal Democrat, then Secretary of State for Energy and Climate Change, Chris Huhne.

Despite having secured over 50% of the vote in the 2010 general election, with a 9.3% swing and a 3,920-vote majority, Horwood lost his seat during the national Liberal Democrat collapse in the 2015 general election, losing to the Conservative candidate Alex Chalk. He unsuccessfully attempted to regain his seat during the 2017 general election, although he reduced Chalk's majority by 7.6%.

== Life after Parliament ==
Since 2015, Horwood has been director of engagement and impact at Development Initiatives. In 2018 he also won an election to Cheltenham Borough Council, becoming councillor for the Leckhampton ward.

In the 2019 European Parliament election, Horwood was selected by the Liberal Democrats to contest the six-member constituency of South West England; he was second on the party's list. The party polled 23.2% in the constituency and Horwood was elected.

As of February 2021, Horwood was a member of Cheltenham Borough Council. He is Cabinet Member for Corporate affairs.

Parliament of the United Kingdom
Preceded by Nigel Jones	Member of Parliament for Cheltenham; 2005–2015	Succeeded by Alex Chalk
