= 1911 Cheltenham by-election =

1911 UK parliamentary by-election

The 1911 Cheltenham by-election was a Parliamentary by-election held on 28 April 1911. It returned one Member of Parliament (MP) to the House of Commons of the Parliament of the United Kingdom, elected by the first past the post voting system.

== Previous result ==
Richard Mathias

General election December 1910
| Party | Candidate | Votes | % | ±% |
|---|---|---|---|---|
| Liberal | Richard Mathias | 3,846 | 50.6 | −1.5 |
| Liberal Unionist | Vere Ponsonby | 3,753 | 49.4 | +1.5 |
| Majority | | 93 | 1.2 | N/A |
| Turnout | | 7,599 | 91.0 | −2.8 |
| Liberal gain from Liberal Unionist | | Swing | +1.5 | |

== Result ==
The Conservative Party gained the seat from the Liberal Party.

Cheltenham by-election, 1911: Electorate
| Party | Candidate | Votes | % | ±% |
|---|---|---|---|---|
| Conservative | James Agg-Gardner | 4,043 | 50.0 | +0.6 |
| Liberal | Lewis Mathias | 4,039 | 50.0 | −0.6 |
| Majority | | 4 | 0.0 | N/A |
| Turnout | | 8,082 | 92.8 | +1.8 |
| Conservative gain from Liberal | | Swing | +0.6 | |

== Aftermath ==
A general election was due to take place by the end of 1915. By the autumn of 1914, the following candidates had been adopted to contest that election. Due to the outbreak of war, the election never took place.

General Election 1914/15: Electorate 8,755
| Party | Candidate | Votes | % | ±% |
|---|---|---|---|---|
| Unionist | James Agg-Gardner | | | |
| Liberal | | | | |

General election 14 December 1918: Electorate 23,217
| Party | Candidate | Votes | % | ±% |
|---|---|---|---|---|
| Unionist | James Agg-Gardner | 9,602 | 60.3 | +10.3 |
| Liberal | Richard Davies | 6,317 | 39.7 | −10.3 |
| Majority | | 3,285 | 20.6 | +20.6 |
| Turnout | | 15,919 | 68.6 | −24.2 |
| Unionist hold | | Swing | | |

- Agg-Gardner was officially supported by the Coalition Government.
