= Nigel Jones, Baron Jones of Cheltenham =

British politician (1948–2022)

The Right Honourable The Lord Jones of Cheltenham
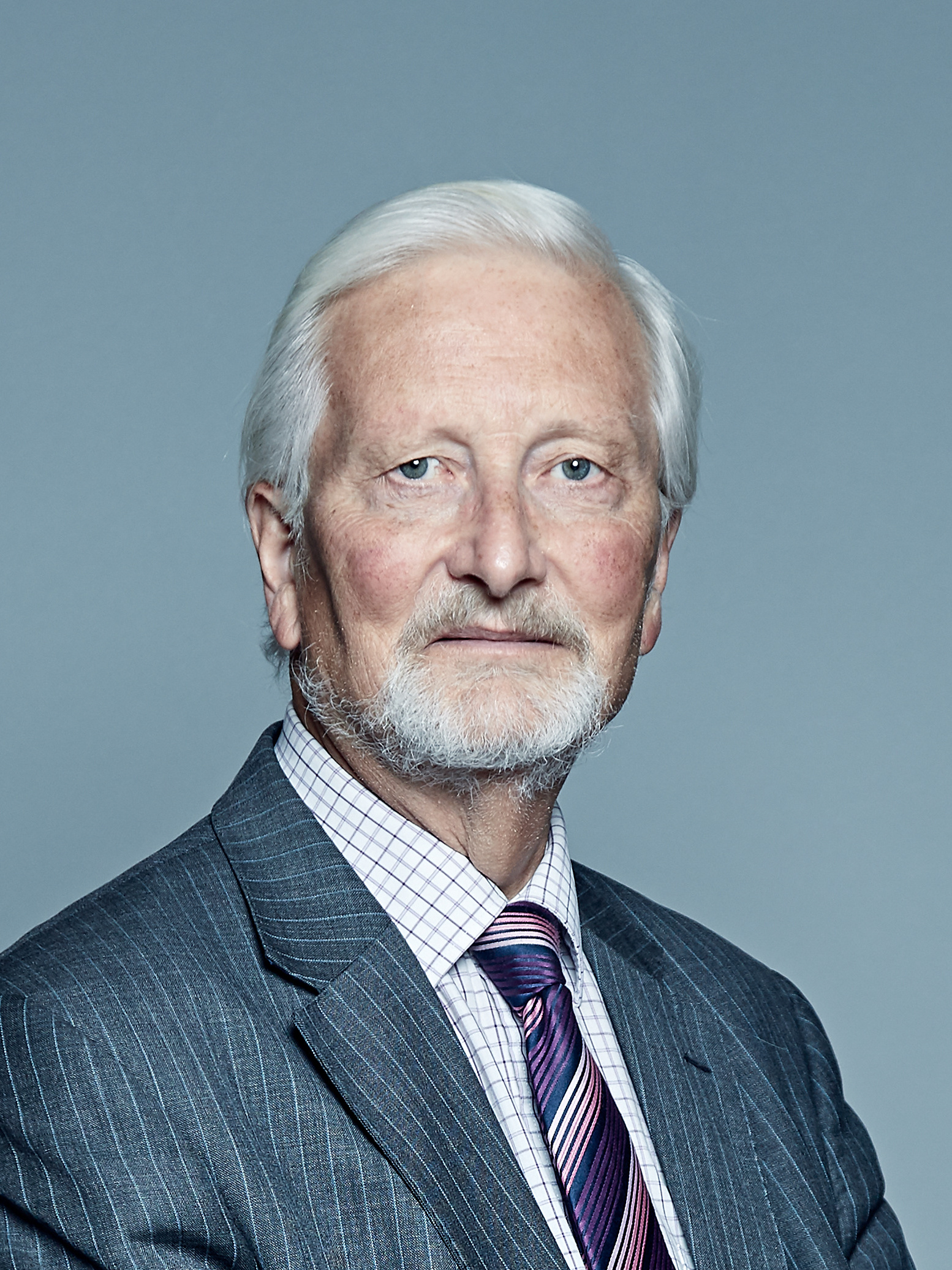
- Official portrait, 2017

Member of the House of Lords
- Lord Temporal
- Life peerage 20 June 2005 – 7 November 2022

Member of Parliament for Cheltenham
- In office 9 April 1992 – 11 April 2005
- Preceded by: Charles Irving
- Succeeded by: Martin Horwood

Personal details
- Born: Nigel David Jones; 30 March 1948 Cheltenham, Gloucestershire, England
- Died: 7 November 2022 (aged 74)
- Party: Liberal Democrats (after 1988)
- Other political affiliations: Liberal (before 1988)
- Spouse: Katherine Grinnell (m. 1981)
- Children: 3
- Occupation: Politician

Nigel David Jones, Baron Jones of Cheltenham (30 March 1948 – 7 November 2022) was a British Liberal Democrat politician who served as a Member of Parliament (MP) from the 1992 general election until the 2005 general election, and as a member of the House of Lords from 2005 until his death in 2022.

== Early life ==
Nigel Jones was born in Cheltenham on 30 March 1948. He attended Prince Henry's Grammar School, Evesham. After leaving school, he worked as a computer operator for Westminster Bank from 1965 to 1967, and then as a computer programmer at International Computers Limited (ICL) from 1967 to 1970. From 1970 to 1971, he worked as a systems analyst at Vehicle and General Insurance, and as a systems programmer at Atkins Computing, before he rejoined ICL as a project manager in 1971. From 1989, Jones was a councillor on Gloucestershire County Council. He resigned from both ICL and Gloucestershire County Council in 1992, when he was elected to Parliament.

== Parliamentary career ==
Jones was elected as the Member of Parliament (MP) for Cheltenham as a Liberal Democrat at the 1992 general election, winning the seat from the Conservative Party. He had previously contested the seat unsuccessfully as a Liberal Party candidate at the 1979 general election.

Jones was a member of the public accounts committee from 2002 to 2005. He was also the Liberal Democrat spokesperson for a number of topics, including local government (1992–93), sport science and technology (1993), consumer affairs (1995-97), sport and culture (1997–99), trade and industry (1997–99) and international development (1999). Jones retained the seat until standing down at the 2005 general election.

== Attack and killing of Andrew Pennington ==
On 28 January 2000, a man, later identified as Robert Ashman, entered Jones's constituency office and attacked him and his assistant, local County councillor Andrew Pennington, with a katana. As a result of the attack, Pennington was killed, and Jones was severely injured. Jones required 57 stitches to close wounds to his hand from the assault.

Jones had written a character reference for Ashman when Ashman was nearly jailed after breaking the ribs of a tax collector in 1992. After the attack at Jones's office, Ashman was charged with manslaughter and attempted murder, but the jury at his trial found him to be mentally unfit to stand trial. He was detained in Broadmoor for observation, and the Home Office authorised a further trial in September 2002. He was subsequently found guilty of attempted murder, and he admitted to Pennington's manslaughter on the grounds of diminished responsibility in 2003.

Pennington was posthumously awarded the George Medal for his attempts to protect Jones.

== Peerage ==
On 13 May 2005, it was announced that Jones would be created a life peer, and he was subsequently elevated to the peerage on 20 June 2005 as Baron Jones of Cheltenham, of Cheltenham in the County of Gloucestershire. As well as many outside interests, he acted as a non-executive consultant for BFC Marcomms Ltd, a Wiltshire-based public relations consultancy.

== Personal life and death ==
Jones married Katherine Grinnell in 1981 at the British Embassy, Abu Dhabi. They had a son, Sam, and twin daughters, Amy and Lucy. Jones died during heart surgery on 7 November 2022, at the age of 74.

== Arms ==
Coat of arms of Nigel Jones, Baron Jones of Cheltenham
Adopted 2006 Coronet Coronet of a Baron Crest A demi Black Rhinoceros Vert armed and supporting with the feet a Welsh Triple Harp Or Escutcheon Per pale Gules and Vert three Mice sejant Argent supporting with the forefeet an Abacus Or Supporters On either side a Hippopotamus statant erect and with mouth agape that on the dexter Vert and that on the sinister Gules both tusked and gorged with an Ancient Crown attached thereto a Chain reflexed over the back Or Motto STRENGTH THROUGH KNOWLEDGE Badge The Head of a Hippopotamus caboshed per pale Vert and Gules crowned with an Ancient Coronet Or Symbolism The mouse and abacus represent a computer. Hippos and rhino were a personal preference and the Welsh harp represents both Wales and the grantee's love of music.

== In popular culture ==
In Official Secrets, a 2019 British-American docudrama film, Jones is portrayed by Chris Larkin.

Parliament of the United Kingdom
Preceded by Charles Irving	Member of Parliament for Cheltenham; 1992–2005	Succeeded by Martin Horwood
