= Hesters Way =

Area in Cheltenham, Gloucestershire, England

Coordinates: 51°54′30″N 2°7′0″W

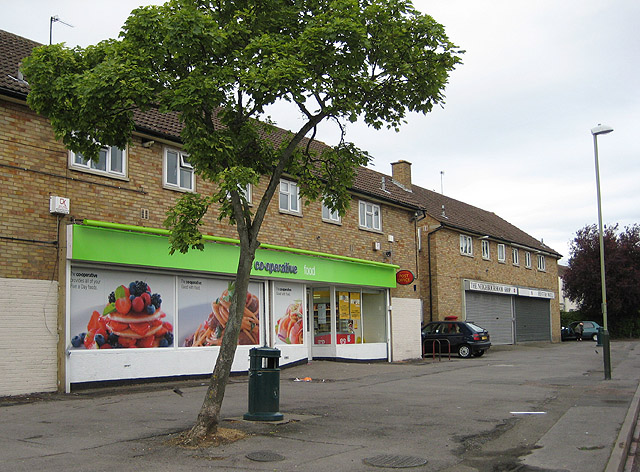
Hester's Way Post Office

Cheltenham West is an area in the western part of Cheltenham, Gloucestershire, England. It is the generic name for an area which includes the council wards of Hesters Way, Springbank, Arle, Rowanfield, Alstone, Fiddlers Green, St Mark's and some of St Peter's and the Moors.

This area has a population of about 30,000 and includes large amounts of social housing.

== Retail ==
Coronation Square shopping centre is at the centre of Cheltenham West and includes supermarkets, an optician, a dental practice, charity shops, betting shops and a variety of fast food outlets. After a number of years of decline, a regeneration programme for the shopping centre was started in 2013. More recent signs of new life include the opening of the Cheltenham Science Centre and innovative new business Create on the Square. There is also a public library with a GrowthHub satellite business hub.

== History ==
Much of the area was originally built as a Wimpey no-fines council area in the 1950s and 1960s as part of a national initiative to increase housing post WW2. The houses provided accommodation for a variety of people, including those working for GCHQ, which arrived in 1952, and local engineering companies. Changes that took place over the following thirty years adversely affected the area and reflected changes in society in general. Owner occupation, structural changes in the economy and the make up of the housing stock and subsequent housing allocations led to a concentration of relative poverty in this area of predominantly social housing.

The earliest use of the term “Cheltenham West” to describe the area was around 2016, when local volunteers established the Cheltenham West community website and newsletter. Prior to that, the area was often referred to as Hesters Way or West Cheltenham, both titles being geographically inaccurate, but also carrying the negative image historically associated with them.

== Regeneration ==
Cheltenham West wards, particularly Hesters Way, have been the focus of regeneration since the 1990s, with projects like the Hesters Way Neighbourhood Project establishing resource and community centres.

In 2017, Cheltenham Borough Council and Cheltenham Borough Homes instigated a joint “Cheltenham West Vision” listening project. Local residents were invited to give their views on a new vision for the area. The Vision also consolidated the designation of “Cheltenham West” to describe the area.

In addition, several new private housing developments have been completed. The largest of these being on the site vacated by GCHQ, when it moved to its new site, also located in Hesters Way.

== India and Pakistan House ==
India and Pakistan House were built February 1959: Two eight-storey blocks of flats approved for Hester's Way providing 78 homes. They were heralded as monuments to modern architecture.

1960: The first residents move in.

July 1984: Cheltenham Borough Council carries out £100,000 of repairs to the outer cladding.

November 1989: India House residents complain lifts have been out of action for two weeks.

January 1993: More than 100 residents are evacuated after fire breaks out in Pakistan House.

December 1993: Tenants say the reputation of the flats has been tarred by vandalism, muggings and fears of fire.

July 2004: Council leaders vote to demolish India and Pakistan House.

November 2004: Fire breaks out in India House. The council unveils plans to turn the flats into bed and breakfast accommodation.

September 2005: The flats feature in two episodes of BBC1 drama Casualty .

January 2006: The flats are earmarked for demolition

Overall the blocks of flats were demolished due to the high crime and low maintenance of the blocks. The demolition of several blocks of council flats (most recently Pakistan House and India House) which were derelict and deemed an eyesore. They are systematically being replaced by a mix of private and housing association houses and flats.
