= Glenys Thornton, Baroness Thornton =

British politician (born 1952)

The Right Honourable The Baroness Thornton
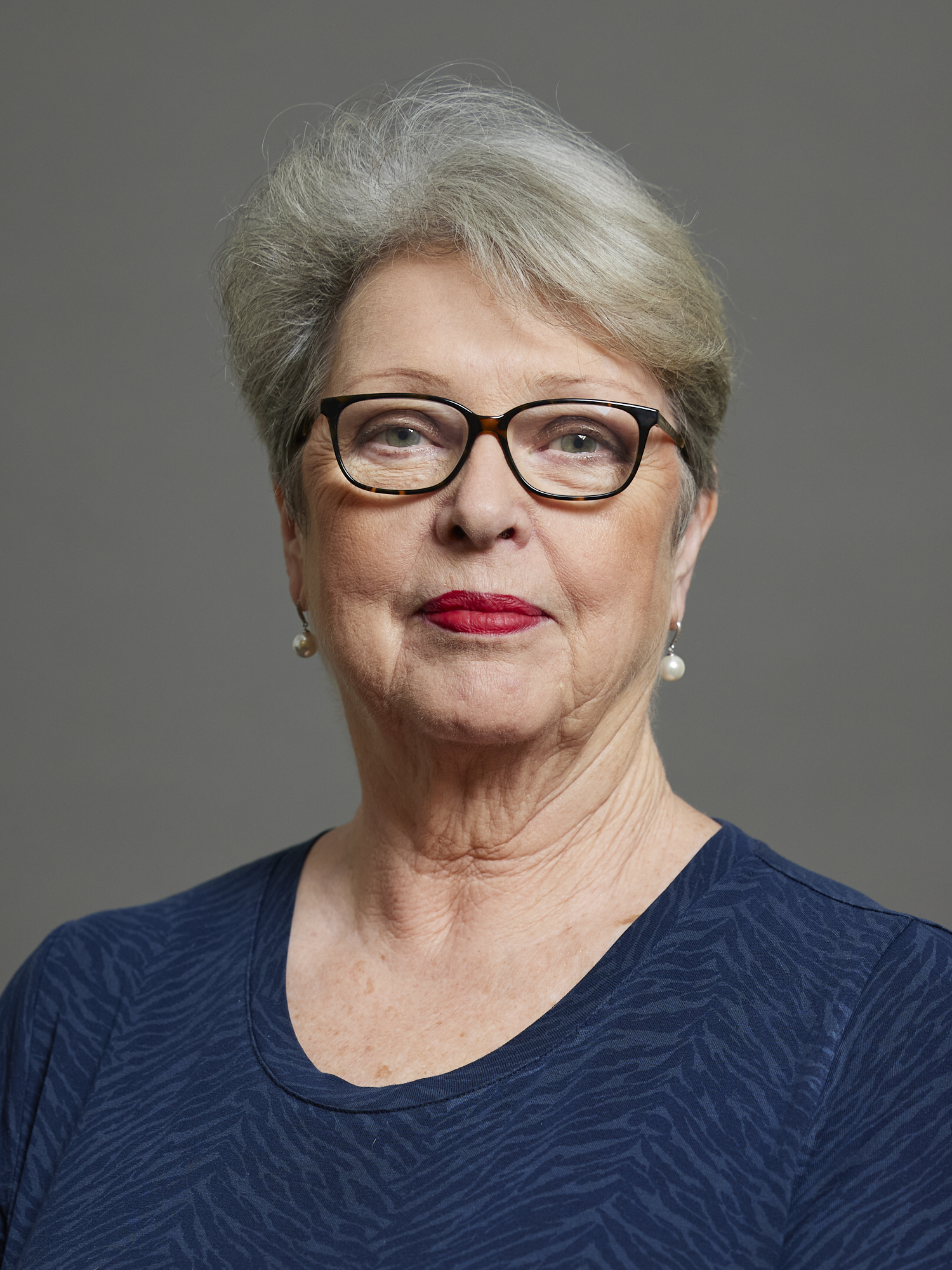
- Official portrait, 2023

Parliamentary Under-Secretary of State for Health
- In office 19 February 2010 – 6 May 2010
- Prime Minister: Gordon Brown
- Preceded by: The Lord Darzi of Denham
- Succeeded by: The Earl Howe

Baroness-in-Waiting Government Whip
- In office 18 February 2008 – 19 February 2010
- Prime Minister: Gordon Brown
- Preceded by: The Baroness Royall of Blaisdon
- Succeeded by: The Baroness Garden of Frognal

Member of the House of Lords
- Lord Temporal
- Life peerage 23 July 1998
Shadow portfolios
2023–present	Culture, Media and Sport
2021–present	Women and Equalities
2023–2023	Work and Pensions
2023–2023	Education
2017–2022	Health and Social Care
2011–2015	Women and Equalities
2010–2012	Health

Personal details
- Born: Dorothea Glenys Thornton; 16 October 1952 (age 74)
- Party: Labour Co-op
- Education: London School of Economics (BSc)

Dorothea Glenys Thornton, Baroness Thornton (born 16 October 1952), known as Glenys Thornton, is a British politician serving as a Member of the House of Lords since 1998. A member of the Labour and Co-operative parties, she was a Government Whip and Health Minister between 2008 and 2010.

== Career ==
Thornton was raised in Bradford, and graduated from the London School of Economics. She was Political Secretary of the Royal Arsenal Co-operative Society from 1981, joining the public affairs team of the Co-operative Wholesale Society upon their merger in 1985 and working there until 1992. She was General Secretary of the Fabian Society from 1993 to 1996. She is a vice president of the Fabian Society. Since June 2015 she has been Chief Executive of the Young Foundation.

On 23 July 1998 Thornton was created a Life peer by Tony Blair, with the title Baroness Thornton, of Manningham in the County of West Yorkshire. She chaired the Social Enterprise Coalition until January 2008, when she was appointed a junior minister of the House of Lords. In September 2007, she was made chair of the advisory group that trains public sector staff to work with the voluntary sector. In May 2012, her role in Labour was moved from health to equalities, with her role on the health portfolio being taken over by Lord Hunt.

In 2019, she welcomed the Equality and Human Rights Commission response to complaints by the Jewish Labour Movement and Campaign Against Antisemitism about alleged antisemitism in the Labour Party in a tweet to Kate Osamor MP, confusing her with another female black MP, Dawn Butler, the Shadow Women & Equalities Secretary.

== Personal life ==
Thornton lives in Gospel Oak, North London, and is married to John Carr. They have two adult children.

She is an Honorary Associate of the National Secular Society.

In 2009, she was reported to be claiming £22,000 a year in expenses by saying that her mother's bungalow in Yorkshire is her main home, amounting to around £130,000 between 2002 and 2009. She was later cleared of any wrongdoing by Michael Pownall, the Clerk of Parliaments, after it was determined that she spent much of her time there while caring for her mother.

Party political offices
Preceded by Arthur Latham	Chair of the London Labour Party; 1986–1991	Succeeded by Jim Fitzpatrick
Preceded by Simon Crine	Acting General Secretary of the Fabian Society; 1993–1994	Succeeded by Simon Crine
Orders of precedence in the United Kingdom
Preceded by The Baroness Buscombe	Gentlemen; Baroness Thornton	Followed by The Baroness Crawley
