= Noel Hudson =

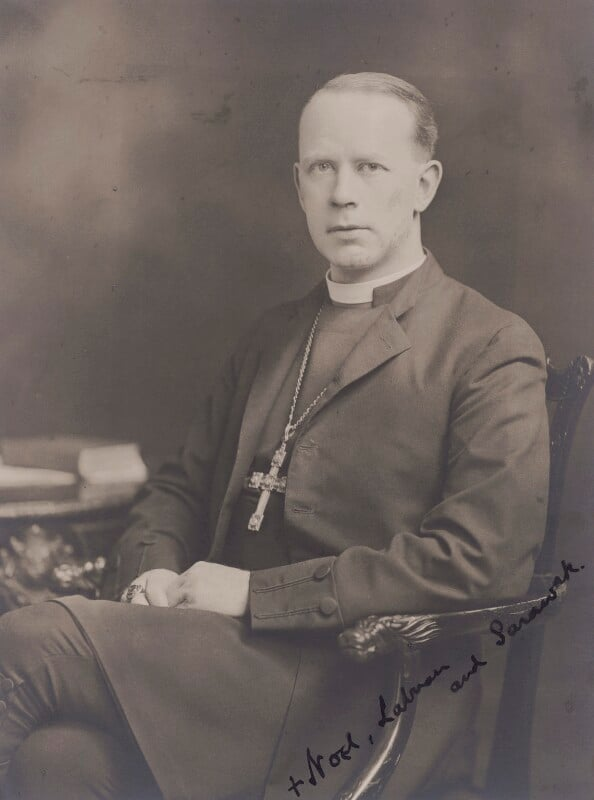
Hudson, c. 1920s

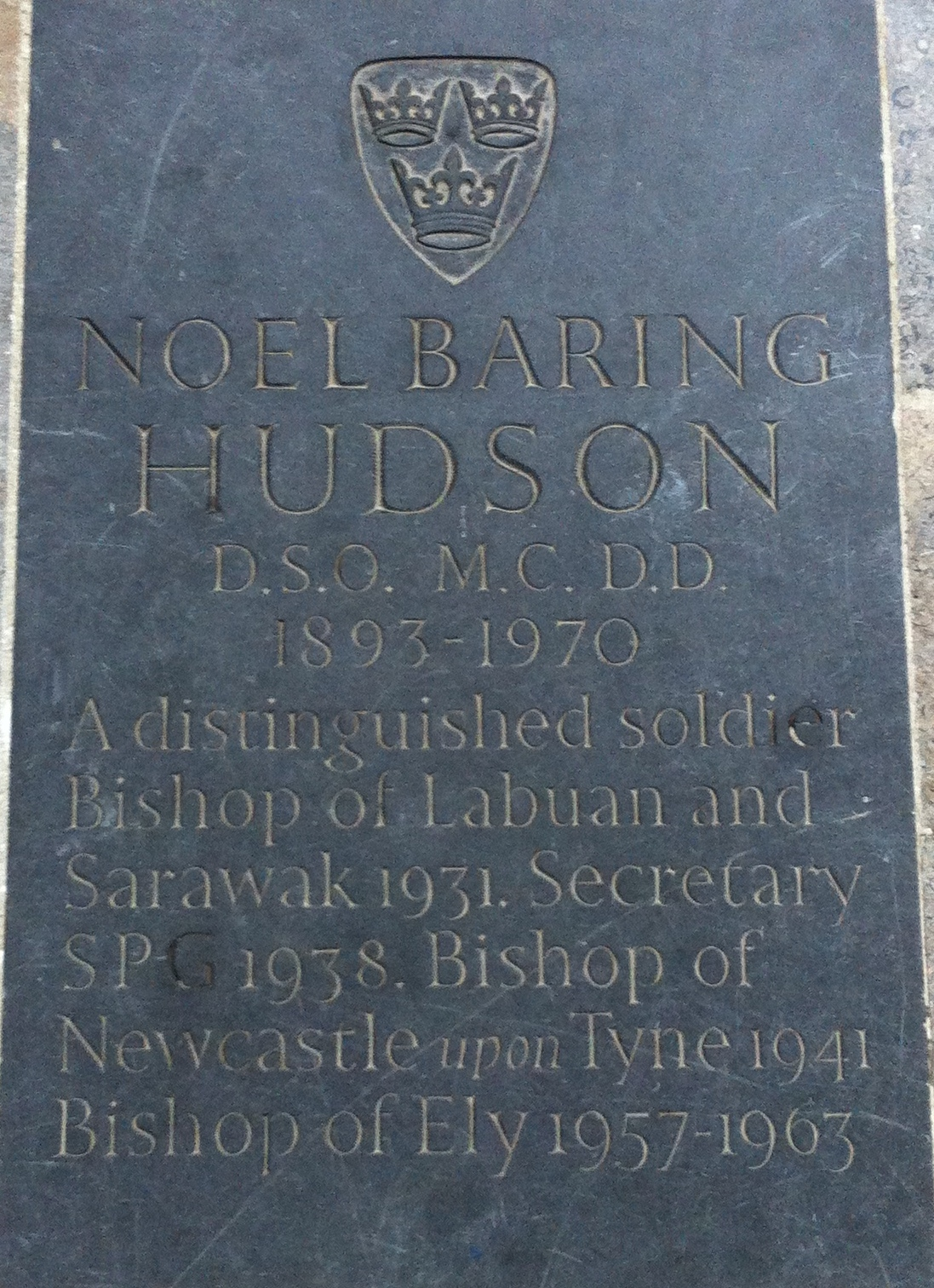
Memorial to Bishop Noel Baring Hudson in Ely Cathedral

Noel Baring Hudson DSO MC (18 December 1893 – 5 October 1970) was a British Anglican priest who over thirty years served as bishop of Labuan and Sarawak, Newcastle and Ely. He was also a first-class Rugby Union player and decorated soldier during World War I.

Hudson was born on 18 December 1893, the sixth son of the Reverend Thomas Hudson and his wife Alethea Matheson. His maternal grandmother, Alethea Hayter, was the sister of statistician Henry Heylyn Hayter and of engineer Harrison Hayter, while Hudson's sister, Elizabeth, would marry Frederick Gordon-Lennox, 9th Duke of Richmond. Noel was educated at St Edward's School, Oxford, where his father had been headmaster, and went on to Christ's College, Cambridge, where he was Tancred Student.

In 1914, on the outbreak of World War I, Hudson joined the Royal Berkshire Regiment. The war saw two of his brothers killed and another wounded. Hudson himself ended as an acting brigadier having been awarded a DSO and Bar and an MC and Bar and being twice Mentioned in Despatches, having been wounded in fifteen places. For the DSO the following citation was given:

For consistent gallantry and able leadership, particularly on 8 August 1918, south of Morlancourt, when he personally led his battalion forward to the attack through heavy fog and intense shell and machine gun fire. When they were held up by machine guns he pushed forward alone, knocking out one of the machine guns and getting wounded in doing so. In spite of this, he rushed two other machine guns which were holding up the advance, and continued to lead his battalion forward until he was again seriously wounded by machine-gun fire in three places. He showed splendid courage and determination.

By 1914, Hudson had already shown promise as a rugby union running standoff half and centre threequarter. He played for Harlequin F.C.and Cambridge University and seems to have narrowly missed a Blue. In 1919, having recovered from war wounds, he was captain of Harlequins but again failed to gain a coveted Blue despite appearing regularly in the XV. He would later play for Headingley and Yorkshire.

After the war, Hudson attended Westcott House, Cambridge, then Leeds Clergy School, and in 1921 began his ordained ministry in the parish of Christ Church, Leeds. In 1922 he became vicar of the same parish. After four years in Leeds he was appointed to St John the Baptist in Newcastle upon Tyne. There he distinguished himself in setting a pattern of one paramount, uniting Parish Eucharist for the whole family every Sunday morning instead of five separate services and in social work including converting decaying flats into decent accommodation with modest rents for poor families. In 1931, at the age of 39, he became Bishop of Labuan and Sarawak for seven years. The diocese covered an area as large as the UK, but travelling was tortuous, by launch, canoe and on foot along jungle paths in tropical heat. Hudson's main task was to unite the work of the Mission Stations in the diocese at which he had some success. In 1938 he was recalled to become secretary of the Society for the Propagation of the Gospel in Foreign Parts, which post Archbishop Lang told Hudson that he regarded as Chief of Staff to the Anglican Communion. In 1940, Hudson was sent to the United States to receive a $300,000 donation from the American Episcopal Church to support overseas dioceses. Having briefly served as liaision officer for Kermit Roosevelt during the war, Hudson leveraged this connection for a lecture tour. In 1939 he had become an honorary canon and an assistant bishop in the Diocese of St Albans and was also Select Preacher in Cambridge. On 2 October 1941 he was nominated and on 19 October confirmed as Bishop of Newcastle where he remained for nearly 16 years. He was a greatly-admired Bishop and continued a Newcastle tradition as 'one of the happiest places for a priest to work'. In Hudson's time there as Bishop, young men were attracted to starting careers in the diocese: John Ramsbotham was later Bishop of Wakefield, Hugh Montefiore became Bishop of Birmingham and Robert Runcie was appointed Archbishop of Canterbury in 1979. Hudson 'saw his episcopate primarily in terms of the care and leadership of the clergy. It was the job of the parish priest to care for his own people'.

In 1957, Hudson was appointed Bishop of Ely after miscommunication between Archbishop Fisher and the new patronage secretary of Prime Minister Harold Macmillan led to the latter overruling Fisher's recommendations for Hudson to fill the vacancies at Peterborough and Lincoln. This resulted in the ageing, shy and increasingly deaf Hudson being placed where his late predecessor had clashed with the cathedral, and despite putting on 'a boisterous bonhomie which was sometimes misunderstood' he had a difficult time, but continued until retiring in 1963. Hudson's last years were spent in a flat in Maida Vale and he died on 5 October 1970.
