= List of expenses claims in the United Kingdom parliamentary expenses scandal =

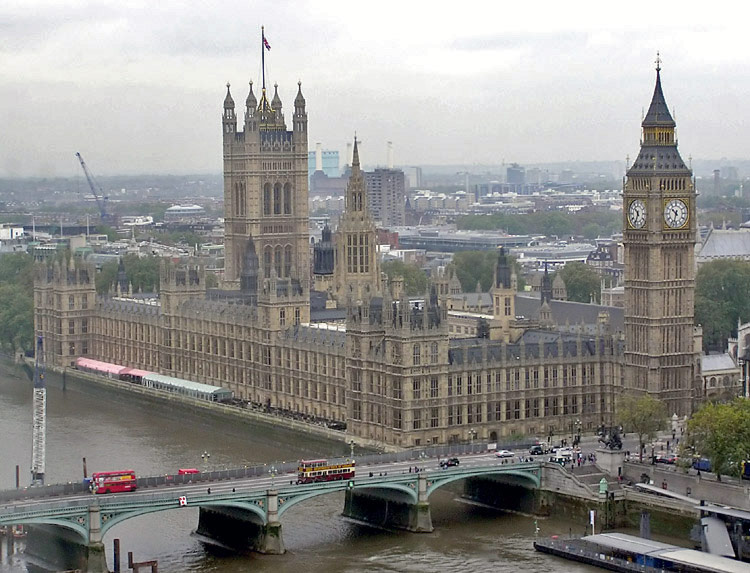
The Palace of Westminster, in which the Houses of Parliament are based

This article lists the published allegations of expenses abuse made against specific members of the British Parliament in the course of the United Kingdom parliamentary expenses scandal. While the majority of these were first made public by The Daily Telegraph on or after 8 May 2009, a few cases had already come to public attention before that date.

On 18 June 2009 the details of all MP's claims for the period 2004 to 2008 were published on the official Parliament website together with details of voluntary repayments amounting to approximately £500,000.

== Items that became public before 8 May 2009 ==
=== The John Lewis List ===
The John Lewis List is the name given to a list used by House of Commons Clerks to ascertain whether or not claims by MPs under the Additional Costs Allowance (ACA) are a realistic representation of the price of items. The list details items that are considered acceptable to be claimed on the ACA, along with the price such items would cost in the John Lewis department store chain.

Prior to 2008 the list was never published in case MPs saw the maximum permitted claim for each item and such a price "became the going rate", a rule House of Commons' resources chief Andrew Walker upheld in February 2008 despite campaigners wanting it released to the Information Tribunal considering the release of MPs' expenses claims. However, a freedom of information request by the Press Association just a month later, in March 2008, saw the list released into the public domain anyway, revealing that MPs were able to claim for, among other things, dishwashers, television sets and tumble dryers.

=== Derek Conway ===
Derek Conway, the MP for Old Bexley and Sidcup then under the Conservative whip, was found to have employed his son, Frederick, as a part-time research assistant in his parliamentary office between 2004 and 2007, with an annual salary of £10,000, despite Frederick being a full-time undergraduate student at Newcastle University. This arrangement was revealed by The Sunday Times on 27 May 2007, in an article which prompted a complaint to the Parliamentary Commissioner for Standards, who in turn referred the matter to the House of Commons Standards and Privileges Committee.

The committee launched an investigation into the matter as a whole, and reported to the House on 28 January 2008. On the same day, Conway apologised on the floor of the Commons, stating that he accepted the report's criticisms "in full". The report's main finding was that there was "no record" of Frederick ever doing any substantive work for Conway, and that the salary he was paid was too high. The committee ordered Conway to repay £13,000 of the money Frederick had been paid, and recommended that Conway should be suspended from the Commons for ten sitting days. These recommendations were approved, in their entirety, by the House of Commons on 31 January 2008.

At the time of Conway's suspension, the Labour MP John Mann announced that he would be making a complaint to the Parliamentary Commissioner for Standards over Conway's employment of his other son, Henry, in a similar capacity to Frederick. Shortly after Conway's suspension and the second allegation being made, the Conservative leader, David Cameron, withdrew the party whip from Conway, effectively leaving him sitting as an independent MP. Conway subsequently announced that he would not be standing for re-election at the next general election.

In January 2009, a year after the first report, the Committee on Standards and Privileges published a further report, specifically in relation to Conway's employment of his son Henry. The committee found that Henry had been employed immediately prior to Frederick and, similarly, had been studying as a full-time undergraduate at the time of his employment. The committee reported that, like the previous case, there was no "hard evidence" of Henry's employment, but also stated that

[I]t would be unfair to conclude that Henry Conway did not undertake sufficient work to fulfil the terms of his contract of employment.

The committee ordered Conway to repay £3,758 in overpayments to his son, and to also write a letter of apology to the committee's chairman, Sir George Young. Once again, Conway apologised "without qualification" to the Commons.

=== Caroline Spelman ===
Caroline Spelman, the then Chairman of the Conservative Party, became embroiled in the "nannygate" saga on 6 June 2008 when the BBC's Newsnight programme suggested she had paid for her nanny out of parliamentary expenses during her early years in Parliament, between 1997 and 1998. Spelman issued a statement to Newsnight that the nanny in question, Tina Haynes, was also her constituency secretary. The Conservative Central Office agreed with her claim. Immediately after the revelations were made public, the nanny told Newsnight that she only took the odd phone message or posted documents when needed. In the following days, however, Haynes stated that her work had, in fact, been on a more formal basis, providing constituency secretarial work when Spelman's children were at school.

In an attempt to resolve the situation and clear her name, Spelman asked John Lyons, the Parliamentary Commissioner for Standards, to investigate the payments to Haynes. However, the commissioner himself suggested that an investigation dating back seven years would be exceptional, especially on a self-referral. Despite this, the commissioner announced on 17 June that he would launch a formal investigation into the saga.

During the commissioner's investigation, Newsnight revealed that nine years earlier, Spelman's parliamentary secretary, Sally Hammond, had raised concerns over the "nannygate" payments with the leadership of the Conservative party. In 1998, Hammond informed Peter Ainsworth, a member of the Shadow Cabinet, who in turn referred the matter to the then Opposition Chief Whip, James Arbuthnot, who investigated and told Spelman to stop paying Haynes out of parliamentary expenses immediately.

In March 2009, the Committee for Standards and Privileges published their final report into the matter, which ruled that Spelman had inadvertently "misapplied part of [her] parliamentary allowances". However, both the Committee and the Commissioner noted that Spelman was, at the time, one of many new members who had taken their seats following the 1997 general election, and was therefore not fully aware of the rules governing the use or purpose of parliamentary allowances. The committee recommended that Spelman repay £9,600.

=== Ed Balls and Yvette Cooper ===
In September 2007, the married couple and Labour Cabinet ministers, Ed Balls, the Secretary of State for Children, Schools and Families, and Yvette Cooper, then the Housing Minister, used the Commons' allowances system to pay for a £655,000 house in Stoke Newington, North London. The couple subsequently declared this to be their second home, despite spending most of their time in London in order to fulfil their ministerial responsibilities and their children attending London schools. The declaration of the Stoke Newington property as their second home meant that they became eligible for a reported Additional Costs Allowance (ACA) of £44,000 a year to cover the property's £438,000 mortgage.

The Conservative MP Malcolm Moss made a complaint to the Parliamentary Commissioner for Standards, who agreed to launch an investigation into the matter. The commissioner ultimately found that the couple had acted in accordance with parliamentary rules and as such dismissed the complaint against them. The Committee on Standards and Privileges agreed with the Commissioner's dismissal of the complaint.

=== Nicholas and Ann Winterton ===
Nicholas and Ann Winterton, the married backbench Conservative MPs, were accused of claiming back mortgage interest through the Additional Cost Allowance (ACA) on a flat they owned in London, despite having completed payment of the mortgage itself. It was further alleged that the pair had subsequently transferred the ownership of the flat to a trust and then claimed £21,600 a year in rent for the flat.

A complaint was made about this arrangement by two members of the public to the Parliamentary Commissioner for Standards, who in turn launched an investigation. The commissioner found that a change in the allowances rules in 2003 appeared to complicate matters as it may have placed the Wintertons' arrangement outside of the rules, and ruled it was "unfortunate" that the couple never reassessed their situation following the change in rules. The commissioner also ruled that a further change to allowance rules in 2006 meant that there was a clear breach of the rules, but noted that the Wintertons would not have received any additional public funds for their arrangement than they would have if they had resided in a different property under more acceptable arrangements. It was also noted that the Wintertons had never attempted to conceal the arrangement. The Committee on Standards and Privileges agreed with the Commissioner's report and ruled that the payment of the Additional Costs Allowance to the Wintertons should be stopped. Notably however, they did not order the Wintertons to repay any money they had previously claimed.

In a separate debate, the Wintertons are two of only six Conservative MPs who have refused to disclose their full expenses claims, despite orders to do so by party leader, David Cameron.

=== Jacqui Smith ===
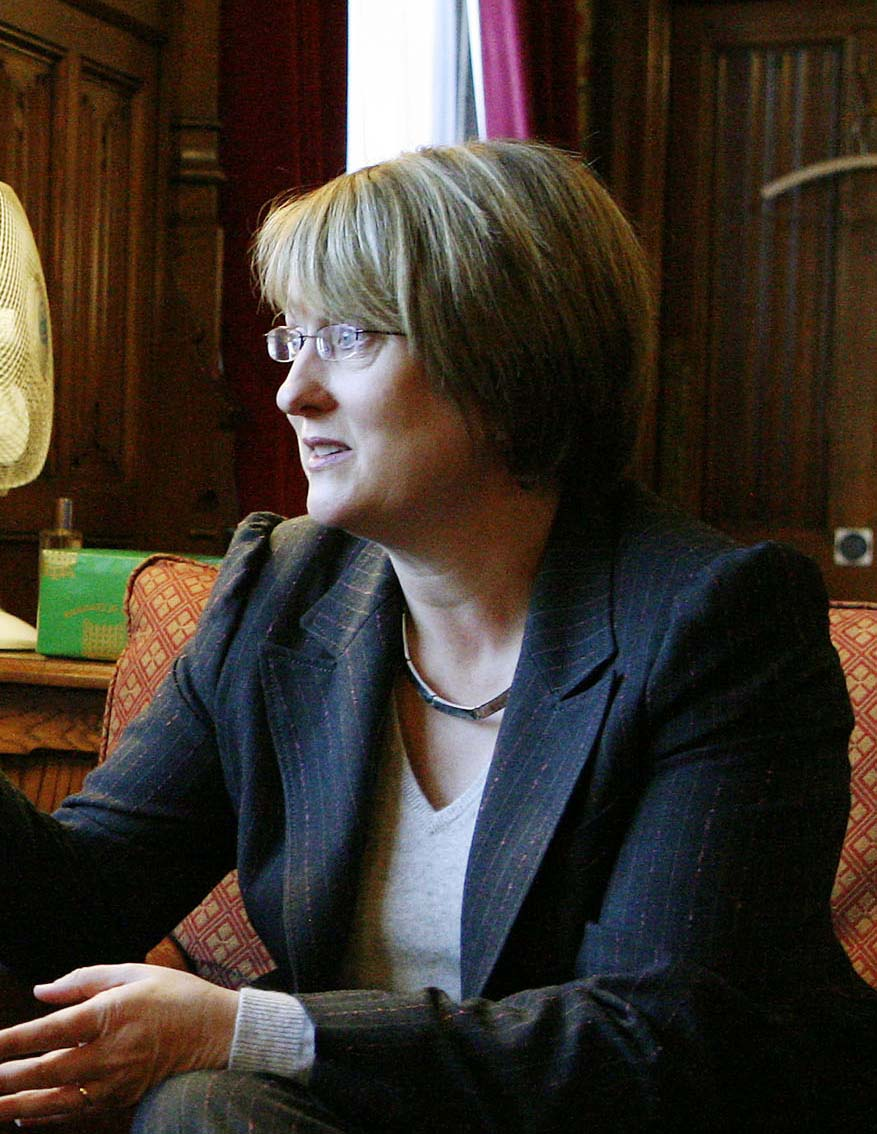
Jacqui Smith, then Home Secretary

In February 2009, The Mail on Sunday reported that the Home Secretary, Jacqui Smith, had listed her constituency home in Redditch, Worcestershire as her second home, whilst designating a house she shared with her sister in London as her main home, despite sometimes spending as little as two nights there, allowing her to claim £116,000 in Additional Cost Allowance over several years. A key aspect in the debate was the fact that Smith, as Home Secretary, was eligible for a "grace and favour" home in Westminster, and therefore did not need to claim expenses to live with her sister. After the residents of the house next-door to Smith's sister complained to the Parliamentary Commissioner for Standards, stating that Smith may only stay there for three nights a week, he requested that Smith explain her arrangements.

A month after allegations were made against Smith's second home arrangements, the Sunday Express revealed that Smith had claimed as parliamentary expenses for two Pay-TV pornographic films her husband, Richard Timney, had watched while she was away. Smith and her husband both apologised for the error, and Smith said she would pay back the claim. This, coupled with the previous allegation, led to mounting pressure of Smith to resign, but the prime minister, Gordon Brown, gave her his full support, before proposing alterations to the existing expenses system.

In April 2009, Smith came under increasing pressure after yet further questions were raised about her expenses by the Mail on Sunday. The newspaper suggested that Smith had claimed for several items that were supposed to allow her to "perform her duties as an MP", including a toothbrush, a patio heater, a barbecue, a flat-screen TV and a bath plug costing 89p. On 2 June 2009, she announced she would stand down at the Cabinet reshuffle on 5 June 2009.

=== Tony McNulty ===
In March 2009, Labour minister Tony McNulty (then Minister for London, Minister for Employment and MP for Harrow East) admitted claiming expenses on a second home, occupied by his parents, which was eight miles away from his primary residence, after details appeared in the Mail on Sunday. He asserted that the claim was appropriate, but ceased claiming the allowances. In an article headlined "Tony McNulty, Benefit Cheat", The Spectator on 26 March 2009 contrasted the statements made by McNulty regarding benefit cheats with his own claims for expenses. He resigned during the Cabinet reshuffle of 5 June 2009.

=== Eric Pickles ===
On 26 March 2009, Conservative MP Eric Pickles (Brentwood and Ongar) appeared on the political debate programme Question Time. While discussing the controversy over Tony McNulty, Pickles admitted he claimed a second home allowance even though his constituency home was only 37 miles from Westminster. Pickles justified himself by saying "the House of Commons works on clockwork. You have to be there. If you're on a committee, you have to be there precisely." Host David Dimbleby responded "Like a job, in other words?" reflecting the reality that many of Pickles' own constituents commute to London each day.

== Items made public on or after 8 May 2009 ==
Amounts to be paid back
Name	To be paid back (£)
Phil Hope	41,709
Margaret Moran	22,500
Elliot Morley	16,000
Hazel Blears	13,332 (to HMRC)
David Chaytor	13,000
Stewart Jackson	11,300
Quentin Davies	10,000
Michael Gove	7,000
Ronnie Campbell	6,200
Alan Duncan	5,000
Richard Younger-Ross	4,000
Andrew Lansley	2,600
Douglas Hogg	2,200
Oliver Letwin	2,000
Gerald Kaufman	1,851
Menzies Campbell	1,490
Shahid Malik	1,050 (to charity)
Julia Goldsworthy	1,005
David Cameron	680
George Osborne	440
Gordon Brown	150
Chris Huhne	119
David Willetts	115
Nick Clegg	82
Lembit Öpik	40
Cheryl Gillan	4

The following details are sorted by party in descending order of parliamentary size of the party at the time of the scandal.

=== Labour Party ===
The Telegraph devoted the first two days of coverage to the expenses of the governing Labour Party, beginning with the Cabinet on day one, before turning to junior ministers and Labour backbenchers on the second day, Saturday 9 May. Further allegations were made on Thursday, 14 May. The main allegations the newspaper made, alongside any responses to them from the various MPs are shown below.

- Gordon Brown (Prime Minister/Labour, Kirkcaldy & Cowdenbeath) – allegedly paid his brother in excess of £6,000 for cleaning services and claimed for the same plumbing repair bill twice. Downing Street responded by saying that Brown paid his brother, who in turn paid the cleaner as the cleaner worked for them both but preferred to be paid by a single person for National Insurance reasons. The cleaner was hired by the Prime Minister's sister-in-law to clean his brother's flat but then expanded her duties to include cleaning the Prime Minister's London flat. Meanwhile, the Commons Fees Office stated that the double payment for a repair bill was a mistake on their part and that Brown had repaid it in full.
- Tony Blair, former prime minister – claimed £6,990 for roof repairs to his constituency home in Sedgefield. He had submitted the invoice dated 8 June 2007 on 25 June – two days before he was replaced as prime minister. He had announced his decision to stand down as prime minister on 10 May 2007.
- Hazel Blears (Secretary of State for Communities and Local Government/Labour, Salford) – claimed for three different London properties in one year and claimed nearly £5,000 for furniture in three months. It is also alleged that she switched her second home designation from her constituency house in Salford to a flat in South London, for which she claimed £800 a month second-home allowance for the mortgage. She is then said to have sold the flat for a £45,000 profit, on which she did not pay capital gains tax, because she advised HM Revenue and Customs that it was in fact her main residence. Blears responded by saying that all her claims were within the rules and that her furniture bill was "reasonable", although she did admit not paying capital gains tax on the property she sold. On 10 May 2009, it was reported that HM Revenue and Customs are to investigate cases of possible capital gains tax evasion by MPs such as Blears. A spokesman for Blears said that there was "no liability" for capital gains tax from the sale. Blears said that the system was "wrong", though she had not broken the rules. She recommended that members of the public meet with an independent body to come to a resolution. On 12 May 2009, Blears told Sky News that she would send a cheque to HM Revenue and Customs for £13,332, the amount of capital gains tax she would have paid had she admitted liability.
- Alistair Darling (Chancellor of the Exchequer/Labour, Edinburgh South West) – changed the designation of his second home four times in four years, allowing him to claim for the costs of his family home in Edinburgh, and to buy and furnish a flat in London including the cost of stamp duty and other legal fees. Darling said that "the claims were made within House of Commons rules". On 1 June 2009 the Telegraph published further allegations suggesting that the Chancellor claimed parliamentary expenses for two properties at the same time a claim that a spokeswoman later said was "wrong".
- Peter Mandelson (Secretary of State for Business, Enterprise and Regulatory Reform/Labour, at the time MP for Hartlepool) billed taxpayers for work carried out on his constituency home after he announced his decision to stand down as an MP in July 2004. His final expenses claim, including £3,235 work on his house, was submitted in December 2004.
- John Prescott (Former Deputy Prime Minister/Labour, Kingston upon Hull East) – reported to have claimed £312 for fitting mock Tudor beams to his constituency home, and for two new toilet seats in as many years. Prescott has not responded to any of the claims.
- David Miliband (Foreign Secretary/Labour, South Shields) – allegedly claimed for gardening expenses and nearly £30,000 in repairs, decorations, and furnishings his family home in South Shields. Miliband has made no comment.
- Jack Straw (Secretary of State for Justice/Labour, Blackburn) – admitted using expenses to claim full council tax bill despite only paying a 50% rate. Straw said he had acted in good faith and had repaid the erroneous claims once he was aware that MPs' expenses were to be made public.
- Phil Woolas (Immigration Minister/Labour, Oldham East and Saddleworth) – reportedly claimed for ladies' clothing, comics and nappies on expenses. Woolas said the items were on a receipt he submitted under food claims, but were not claimed themselves, and threatened the newspaper with legal action.
- Barbara Follett (Tourism Minister/Labour, Stevenage) – reportedly claimed £25,000 in expenses for security patrols at her Soho house over a four-year period after being mugged. Follett responded by saying the claims were within the rules.
- Keith Vaz (Home Affairs Select Committee Chairman/Labour, Leicester East) – allegedly claimed £75,000 for a second home in Westminster despite living in Stanmore, west London, just 12 miles away. Vaz responded by claiming he made no claim in relation to his home in Stanmore which he acquired when he got married.
- Margaret Moran (Backbencher/Labour, Luton South) – claimed £22,500 for treating dry rot in her coastal property in Southampton, 100 miles from her constituency and a two-hour drive from Westminster, just days after making it her designated second home. Moran responded by saying she had done nothing outside of the rules and needed the Southampton property to maintain her family life. Moran also stated that there were "inaccuracies" in the Telegraph reports that were "probably actionable". Appearing on the Politics Show on 10 May 2009, Moran was asked: "why should the taxpayer pay for your home in Southampton when clearly you are not using it for work?". Moran said that such arrangements were necessary in order to allow MPs to have "a proper family life". She insisted that there was nothing wrong with her three homes arrangement and she argued that MPs should have third homes away from London or their constituency where they can relax with their partners, and that this would make them more able MPs. In the days after her expenses were exposed, Moran agreed to pay back the £22,500, saying that she understood constituents' anger.
- Paul Murphy (Secretary of State for Wales/Labour, Torfaen) – Murphy was the only Welsh MP criticised for "claiming" expenses. Murphy claimed for a new boiler, because the one he had was deemed "unsafe", in which the water was too hot. The Telegraph identified that he had claimed £1,799 in stamp duty, £35 for a lavatory holder, £537 for an oven, £1,674 for a carpet, £605 for a new television set, £449 for a sound system, £1.98 for light bulbs, £6 for vacuum cleaner dust bags, and £6 for a tin opener.
- Elliot Morley (a former agriculture minister/Labour, Scunthorpe) – continued claiming mortgage interest on his constituency home, totalling £16,000 over 18 months, after the loan had been repaid. Morley said in response that "I have made a mistake, I apologise for that and I take full responsibility". In November 2007, Morley "flipped" his designated second home from Scunthorpe to a London property he was renting out to another MP Ian Cawsey. For four months Morley claimed full mortgage interest on the London house and Cawsey, who had designated the house as his second home, continued to claim £1,000 a month as rent paid to Morley. The fees office discovered that the two MPs were both claiming for the same property in March 2008 but the arrangements were not reported or independently investigated. In the hours following these allegations being made, it was announced that Morley had been suspended from the Parliamentary Labour Party. The Telegraph also alleged that Morley rented out a London flat designated as his main residence to another Labour MP, Ian Cawsey, a close friend and former special adviser. Cawsey named the property as his second home, allowing him to also claim £1,000 a month in expenses to cover the rent which he was charged by Morley. In November 2007, the newspaper claims Morley "flipped" his designated second home from his Scunthorpe property to his London flat, and for four months the two men claimed expenses on the same property. Morley told BBC News that he had repaid the money two weeks prior to the Telegraph story breaking upon realising he had mistakenly continued claiming for his mortgage payments after the mortgage had been paid off in 2006. On 14 May 2009 he was suspended from the Parliamentary Labour Party because of this scandal. Morley has referred himself to Parliamentary Standards Commissioner John Lyon, in an effort to clear his name. On 29 May 2009 he announced that he would not stand for re-election at the next general election.
- Shahid Malik (Justice minister/Labour, Dewsbury) – Shahid Malik (Justice minister/Labour, Dewsbury) – It was falsely alleged that Malik was paying a discounted rent on his main home in his constituency, and as such in breach of the ministerial code. Within weeks he had been cleared of any wrongdoing following an independent inquiry by Sir Philip Mawer. He was also accused of improper use of a second office in his constituency but after a ten-month inquiry Malik was cleared of abusing his expenses early in April 2010. Malik said the ruling was the end of a "12-month nightmare." He added "I have now been cleared of breaching the ministerial code of conduct by the ministerial standards adviser Sir Philip Mawer, cleared of any abuse of expenses by a parliamentary review conducted by the Department of Resources, and now finally cleared of abusing office expenses by the Parliamentary Commissioner for Standards John Lyon."
- David Chaytor admitted that he had claimed almost £13,000 in interest payments for a mortgage that he had already repaid. On 15 May 2009, the Telegraph reported that between September 2005 and August 2006, Chaytor claimed £1,175 a month for mortgage interest on a Westminster flat. However, Land Registry records show that the mortgage on the flat had already been paid off in January 2004. Chaytor was suspended by the Parliamentary Labour Party following publication of the expenses he had claimed. He said "In respect of mortgage interest payments, there has been an unforgivable error in my accounting procedures for which I apologise unreservedly. I will act immediately to ensure repayment is made to the Fees Office". On 3 December 2010 he pleaded guilty to charges of false accounting in relation to parliamentary expenses claims and he was sentenced to 18 months imprisonment on 7 January 2011.
- David Clelland "bought out" his partner's share of a joint mortgage on a flat in London in a deal which cost the taxpayer thousands of pounds plus legal fees. After the deal, which was approved by the Commons fees office, his taxpayer-funded mortgage interest payments increased by almost £200 a month. Mr Clelland, who cited the "increasingly bureaucratic" nature of the expenses system and fears of "press intrusion" as reasons for ending the joint mortgage, also submitted a claim including 36p for fuses.
- Gerald Kaufman submitted a claim for three months' expenses totalling £14,301.60, which included £8,865 for a Bang & Olufsen Beovision 40-inch LCD television in June 2006. The maximum amount MPs are allowed to claim for TVs is £750 as no luxury item allowed. Most of the expenses of Kaufman were spent on repairs of his second flat in Regents Park, London which he depicts as a "decrepit" and "old flat" with "out of date" facilities that had "not carried out any repairs/maintenance for 32 years".
- Ben Chapman admitted that he was allowed to continue claiming for interest payments on his entire mortgage after repaying £295,000 of the loan in 2002. Over 10 months the arrangement allowed Mr Chapman to receive £15,000 for the part of the home loan which had been paid off. Following publication of the claims Chapman said he would not give back the money. Permission to claim "phantom" mortgage payments is understood to have been offered to several MPs before 2004. It was stopped after Commons officials admitted it should never have been allowed.
- Ian Gibson claimed mortgage payments on a London flat while, according to claims by the Telegraph newspaper, his daughter and her partner lived there full-time without paying rent. He subsequently sold the property to his daughter at an undervalue.
- Quentin Davies claimed £10,000 of taxpayers' money for repairs to window frames at his "second home", an 18th-century mansion, while staying at his "main home", a flat near Westminster. It is notable that this allegation against a Labour MP appeared in the Sunday Mirror, a newspaper known to support the Labour Party.

=== Conservative Party ===
Although focusing on Labour MPs on days one and two, on the evening of 10 May, the Telegraph website reported that the newspaper was preparing to publish the expenses claims of Conservative MPs in the next day's edition. It also began publishing the stories online that evening. The day after these particular revelations began, the Leader of the Opposition, David Cameron, announced that all questionable claims by the Shadow Cabinet would be repaid, including those made by Michael Gove, Oliver Letwin, Francis Maude and Chris Grayling. Cameron himself repaid a £680 repair bill that included the clearing of wisteria from his chimney.

On the evening of 11 May, the Daily Telegraph announced it was turning its attention on the claims of backbench Conservative MPs whom the newspaper dubbed "the grandees" of the party.

Those claims and further revelations are listed below:

- Michael Ancram (Conservative, Devizes) – said to have claimed on expenses for servicing of his swimming pool's boiler, as well as gardening, cleaning and a housekeeper at his constituency home. Ancram replied by agreeing to repay the £98 boiler servicing claim, but maintained that "none of the other items were extravagant or luxurious".
- James Arbuthnot (Conservative, North East Hampshire) – reported to have claimed for maintenance on the swimming pool at his constituency home, a claim that he accepted was "an error of judgment" and one which he would repay.
- Gregory Barker (Shadow Energy & Climate Change Minister/Conservative, Bexhill & Battle) – sold a London flat which he had purchased using expenses for a profit of £327,000. Barker responded by saying the newspaper had failed to take into account the fact that he had invested a "significant amount" of his own money.
- Bill Cash (Conservative, Stone) – it was reported on 28 May 2009 that Cash had claimed £15,000 which he then paid to his daughter, a prospective Conservative candidate, as rent for a Notting Hill flat, when he had a flat of his own a few miles away and closer to Westminster. Cash defended these expenses by claiming that it was done within the rules and that "It was only for a year".
- David Davis (Former Shadow Home Secretary/Conservative, Haltemprice & Howden) – reportedly claimed in excess of £10,000 over four years for home improvements, including £5,700 for a portico at his Yorkshire house. Davis responded that his previous portico had sustained severe water damage, necessitating the building of a new one.
- Jonathan Djanogly (Shadow Business Minister & Shadow Solicitor General/Conservative, Huntingdon) - claimed £5,000 for security gates on his constituency home as well as £13,962 for cleaning expenses and a further £12,951 for gardening costs. Djanogly commented that "The automatic gates are integrated with a CCTV system which I installed with police advice after I had security threats following from my representation of constituents' interests at Huntingdon Life Sciences."
- Alan Duncan (Shadow Leader of the House/Conservative, Rutland and Melton) – claimed more than £4,000 over a three-year period in expenses for gardening costs until he agreed with the Commons Fees Office that such claims "could be considered excessive" and stopped. Duncan quickly responded by suggesting that the reports in the Telegraph were "misleading", and that all his claims were "legitimate and approved by the fees office".
- Cheryl Gillan (Shadow Welsh Secretary/Conservative, Chesham and Amersham) – claimed on expenses for £4.47 worth of pet food. Gillan confirmed that dog food had been mistakenly included in a claim, and that she would pay the relevant amount back to the Commons.
- Michael Gove (Shadow Children, Schools & Families Secretary/Conservative, Surrey Heath) – claimed £7,000 for furnishing a London property before "flipping" his designated second home to a house in his constituency, a property for which he claimed around £13,000 to cover stamp duty. It is also alleged that Gove claimed for a cot mattress, despite children's items being banned under the Commons rule. Gove said he would repay the claim for the cot mattress, but maintained that his other claims were "below the acceptable threshold costs for furniture".
- Chris Grayling (Shadow Home Secretary/Conservative, Epsom & Ewell) – reportedly claimed to renovate a flat in London, despite already owning three properties inside the M25. Grayling is also said to have continued to claim for works on the property for up to a year after they had finished. Grayling defended his claims, saying he needed to have two homes in order to serve both his constituents and fulfil his duties in the Shadow Cabinet.
- John Gummer (Former Cabinet Minister/Conservative, Suffolk Coastal) – claimed more than £9,000 a year for gardening, for four years. Gummer had to repay the seventh highest amount - about £29,500.
- David Heathcoat-Amory (Conservative, Wells) – allegedly claimed for more than £380 of horse manure for his garden. Heathcoat-Amory responded only to confirm that such claims had indeed been made.
- Douglas Hogg (Conservative, Sleaford and North Hykeham) – allegedly claimed £2,115 to have the moat at his country estate cleaned, as well as claiming for piano tuning and a gardener. Hogg emphatically denied the claims, saying: "I have never claimed for the moat, or for the piano tuning - the allegation that I did is incorrect. I never claimed for these and I never received any money." Later, he responded to the newspaper's claims by saying he had agreed all claims with the fees office, and therefore hoped and believed that they would comply with the rules and the meaning of the rules.
- Stewart Jackson (Shadow Communities Minister/Conservative, Peterborough) – reported to have claimed £11,000 in 'professional fees' and over £300 for maintaining the swimming pool at his home. When questioned, Jackson admitted that the swimming pool claim could be "construed as excessive" and as such would repay the money.
- Bernard Jenkin (Conservative, North Essex) - was reported to have used £50,000 in expenses in order to pay his sister-in-law rent on the property he uses as his constituency home. Jenkin claimed that he was paying "an honest and reasonable rent" for the property.
- Julie Kirkbride (Conservative, Bromsgrove) - was reported to have claimed, amongst other costs, over £1,000 per month in mortgage payments on an apartment in her constituency. She has stated that these claims are "a total distortion". Kirkbride is reported to have claimed, jointly with her husband, MP Andrew Mackay, that the couple's two homes were both second homes, which were subsidised by taxpayers.
- Andrew Lansley (Shadow Health Secretary/Conservative, South Cambridgeshire) – also accused of 'flipping' second homes after claiming in order to renovate a rural cottage prior to selling it. It is claimed that after he 'flipped' his second home designation to a London flat, he claimed thousands of pounds for furniture. Lansley responded to the claims by stating that his claims were "within the rules".
- Oliver Letwin (Chairman of the Conservative Research Department & Policy Review/Conservative, West Dorset) – reportedly claimed over £2,000 to replace a leaking pipe on the tennis courts at his constituency home. Letwin responded by saying that the work had to be carried out because he had been served with a statutory notice by the water company.
- Andrew MacKay (Conservative, Bracknell) - resigned as parliamentary aide to David Cameron over what he described as "unacceptable" expenses claims made by him and his wife, Julie Kirkbride, a fellow MP.
- David Maclean (Conservative, Penrith and The Border) - who introduced the 2007 Bill, spent more than £20,000 improving his farmhouse under the Additional Costs Allowance (ACA) before selling it for £750,000. He claimed the money by designating the property as his "second home" with the Commons authorities, yet Maclean did not pay capital gains tax on the sale because the taxman accepted it was his main home.
- Francis Maude (Shadow Minister for the Cabinet Office/Conservative, Horsham) – allegedly had a claim for mortgage interest rejected by the Fees Office. It is also suggested that Maude purchased a flat in London, close to a house he already owned, before claiming on the flat and renting out the house.
- Malcolm Rifkind (Former Foreign Secretary/Conservative, Kensington and Chelsea) - in 2008 he claimed £3,066 for flights to his home in Scotland despite representing Kensington and Chelsea which is only three tube stops away from the Houses of Parliament.
- Michael Spicer (Chairman of the 1922 Committee/Conservative, West Worcestershire) – said to have claimed for the costs of hanging a chandelier in his main manor house and £5,650 in nine months for his garden to be maintained, which included the cutting of a hedge into a helipad. Spicer responded by saying the helipad was a "family joke".
- Anthony Steen (Conservative, Totnes) - claimed more than £87,000 over four years for maintenance and upkeep of his country home. Since the revelation in the Daily Telegraph, Steen has announced that he will not be standing at the next General Election. He also claimed on the BBC's The World at One radio programme that people were "jealous" because he has a "very, very large house".

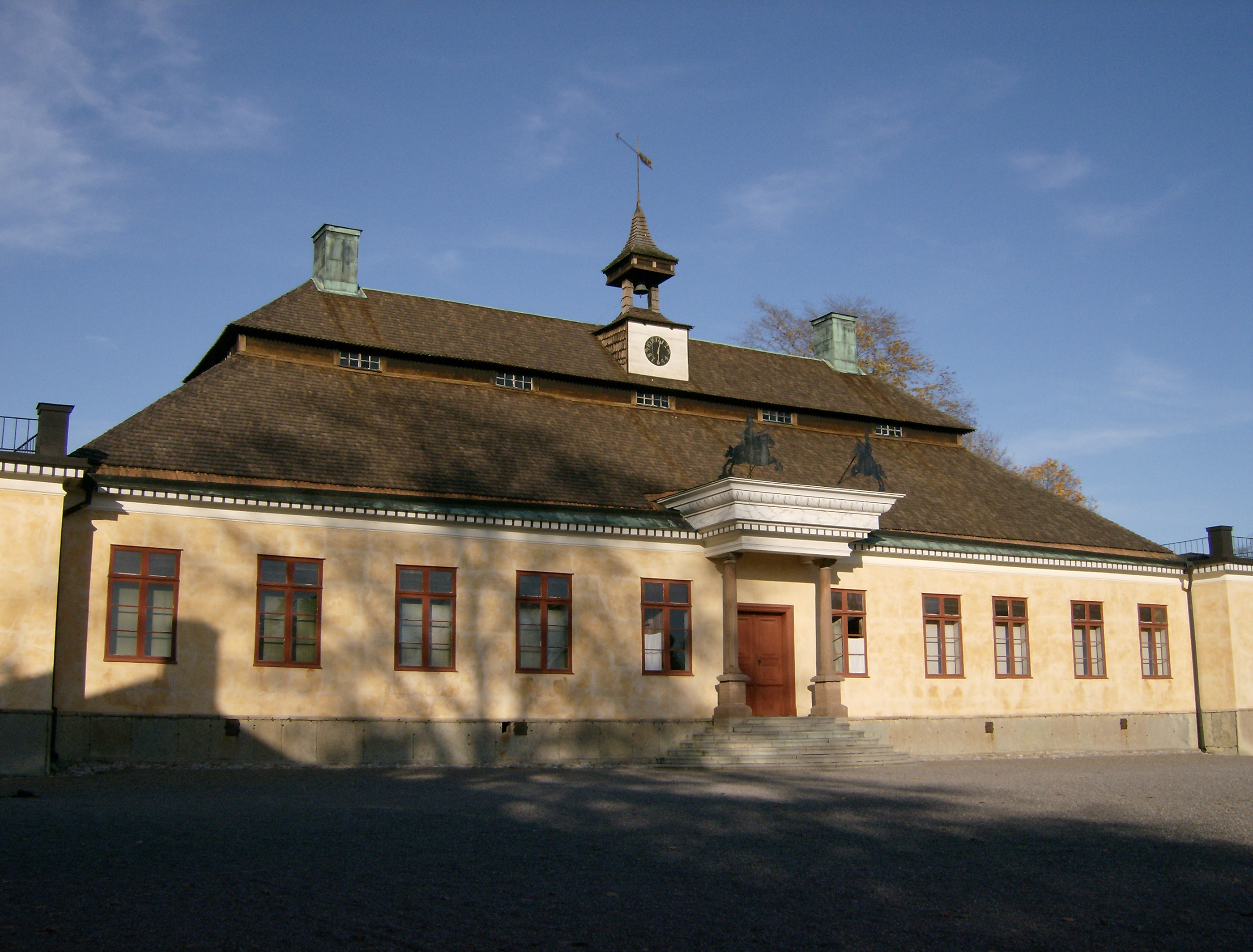
Skogaholm Manor. Peter Viggers claimed compensation for a replica of the manor to be used as a duck house.

- Peter Viggers (Conservative, Gosport) - said to have claimed £20,000 on gardening expenses and £1,645 for a 5 ft duck house, made as a replica of Skogaholm Manor in Stockholm, Sweden. Mystery surrounds the whereabouts of the £1,645 duck house after aerial photographs revealed it was no longer in its pond, but Viggers had sold the property and the new owners may have removed the house for reasons related to this story. The duck house later resurfaced and was auctioned for charity, going on display at a business centre in Wolverhampton
- Bill Wiggin (Conservative, Leominster) - said to have claimed mortgage interest on his constituency home even though the house had never had a mortgage on it.
- David Willetts (Shadow Innovation, Universities and Skills Secretary/Conservative, Havant) – allegedly claimed £100 for workmen to replace 25 light bulbs in his second home. Willetts said that a workman was required to replace the light bulbs because there was a fault in the system that "needed the attention of an electrician".
- Brian Binley (Conservative, Northampton South) - claimed £57,000 over 3 years in rent in respect of a flat owned by a company of which he was chairman. Initially, the arrangement may have been permissible within the expenses rules. In April 2006 the rules were tightened specifically to bar MPs from paying rent to their own companies. The House of Commons fees office contacted Mr Binley to inform him that his arrangement was outside the rules but payments continued until early 2009.

=== Liberal Democrats ===
The Liberal Democrats became the focus of the Daily Telegraph's revelations on day 6 of the publications. The allegations made alongside responses from the MPs are listed below.

- Nick Clegg (Liberal Democrat Leader/Liberal Democrat, Sheffield Hallam) – allegedly claimed the full amount permissible under the Additional Cost Allowance, including claims for food, gardening and redecorating. The Telegraph also said Clegg claimed £80 for international call charges, a claim he said he would repay.
- Chris Huhne (Home Affairs Spokesman/Liberal Democrat Eastleigh) – is said to have claimed for various items including groceries, fluffy dusters and a trouser press. Huhne said he would repay the cost of the trouser press in order "to avoid controversy".
- Menzies Campbell (Former Liberal Democrat leader/Liberal Democrat, North East Fife) – reportedly claimed £10,000 to redesign his flat in London, which included the purchasing of a king-sized bed, scatter cushions and a plasma television. Campbell said he believed that the claims were "within the spirit and letter of the rules" as the flat had not been renovated for 20 years.
- Lembit Öpik (Liberal Democrat, Montgomeryshire) – is said to have claimed £40 to pay a court summons he received for non-payment of Council Tax. Öpik responded by agreeing to repay the amount in question. It was also revealed that Öpik had been refused payment for a £2,500 plasma television for his constituency home because he had purchased it after the dissolution of parliament for the 2005 general election.
- Andrew George (Liberal Democrat, St Ives) – allegedly claims nearly £850 a month for mortgage interest payments on a Docklands flat, the home insurance policy for which is in his daughter's name. George said that whilst his daughter did use the flat as a "bolt-hole", she did not spend more time there than he did.
- Julia Goldsworthy (Liberal Democrat, Falmouth and Camborne) – reportedly claimed thousands of pounds on furniture in the days immediately prior to the end of the financial year, the deadline for expenses claims. Goldsworthy said she had claimed "only reasonable costs for furnishings".

=== Sinn Féin ===
On 10 May 2009, The Sunday Telegraph reported that the five Sinn Féin MPs together claimed nearly £500,000 in second home allowances, despite never taking up their seats at Westminster due to the party's abstentionist policy. In its defence, Sinn Féin stated that its members often have to travel to London on parliamentary business.

- Gerry Adams (Sinn Féin (President), Belfast West) and Martin McGuinness (Sinn Féin, (Note: McGuiness was deputy First Minister of Northern Ireland. Gildernew and Murphy was also ministers in the Northern Ireland Executive) Mid Ulster) – reportedly jointly claimed £3,600 a month for a shared flat in London, for which a local estate agent claims a fair rent would be £1,400.
- Michelle Gildernew (Sinn Féin, Fermanagh & South Tyrone), Pat Doherty (Sinn Féin, West Tyrone) and Conor Murphy (Sinn Féin, Newry & Armagh) – jointly reported to have claimed £5,400 per month as rent for a shared townhouse which an estate agent estimated at costing £1,800 a month.

=== Plaid Cymru ===
- Simon Thomas was found to have over claimed £349.20 in mortgage interest between 2004 and 2005 under the additional costs allowance (ACA). He was recommended to repay this sum, by 1 April 2009 no money was repaid.

=== House of Lords ===
- Glenys Thornton, Baroness Thornton has also been implicated in this controversy, having been reported to be claiming £22,000 a year in expenses by saying that her mother's bungalow in Yorkshire is her main home, amounting to around £130,000 since 2002. She was later cleared of any wrongdoing by Michael Pownall, the Clerk of Parliaments, after it was determined that she spent much of her time there while caring for her mother.
- Amir Bhatia, Baron Bhatia was suspended from the House of Lords for eight months and told to repay £27,446.
- Anthony Clarke, Baron Clarke of Hampstead admitted that he "fiddled" his expenses to make up for not being paid a salary.
- Paul White, Baron Hanningfield was charged with two alleged offences under section 17 of the Theft Act 1968 ("false accounting"). He stepped down from his frontbench role on learning of the charges on 5 February 2010. On 26 May 2011, Lord Hanningfield was found guilty on six counts, and on 1 July 2011, was sentenced to 9 months' imprisonment.
- Swraj Paul, Baron Paul was suspended from the House of Lords for four months and ordered to pay back £41,982.
- John Taylor, Baron Taylor of Warwick pleaded not guilty to six charges of false accounting, but was convicted on 25 January 2011, and on 31 May 2011, was sentenced to 12 months' imprisonment.
- Pola Uddin, Baroness Uddin faced a police investigation for alleged fraud for claiming at least £180,000 in expenses by designating an empty flat, and previously an allegedly non-existent property as her main residence. She was suspended from the House of Lords until the end of 2012 and told to repay £125,349.

=== Couples ===
- Peter and Iris Robinson (DUP, Belfast East and Strangford) were found to have been claiming nearly the maximum amount for food, totalling £30,000 over four years. Both Robinsons were also members of the Northern Ireland Assembly, with Peter Robinson serving as First Minister, and both had voted in fewer than 40% of divisions in the period. Peter said, "I think if MPs slept on a park bench and starved themselves that would still be too much for some people."
- Alan and Ann Keen (Labour, Feltham & Heston/Labour, Brentford & Isleworth and junior Health minister) allegedly claimed mortgage interest for a £500,000 flat designated as their second home, despite their constituencies being 30 minutes away from Parliament. Alan Keen responded to the allegations by stating that the fees office had agreed the claims. £20,000 from the £520,000 mortgage was spent on "fixtures and fittings" on the property. The Parliamentary Standards Commissioner investigated the Keens' claims.

On 26 June 2009 a group of squatters moved into the Keens' main home in protest over the Keens' expense claims, amid claims that their main home was derelict and they had not lived in it for a year. The fees office agreed the claims as they were unable to live in the property due to a building dispute.
