= Michael Davies (parliamentary official) =

Sir John Michael Davies KCB (born 2 August 1940) is the former Clerk of the Parliaments of the United Kingdom. He succeeded Sir Michael Wheeler-Booth on 4 January 1997 and retired on 14 July 2003 succeeded by Paul Hayter. Sir Michael had overseen significant changes to the workings and Membership of the House of Lords related to the changes brought about by the passage of the House of Lords Act.

== Career ==
Sir Michael began his career at Westminster in 1964 and served in various roles before becoming Clerk of the Parliaments in 1997. He served as the Private Secretary to the Government Chief Whip and Leader of the House when Lord Windlesham held the position. He was also editor of the Journal of the Society of Commonwealth Clerks (called The Table), and was secretary of the Statute Law Committee, as well as Chair of the Association of Secretaries General of Parliaments.

== House of Lords ==
Sir Michael was Clerk of the Parliaments at the time of the passage of the House of Lords Act, 1999 which required several administrative changes. In his address to the Chamber, on the retirement of Sir Michael, Lord Williams of Mostyn said that "[h]e oversaw the first change in administration in 18 years. He piloted the House through the passage of the House of Lords Bill and its subsequent implementation. He played an important part in devising a way of electing the elected hereditary Peers, including his wise suggestion that the Electoral Reform Society should be engaged." He was also the first Clerk to have relied on email and had a laptop at the table.

== Family ==
Sir Michael is descended from a distinguished line of ancestors. His grandfather was a cleric in the Church of Wales and was one of the great antiquarians of Welsh history. His father was a distinguished member of the Indian Civil Service. His mother was a niece of William Temple, Archbishop of Canterbury. Sir Michael's great-grandfather, Frederick Temple, was the Archbishop of Canterbury at the turn of the century who, at the age of 81 in 1902, had the task of making the arrangements for the coronation of Edward VII the son of Queen Victoria.
