= Lord Henderson =

Lord Henderson may refer to:

- William Henderson, 1st Baron Henderson (1891–1984), British Labour politician
- Joseph Henderson, 1st Baron Henderson of Ardwick (1884–1950), British Labour politician
- Peter Henderson, Baron Henderson of Brompton (1922–2000), British public servant
