= Baldwin Hyde =

Baldwin Hyde (died 16 August 1472) was a Canon of Windsor from 1469 to 1472 and Clerk of the Parliaments 1470 - 1471.

== Career ==
He was appointed:

- Prebendary of Hollington in St Mary-in-the-Castle, Hastings
- Clerk in Chancery
- Clerk of the Parliaments 1470 - 1471

He was appointed to the eighth stall in St George's Chapel, Windsor Castle in 1469 and held the canonry until 1472.

== Notes ==
Political offices
Preceded by John Fawkes	Clerk of the Parliaments; 1470 - 1741	Succeeded by John Gunthorpe
