= East Ham Grammar School =

East Ham Grammar School may refer to:

- Langdon School, Newham, formerly East Ham Grammar School for Boys
- Plashet School, formerly East Ham Grammar School for Girls
