= Manzila Uddin, Baroness Uddin =

British non-affiliated life peer and community activist (born 1959)

The Right Honourable The Baroness Uddin
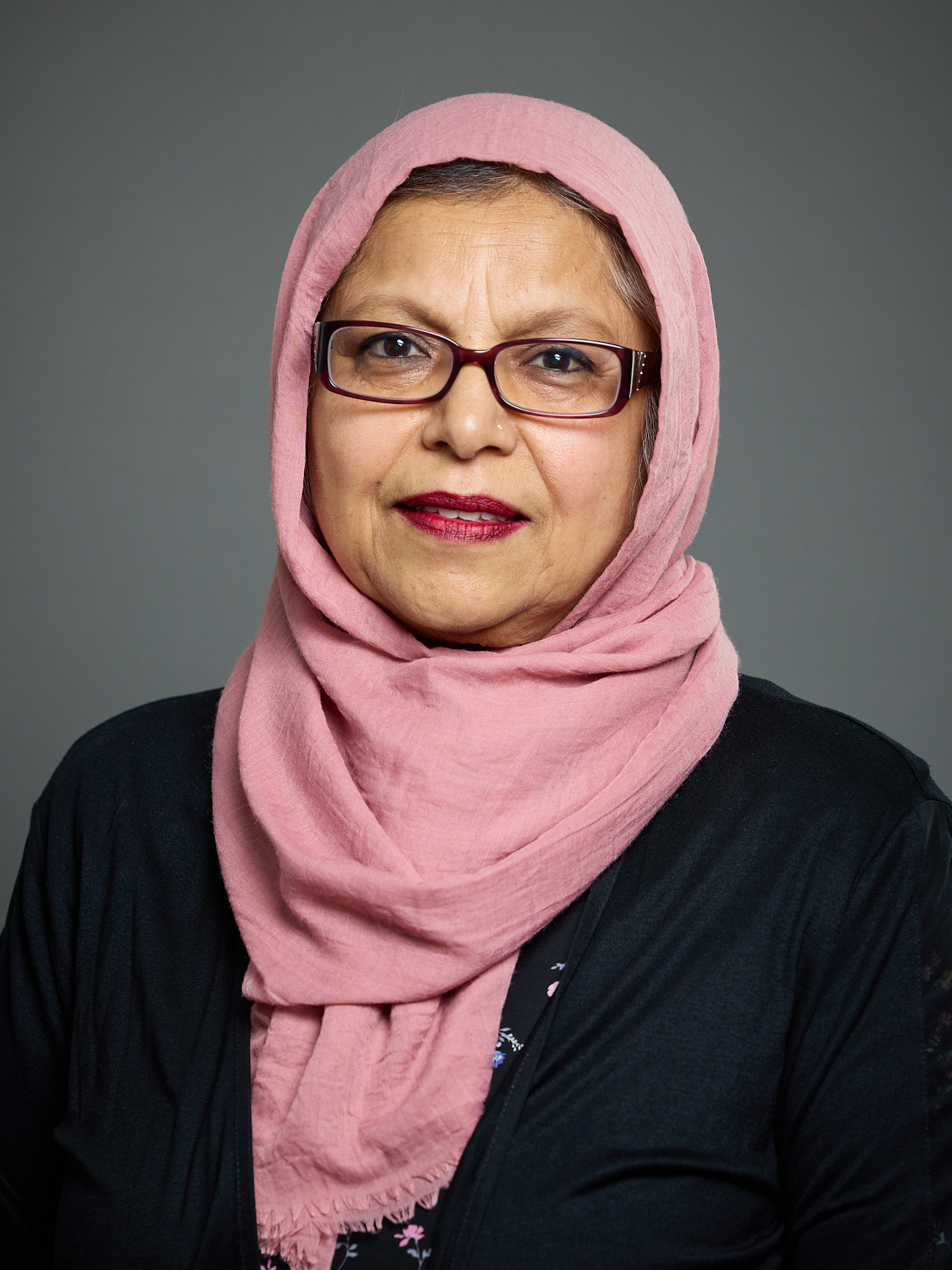
- Official portrait, 2025

Member of the House of Lords
- Lord Temporal
- Life peerage 18 July 1998

Personal details
- Born: Manzila Pola Khan; 17 July 1959 (age 67) Rajshahi, East Pakistan (now Bangladesh)
- Party: Non-afflliated
- Spouse: Komar Uddin
- Children: 5
- Parent: Matin Khan (Father)
- Education: University of North London
- Occupation: Community activist
- Profession: Politician
- Website: www.baronessuddin.com

Manzila Pola Uddin, Baroness Uddin (née Khan; born 17 July 1959) is a British life peer-member of the House of Lords and community activist. In 2009 she was included on The Guardian's Muslim Women Power List for Britain.

She previously sat for Labour when, in 2012, Uddin was required to repay £125,349, the largest amount in the United Kingdom parliamentary expenses scandal.

== Early life ==
Manzila Pola Khan was born on 17 July 1959 to a Bengali Muslim Khan family from Rajshahi, East Pakistan (now Bangladesh). She moved with her parents to the United Kingdom in 1973, when she was 13 years of age, and she grew up in East London. She attended the Plashet School in East Ham and was educated at the University of North London, where she earned a degree in social work.

== Political career ==
Uddin started her professional career by creating and leading community working groups in the late 1970s. In 1980, she started working as a Youth and Community worker with the YWCA, and then a Liaison Officer for Tower Hamlets Social Services, and Manager of Tower Hamlets Women's Health Project. She then began working for Newham social services in 1988. In 1990, Uddin was elected a Labour councillor in the London Borough of Tower Hamlets, the first Bengali woman to hold such an office of a local authority in the United Kingdom. She was the Deputy Leader of Tower Hamlets council from 1994 to 1996.

In 1997, she applied to be the Labour parliamentary candidate for the Bethnal Green and Bow constituency but did not reach the shortlist. Appointed a Labour "working peer" by Tony Blair, she was raised to the peerage, at the age of 39, as Baroness Uddin, of Bethnal Green in the London Borough of Tower Hamlets, for life by Letters patent in the afternoon of 18 July 1998, at the House of Lords. She was the youngest woman on the benches and the only Muslim and Asian woman to be appointed to the House of Lords. She was invited to the House of Lords for her contribution to the advancement of women and disability rights, swearing in by saying "Almighty Allah" as she took her seat in the parliament. Since entering the House of Lords she has supported a handful of initiatives.

Uddin has been long campaigning for the increase of skills of Asian women living in Britain. She helped found the first purpose-built education and training centre for Asian women in the UK called the Jagonari Centre, located at Whitechapel, East London, in 1987. Uddin is a member of the EOP Implementation Committee, and a trustee of St Katherine's and Shadwell Trust.

In 2005, she was selected by Blair to be part of a delegation to tackle Islamic extremism. However, in August 2006, Uddin was a signatory to an open letter to Blair criticising the UK's foreign policy. It was an open letter criticising the government's stance on the Middle East. It was signed by three Muslim MPs (which included Sadiq Khan and Mohammed Sarwar), three peers and 38 community groups. The letter was criticised by the then Foreign Office minister, Kim Howells who criticised Muslim leaders for condemning British foreign policy. In 2008, she was made the chairwoman of the ethnic minority women's taskforce.

In 2009, Uddin was nominated for the shortlist of female Peer of the Year at the Women in Public Life Awards though was ultimately unsuccessful.

In 2010, the National Executive Committee of the Labour Party suspended Uddin indefinitely from the party in light of the expenses claim allegations. In 2019, a Labour Party spokesperson stated that Uddin was a member of the Labour Party.

In October 2010, under the recommendation of The Privileges and Conduct Committee of The House of Lords a suspension is to be handed down to Pola Uddin until Easter 2012 at the earliest for claiming expenses "to which she was not entitled". The committee also acknowledged a repayment agreement for expenses wrongly claimed.

In December 2019, Uddin campaigned for the successful Labour Party candidate for Poplar and Limehouse, Apsana Begum, during the 2019 General Election.

Uddin is Treasurer of the All Party Parliamentary Group (APPG) for International Students, and Chair of the APPG on the Metaverse and Web 3.0.

=== Expenses scandal ===
In May 2009, an article by The Sunday Times Insight team alleged that Uddin submitted House of Lords Expenses for a flat in Maidstone, Kent as her main residence. The article alleged Uddin claimed £30,000 per annum of tax-free expenses since purchasing the flat in 2005, and since 2001 on an unnamed residence outside London. The flat purchase was said to be connected with her to claim for second home allowance on her existing London property, a scheme that ostensibly exists to compensate politicians living outside London for the cost of accommodation close to Parliament. Residents living near the flat in Maidstone reportedly said they had not seen any occupiers in the flat since Uddin purchased it and that it had remained completely unfurnished until 2009, but Uddin claims: "The Maidstone property is furnished and I strongly deny that I have never lived there". Uddin's husband even denied having a property in Kent when questioned on the issue by the Times, and she appeared on the electoral roll at her London address from 1996 to date. Additionally, her Facebook page states how she has lived in the East End of London for over 30 years.

Uddin claimed a total of £29,675 for accommodation in 2007–08, a time when the maximum daily accommodation claim was £165 a day. This represents a claim at the maximum possible rate for 179 days, more days than the Lords actually sat that year.

Scottish National Party MP Angus Robertson called for an investigation on the report to the House of Lords authorities and the police. Uddin said, "I do not believe that I have done anything wrong or breached any House of Lords rules." She stated "I strongly deny that I have never lived there. Indeed I have stayed there regularly since buying it".

Uddin claimed her main home had been outside London since 2001, earning an extra £83,000 as a result. Despite repeated questioning she has refused to state the location and details of her main home between 2001 and 2005 for which expenses were also claimed. In January 2010 The Times newspaper revealed the property she had claimed for during this period was owned and occupied by her brother and his family, with Uddin's sister-in-law stating she couldn't recollect the Peer ever living there. She also has one of the highest claims for overnight subsistence of any member of the Lords.

Uddin's home in Wapping, where she lives and is registered to vote, is a housing association property. Spitalfields Housing Association received a public subsidy of £37.8 million in 2008. The average rent for its properties is £104 a week, a sixth of the market rate. The allegations of fraud led the Conservative opposition leader in Tower Hamlets, Peter Golds, to state, "Lady Uddin is depriving a low-income family of a home which was built for the needy at public expense".

On 5 May 2009, one of the senior Lord's officials, Clerk of the Parliaments, announced that the House of Lords authorities would investigate the report by the Sunday Times. Uddin welcomed the investigation: "I welcome this review and will co-operate fully with him in the hope of a speedy resolution and clarity that I did not break the rules of the House."

On 23 November 2009, Uddin's cases were passed to the police for possible prosecution for fraud. The Daily Telegraph later reported that she was refusing to co-operate with the police investigation, refusing to answer any questions.

The Crown Prosecution Service announced on 10 March 2010 that Baroness Uddin would not face any charges on the grounds that a senior parliamentary official ruled that a peer's "main house" might be a place they visit only once a month. There were no indications that the expenses would be paid back.

On 18 October 2010, the House of Lords Privileges and Conduct Committee ruled that Baroness Uddin had 'acted in bad faith' and recommended that she should be asked to repay £125,349 as well as being suspended from Parliament until Easter 2012. Lord Alli lent Uddin £62,000 to help her repay the expenses.

On 21 October 2010 the House of Lords voted to accept the committee's recommendations. However, in November 2011, it was revealed that no formal mechanism existed to prevent Baroness Uddin's return to the House of Lords, even if she refused to repay the expenses that were fraudulently claimed, leading many members of her own party to call for her to resign rather than bring the House of Lords into further disrepute.

In December 2011 the House Committee in the Lords recommended that Uddin and Lord Hanningfield should not be allowed back to the Lords until the outstanding expenses had been repaid. The money was repaid in 2012 with the help of £124,000 of loans from friends, and she returned to membership of the House of Lords in May 2012.

The amount of money Uddin was required to repay, £125,349, was the largest amount of the United Kingdom parliamentary expenses scandal.

=== Bangladesh mansion ===
Further expenses claims by Uddin were later discovered when The Sunday Times revealed that she owns a mansion in Bangladesh. The mansion was described as made out of Italian marble with tiles, mosaics and with a balcony. The mansion was believed to have been built after Uddin became a peer in 1998, costing £140,000 which was organised by her husband Komar, located in Jawa Bazar in Chhatak; this is where many of her in-laws are originally from. However, Uddin claims that the land was bought by her husband's family, purchased by Komar's father in 1980.

== Nomination ==
In January 2013, Uddin was nominated for the Muslim Woman of the Year award at the British Muslim Awards but did not win.

== Personal life ==
Uddin is married to Komar Uddin; his family is originally from Chhatak, Sunamganj District. Together they have four sons and one daughter.

== See also ==
- British Bangladeshi
- List of British Bangladeshis
- List of ethnic minority politicians in the United Kingdom
