= Henry Badeley, 1st Baron Badeley =

British civil servant and engraver

Portrait by Walter Stoneman, 1937

Henry John "Jack" Fanshawe Badeley, 1st Baron Badeley, KCB, CBE (27 June 1874 – 27 September 1951), known as Sir Henry Badeley between 1935 and 1949, was a British civil servant and engraver. He was Clerk of the Parliaments from 1934 to 1949.

== Early life and education ==
Badeley was born at Elswick, near Newcastle-upon-Tyne, the son of Capt. Henry Badeley, originally of Guy Harlings, Chelmsford, Essex, and Blanche Alicia Allhusen (1847–1929). He had a younger sister, Althea Beatrice (1875–1944), who married Admiral Stuart Nicholson. His grandfathers were Dr. John Carr Badeley FRCP (1794–1851) and the Danish-German chemical manufacturer Christian Allhusen (1806–1890).

He was educated at Radley College and Trinity College, Oxford.

== Career ==
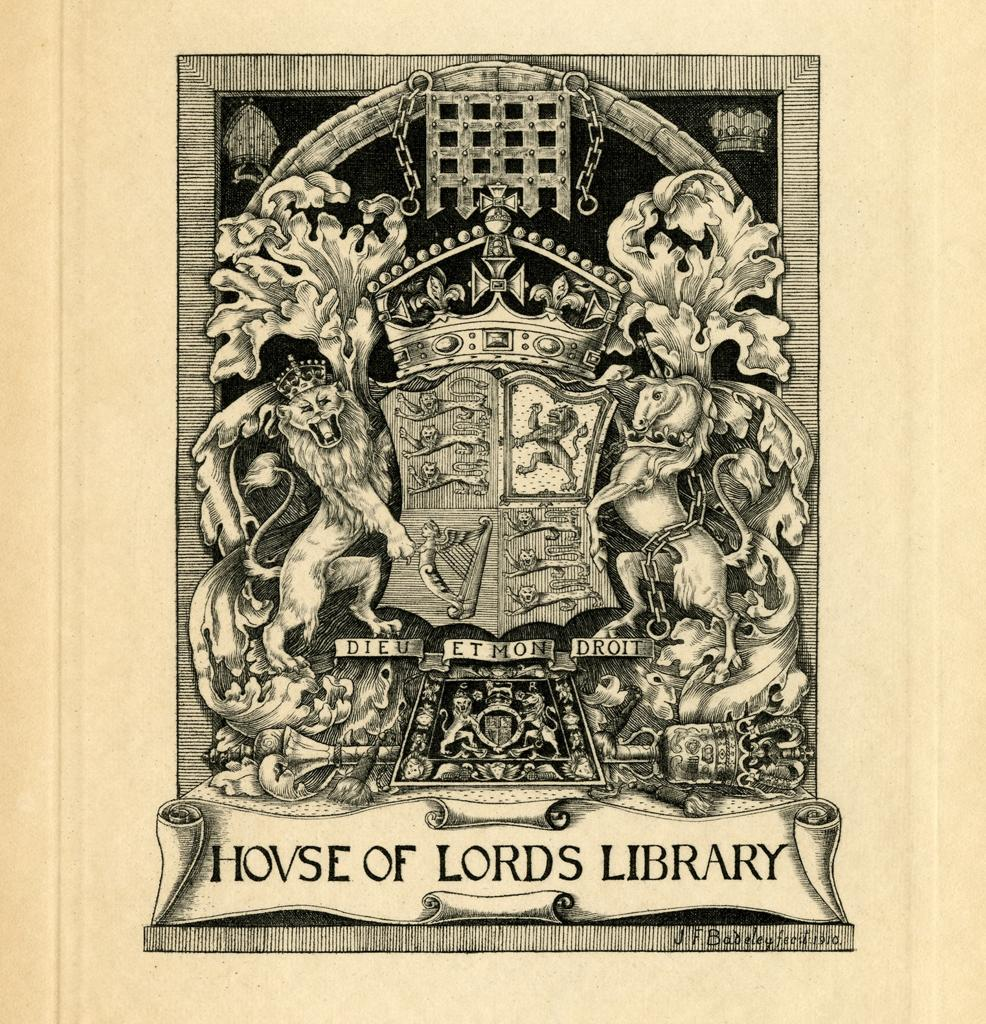
Bookplate for the House of Lords Library designed by Badeley and dated 1910

Badeley entered the Parliament Office in 1897 and was Principal Clerk and Taxing Officer at the Judicial Department of the House of Lords from 1919 to 1930. He was appointed a Commander of the Order of the British Empire (CBE) in 1920 and became Assistant Clerk of the Parliaments in 1930. In 1934, he was promoted to Clerk of the Parliaments, an office he held until 1949.

He was made a Knight Commander of the Order of the Bath (KCB) in 1935 and elevated to the peerage as Baron Badeley, of Badley in the County of Suffolk, in 1949. After his retirement the Marquess of Salisbury said of him: "He could almost be described as the father of the house, for he had been the guide, philosopher and friend to whom they had gone in their troubles". He was a regular contributor in the House of Lords during his two years as a member.

Apart from his career in the civil service Badeley was a noted engraver. He studied under Sir Frank Short at the Royal College of Art and had his works exhibited at the Royal Academy. He was a Fellow of the Royal Society of Painter-Etchers and Engravers and was Honorary Secretary to the society from 1911 to 1921.

As an engraver, Badeley designed bookplates for many customers, including members of the peerage. He designed a bookplate for the House of Lords Library in 1910, almost 40 years before his own elevation to the peerage. Many of his bookplates and other engravings survive in library and museum collections.

== Death ==
Lord Badeley was a devoted Roman Catholic. He died unmarried in 1951 in London, aged 77, when the barony became extinct.

== Arms ==
Coat of arms of Henry Badeley, 1st Baron Badeley

Crest
A Boar's Head couped at the neck Argent charged with a trefoil slipped Gules
Escutcheon
Gules a Chevron between three Boars' Heads couped at the neck Argent each charged with a Trefoil slipped of the field
Supporters
On either side an Eagle wings elevated Sable charged with a Portcullis chained Or
Motto
Principiis obsta

Government offices
Preceded by Edward Alderson	Clerk of the Parliaments; 1934–1949	Succeeded by Robert Overbury
Peerage of the United Kingdom
New creation	Baron Badeley; 1949–1951	Extinct
