= Elsynge =

Elsynge may refer to:

- Henry Elsynge
- Elsynge Palace
