= Allhusen =

Allhusen is a surname. Notable people with this surname include:

- Augustus Henry Eden Allhusen (1867–1925), English Conservative Party politician
- Christian Allhusen (1806–1890), Danish-English chemical manufacturer
- Derek Allhusen (1914–2000), English equestrian
