= Paul Hayter =

British public servant and clerk of the Parliament

Sir Paul Hayter KCB LVO
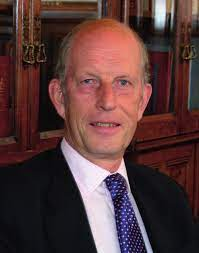

Clerk of the Parliaments
- In office 14 July 2003 – 3 November 2007
- Monarch: Elizabeth II
- Preceded by: Michael Davies
- Succeeded by: Michael Pownall

Personal details
- Born: Paul David Grenville Hayter; 4 November 1942 (age 83)
- Spouse: Deborah Maude (m. 1973)
- Children: 3
- Relatives: Angus Maude (father-in-law)
- Education: Eton College; Christ Church, Oxford

Sir Paul David Grenville Hayter KCB LVO (born 4 November 1942) is a British public servant and was Clerk of the Parliaments from 2003 to 2007.

== Early life and education ==
Hayter is the eldest son of Michael Hayter and his wife Patricia Schofield and has four siblings. He is the great-great-grandson of Harrison Hayter.

He was educated at Eton College (where he was a King's Scholar) and Christ Church, Oxford.

== Career ==
He became a Clerk in the House of Lords in 1964. From 1974 to 1977 he was seconded to the Cabinet Office as Private Secretary to the Leader of the House of Lords and the Government Chief Whip, serving two Leaders, Lord Shepherd (1974-1976) and Lord Peart (from 1976), and one Chief Whip, Baroness Llewelyn-Davies of Hastoe. From 1977 to 1991, in addition to his work in the House of Lords, he served as Secretary of the Association of Lord-Lieutenants, and in 1992 he was created a Lieutenant of the Royal Victorian Order. He was Reading Clerk from 1991 to 1997, and Clerk Assistant from 1997 to 2003.

In July 2003 he was appointed Clerk of the Parliaments.

He was appointed a Knight Commander of the Order of the Bath in the Queen's Birthday Honours in June 2007. On 20 March 2007, Hayter announced that he would retire as Clerk of the Parliaments on 3 November 2007. He was succeeded by Michael Pownall on 4 November 2007 (a day after Hayter's retirement).

In 1973 he married Deborah Maude, daughter of Angus Maude, and has three children, William, Giles and Arabella.
