= Edward Ollard =

Clerk of the Parliaments

Sir Edward Christopher Ollard KCB is a British public servant and former Clerk of the Parliaments.

Ollard was appointed as Clerk of the Parliaments with the effect from 16 April 2017 for a term of three years. In April 2020, he was re-appointed for another three-year term. In September 2020, he announced though that he will retire from the office at Easter 2021. He was appointed Knight Commander of the Order of the Bath (KCB) in the 2021 Birthday Honours for services to Parliament.

He served earlier as Clerk Assistant of the House of Lords.

Government offices
Preceded by Sir David Beamish	Clerk of the Parliaments; 2017–2021	Succeeded by Simon Burton
