= Launcelot Henderson =

The Right Honourable Sir Launcelot Henderson
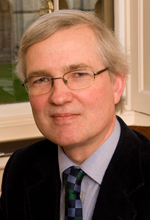

Lord Justice of Appeal
- In office 3 November 2016 – 20 November 2021
- Monarch: Elizabeth II

Personal details
- Born: 20 November 1951 (age 74)
- Education: Balliol College, Oxford

Sir Launcelot Dinadan James Henderson (born 20 November 1951), styled The Rt Hon. Lord Justice Henderson or Sir Launcelot Henderson, is a retired Lord Justice of Appeal.

== Early life ==
The son of Peter Henderson, Lord Henderson of Brompton, he was educated at Westminster School and Balliol College, Oxford.

== Career ==
He was called to the bar at Lincoln's Inn in 1977 and became a bencher there in 2004. He held appointment as Junior Counsel to the Inland Revenue. He was made a QC in 1995, deputy judge of the High Court from 2001 to 2007, and judge of the High Court of Justice (Chancery Division) from 2007 to 2016. On 13 September 2016, it was announced that he would join the Court of Appeal as a Lord Justice of Appeal from Autumn 2016. He took office on 3 November 2016 and his appointment to the Privy Council was announced 15 days later.

He is a Distinguished Fellow of All Souls College, Oxford.
