= Thomas Knyvett (parliamentary official) =

Parliamentary officer of England (d. 1637)

Thomas Knyvett (died 1637) was an English parliamentary officer who served as Clerk of the Parliaments from 1635 to 1637.

Little is known about the life of Thomas Knyvett. He was the half-brother of Henry Elsynge, whose mother Frances had married Henry Knyvett (d. 1601) in 1584. He likely trained under Elsynge, who was named Clerk of the Parliaments (that is, senior clerk to the House of Lords) in 1621. That year Knyvett was paid by the House to research earlier records of impeachment.

Knyvett was granted a reversion of the office of Clerk of the Parliaments 8 October 1611 and surrendered it 14 May 1613. He was regranted the reversion on 1 September 1613 and succeeded Elsynge on 29 September 1635. Knyvett died sometime before 21 December 1637, when his successor was sworn in.
