= Chloe Mawson =

British parliamentary official

Chloe Mawson OBE

Clerk of the Parliaments
- Incumbent
- Assumed office 2 April 2026

Clerk Assistant of the House of Lords
- In office 2021 – 1 April 2026

Chloe Kate Sevgi Kilcoyne Mawson OBE is a British public servant and the current Clerk of the Parliaments.

== Career ==
Mawson came to work in the House of Lords in 1999. She was appointed Clerk Assistant in 2021. She was the first woman to be appointed to this office. She was the first House of Lords Clerk to request and manage flexible work around caring for her three children, including part time work, compressed hours and a job share in her previous role.

In November 2025 Mawson was announced as the next Clerk of the Parliaments, taking up the position on 2 April 2026. Succeeding Simon Burton, she became the 66th holder of the office of Clerk of the Parliaments and the first woman to be appointed.

Mawson was appointed an Officer of the Order of the British Empire "for services to Parliament and to the State Funeral of Her Majesty Queen Elizabeth II" in the 2023 Birthday Honours.

Mawson was appointed a governor of the West London Free School in 2022.
