= Simon Burton (parliamentary official) =

British parliamentary official

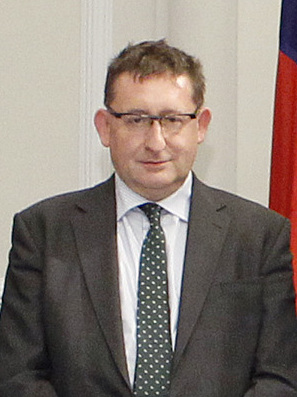
Burton in 2014

Sir Simon Peter Burton KCB is a British public servant who served as Clerk of the Parliaments, the chief clerk in the House of Lords, from 2 April 2021 to 1 April 2026.

Burton was born in 1964. He initially applied to the Civil Service Fast Stream upon leaving university, but changed his plans after he was sent information about a Fast Stream job at the House of Lords. He started working there in January 1988 as a clerk in the Committee Office before becoming first clerk of the Constitution Committee. From 1996 to 1999, Burton was the Private Secretary to the Leader of the House and the Government Chief Whip.

Burton was appointed as Clerk of the Parliaments with the effect from 2 April 2021 for a term of five years. He served earlier as Clerk Assistant and, before that, as Reading Clerk in the House of Lords.

On 24 July 2025 it was announced that Burton would retire as Clerk of the Parliaments on 1 April 2026. On 10 November 2025 it was announced that his successor would be Chloe Mawson. A debate in tribute to Burton's service was held on 13 April 2026. Baroness Smith, the Leader of the House, and Lord True, the Shadow Leader, thanked Burton for his service.

Burton was appointed Knight Commander of the Order of the Bath (KCB) in the 2026 Birthday Honours for services to Parliament.

Burton's daughter was featured on Junior Bake Off.

Government offices
Preceded by Edward Ollard	Clerk of the Parliaments; 2021–2026	Succeeded by Chloe Mawson
