= Victor Goodman =

British public servant (1899–1967)

Portrait by Walter Bird, 1960

Sir Victor Martin Reeves Goodman KCB OBE MC (14 February 1899 – 29 September 1967) was a British public servant and Clerk of the Parliaments from 1959 to 1963.

He was educated at Eton College. He served in the First World War with the Coldstream Guards, and was awarded the Military Cross in 1919.

In 1920 he became a Clerk in the House of Lords. He became Judicial Taxing Officer in 1934, Principal Clerk of the Judicial Office in 1946, Reading Clerk in 1949, and Clerk Assistant in 1953. He was appointed Clerk of the Parliaments in 1959 and retired in 1963.

From 1941 to 1945 he was Chief ARP and Security Officer of the Palace of Westminster.

From 1949 to 1963 he was a trustee of the British Museum. From 1963 until his death he was a trustee of the Natural History Museum.

He was appointed OBE in 1946, CB in 1951, and KCB in 1959.

== Personal life ==
In 1928 he married Julian Morrell, daughter of Lady Ottoline Morrell; they had two sons and a daughter. The marriage was dissolved in 1946, and in 1948 he married Anstice Crawley. She died in 2001.
