= Henry Elsynge (parliamentary official) =

British parliamentary officer

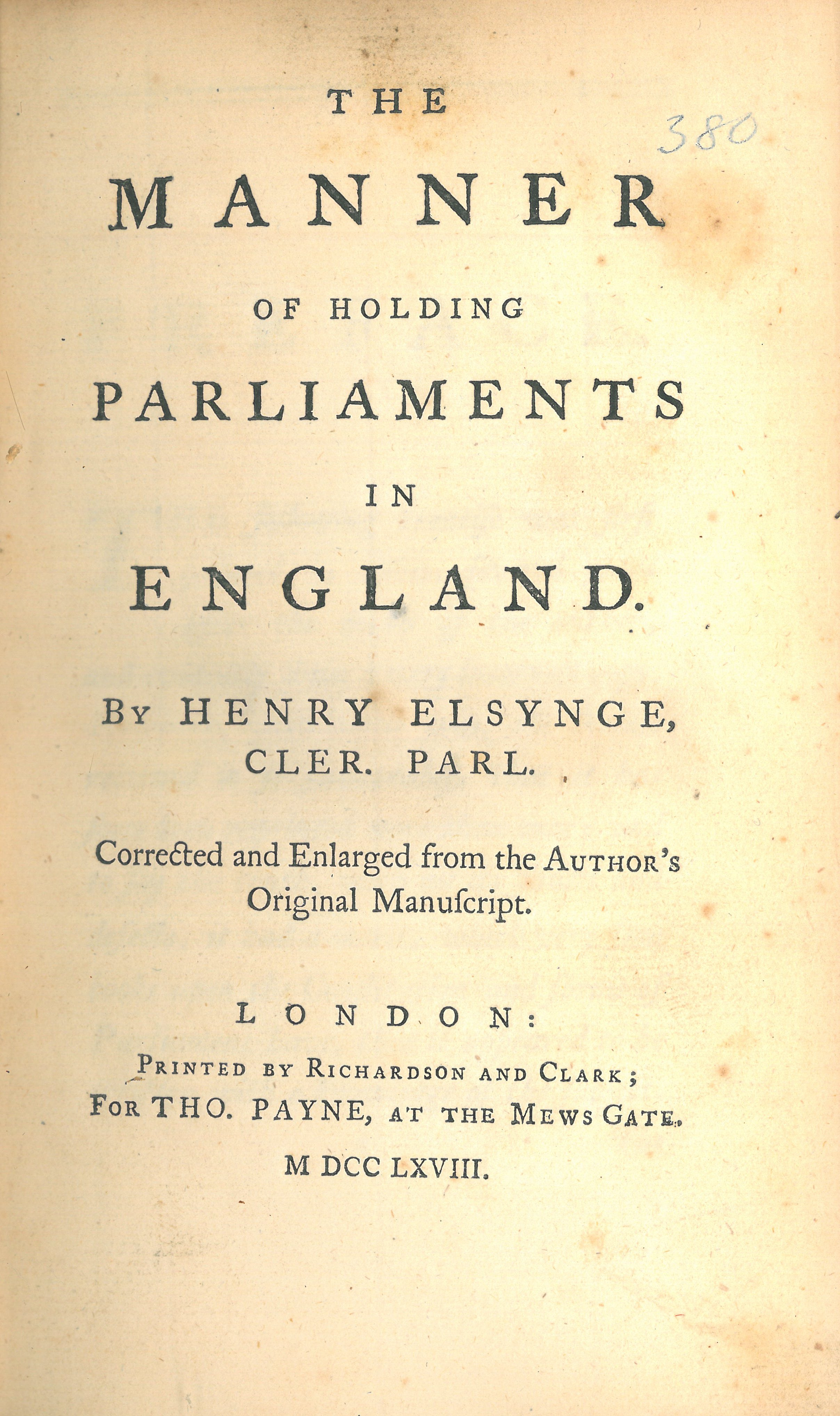
The title page of the 1768 edition of Elsynge's The Manner of Holding Parliaments in England, edited by Thomas Tyrwhitt

Henry Elsynge (less often Elsyng or Elsing) (bap. 1577–1635) was an English parliamentary officer in the reigns of James I and Charles I. He served as Keeper of the Records in the Tower of London jointly with Robert Bowyer from 1604 to 1612, and was named to the office of Clerk of the Parliaments in 1621.

He is known for his treatise The Manner of Holding Parliaments in England, or, Modus tenendi parliamentum apud Anglos, which he completed in 1625, but which was published in 1660.

He is sometimes referred to as Henry Elsynge the elder to distinguish him from his son, also called Henry Elsynge (1606–1656).

== Life and family ==
Henry Elsynge was probably born in 1577. He was baptised 21 August of that year at St Dunstan-in-the-West, London. He was the eldest son of Henry Elsynge (d. 1582) and his wife Frances, daughter of Edmund Browne. Both Elsynge's father and Edmund Browne were Merchant Taylors in the parish of St Dunstan-in-the-West. In 1584, Elsynge's widowed mother Frances married Henry Knyvett, the older half-brother of Robert Bowyer who would be Elsynge's mentor and partner throughout his career.

Elsynge attended St Albans School and Gonville and Caius College, Cambridge, where he was recorded as pensioner as of 14 October 1597. He left Cambridge without a degree and entered the Middle Temple on 19 February 1597 to study the law. He was called to the bar on 19 April 1605.

On 12 July 1600, Elsynge married Blanche, daughter of Richard Highgate or Hyett and niece of Robert Bowyer. They had two sons, of whom the elder Henry Elsynge (1606–1656) would serve as Clerk of the House of Commons from 1639 to 1649. Blanche died in 1612, and Elsynge married as his second wife Jane, daughter of Richard Hardy of Dorset. They had four sons and one daughter.

== Career ==
In 1604, Robert Bowyer and Henry Elsynge were appointed jointly to the position of Keeper of the Records in the Tower of London, which had been held by Bowyer's father William from 1563 until his death in 1569 or 1570. Elsynge took up residence on Tower Hill and spent his working days researching parliamentary precedents in the historical Tower records with their "crabbed medieval hand, the abbreviated Latin and law French which faded as men wound and rewound the clumsy parchment."

Robert Bowyer was sworn Clerk of the Parliaments, that is, senior clerk of the House of Lords, on 30 January 1610. Elsynge soon joined Bowyer as his assistant. They continued to serve as joint Keepers of the Records in the Tower until 1612. Elsynge's future was secured when he was formally granted the reversion of the clerkship on 1 September 1613. Around 1615 he relocated to Westminster.

Elsynge was sworn into the position of Clerk of the Parliaments on 21 March 1621, following Bowyer's death on 15 March. "As clerk he served on the floor of the House of Lords, wrote the record of the king's highest court, and established in the ancient Jewel Tower of the palace yet another repository for the king's records, the archive of parliament." He formally held the clerkship until a few months before his death, although he no longer served in the House of Lords after Charles I's dissolution of Parliament in March 1629. From this time forward he resided primarily in Oxfordshire at his manor of Cornwell or Cornewall, near Chipping Norton.

== Death ==
Elsynge's will was dated 13 October 1635 and it is likely he died in November. He was succeeded as Clerk of the Parliaments by his half-brother Thomas Knyvett, who took office on 29 September 1635 and had died by 21 December 1637.

== Works ==
Elsynge is best known today as a scholar and historian of Parliament. His studies of original documents as Keeper of the Records and his role in maintaining the records of the House of Lords in the tumultuous years leading up to the dissolution of Parliament inform his treatise, The Manner of Holding Parliaments in England, or, Modus tenendi parliamentum apud Anglos, which remained unfinished at his death. Book 1 of this work was published in 1660, and various chapters based on Elsynge's manuscripts have been published individually.

Bowyer and Elsynge's official notes as Clerks of the Parliaments were published as Notes of the Debates in the House of Lords Officially Taken by Robert Bowyer and Henry Elsing 1621, 1625, 1628, edited by Frances Helen Relf, Royal Historical Society, London, 1929.
