= David Beamish =

British public servant

Sir David Beamish KCB
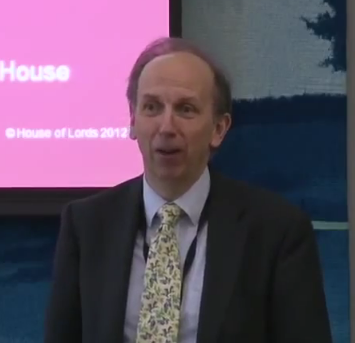

Clerk of the Parliaments
- In office 16 April 2011 – 15 April 2017
- Monarch: Elizabeth II
- Preceded by: Michael Pownall
- Succeeded by: Edward Ollard

Personal details
- Born: David Richard Beamish; 20 August 1952 (age 74) Carlisle, Cumbria, England
- Citizenship: United Kingdom
- Education: St John's College, Cambridge

Sir David Richard Beamish, KCB (born 20 August 1952) is a British public servant who was the Clerk of the Parliaments, the chief clerk in the House of Lords, between 16 April 2011 and 15 April 2017.

== Personal life ==
Beamish was born on 20 August 1952 in Carlisle, Cumbria, England. He was educated at Marlborough College and St John's College, Cambridge.

In 1988, he was the winner of the BBC TV series Mastermind, with Nancy Astor as his special subject.

== Career ==
Beamish became a clerk with the House of Lords in 1974 and was promoted to Senior Clerk in 1979. He was seconded to the Cabinet Office to serve as Private Secretary (jointly) to the Leader of the House of Lords and Government Chief Whip in the Lords (1983–86). In 1987, he was appointed Chief Clerk, serving until being appointed Principal Clerk in 1993. He served as Clerk of the Journals from 1993 to 1995. He then served as Clerk of Committees and Clerk of the Overseas Office from 1995 to 2002, until returning to the Journals role, in which he served until 2005. He served as Reading Clerk from 2005 to 2007, when he was appointed Clerk Assistant (the second-ranking clerk in the Lords). He was promoted to Clerk of the Parliaments on 16 April 2011.

On 1 December 2016, Beamish announced that he would retire from the role of Clerk of the Parliaments on 15 April 2017. On 23 December 2016 it was announced that Edward Ollard would succeed Beamish in his office.

== Honours ==
In the 2017 New Year Honours, Beamish was appointed Knight Commander of the Order of the Bath (KCB) for parliamentary service.

Government offices
Preceded by Michael Pownall	Clerk of the Parliaments; 2011–2017	Succeeded by Edward Ollard
