= Christian Allhusen =

Danish-English chemical manufacturer

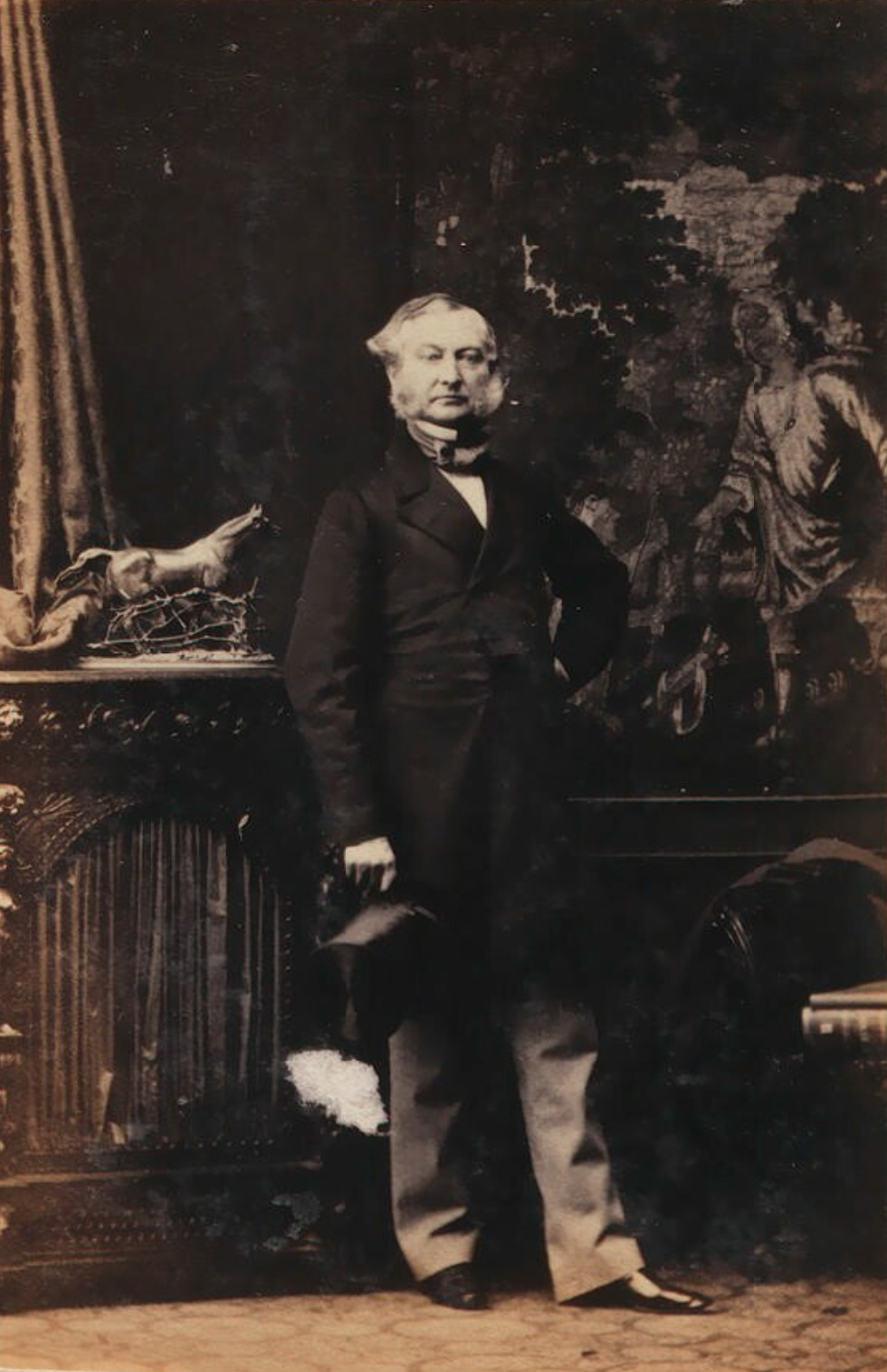
- Allhusen by Camille Silvy, 1862
- Born: Christian Augustus Heinrich Allhusen; 2 December 1806; Kiel, Duchy of Holstein, Denmark
- Died: 13 January 1890 (aged 83); Stoke Poges, Buckinghamshire
- Occupation: Businessman

Christian Augustus Henry Allhusen (2 December 1806 – 13 January 1890) was a Danish-born English chemical manufacturer based in the North East of England.

== Early life ==
Allhusen was born in Kiel when it was in the Danish Duchy of Holstein, the son of Carl Christian Friederich Allhusen and Anna Margarethe Schröder. He was of German and Danish descent. He and his family were displaced when Marshall Davoust, Napoleon's "Iron Marshall," occupied the family home as his headquarters.

== Career ==
Allhusen's Naturalization Act 1835
- Act of Parliament
- Parliament of the United Kingdom
- Long title: An Act for naturalizing Christian Allhusen.
- Citation: 5 & 6 Will. 4. c. 30 Pr.

Dates
- Royal assent: 12 June 1835

Allhusen was employed by Koch & Sons, grain merchants of Rostock and then moved to Newcastle, where he was employed by Campbell & Reveley, also grain merchants. Allhusen became a British citizen by a private act of Parliament, Allhusen's Naturalization Act 1835 (5 & 6 Will. 4. c. 30 Pr.). He later went into partnership with Henry Bolckow and expanded into the ship and insurance brokerage business.

In 1840, Allhusen purchased a soap works in Gateshead, and began the manufacture of chemicals, eventually calling the company C. Allhusen & Sons. In 1871, Allhusen converted his enterprise into a joint-stock company, Newcastle Chemical Works, Ltd. He made a large fortune, and was influential in the region as company director and shareholder in such companies as the Northumberland & Durham District Bank, the Newcastle & Gates Water Company and the Consett Iron Works. He was an active member of the Newcastle Chamber of Commerce and the Tyne Commission.

In 1854, Allhusen was among local industrialists urging construction of a new quay for Gateshead. When the quay was eventually constructed, the local government failed to include necessary transportation facilities to allow efficient transport to and from the quay facility. As a result, the quay complex required years of subsidies and struggled to avoid failure as Allhusen had predicted.

== Family ==
In 1835, Allhusen married Anne Shield (1813–1889), daughter of John Shield of Broomhaugh. They had four sons and seven daughters:

- Henry Christian (1835–1871), married Alice daughter of Thomas Eden of Norton Hall, Gloucester
- Emily (1837–1924), married firstly in 1860 Lt. Samuel Hall; married secondly, 1872 Rev. Marsden Gibson
- Capt. Frederic Buschek Ehrenberg (1838–1866), married in 1854 Isabel, daughter of W. Wright, judge advocate general of New Brunswick
- Christian Wilton (1841–1924) married Adelaide, daughter of Maj. Thomas Pakenham Vandeleur, of Clarina, County Limerick
- Julia (1842–1924), Roman Catholic nun at the Convent of Notre Dame, Wandsworth, London
- Col. William Hutt (1845–1923), married in 1876 Beatrice May, daughter of Col. Thomas Bromhead Butt
- Annie (1839–1935), married firstly Robert Laycock, and secondly Lord D'Arcy Godolphin Osborne, son of George Osborne, 8th Duke of Leeds.
- Blanche Alicia (1847–1929), married firstly in 1873 Henry Badeley, son of John Carr Badeley
- Mary Henrietta (1849–1937), married in 1870 Thomas Francis Hall Lloyd
- Alice Edith (1854–1930), married in 1882 Edward Horatio Nevile
- Helena Middleton (1858–1937), married in 1880 Edward Hugh Rowley Hibbert

Allhusen was the grandfather of Augustus Henry Eden Allhusen, Sir Joseph Laycock, Henry Badeley, 1st Baron Badeley; and great-grandfather of Derek Allhusen and Major-General Sir Robert Laycock.

Allhusen died in 1890 at his residence, Stoke Court, in Stoke Poges, Buckinghamshire.

== See also ==
- Oxford Dictionary of National Biography, Allhusen, Christian Augustus Henry (1806–1890), chemical manufacturer by N. G. Coley, rev.
