= John Gunthorpe =

English administrator

John Gunthorpe (died 1498) was an English administrator, Clerk of the Parliament, Keeper of the Privy Seal and Dean of Wells.

== Education and career ==
Gunthorpe was a student at Cambridge University and had already entered into the clergy and received holy orders. By private appointment he served as a secretary to Queen Elizabeth. By 1452 he was Master of Arts at Cambridge University and served as a junior proctor in 1454–5. Gunthorpe traveled to Italy and was in Ferrara in August 1460. He had been attending the lectures of Guarino da Verona on rhetoric at Ferrara. His teacher Guarino died at the end of 1460 and this may be why Gunthorpe moved on. In January 1462 Gunthorpe was formally taken into papal service. Pope Pius II examined Gunthorpe for fitness, and appointed him as a papal chaplain and minor penitentiary in St Peter's Basilica and in the Papal Curia. From 1460 to 1465, Gunthorpe went through a period of post-graduate study in Italy, where he perfected his Latin rhetorical style. He also learned Greek and presumably Italian, and gained experience in the international arena of the papal court.

== Service under the king ==
Gunthorpe returned to England in 1465 and became intimately integrated into the religious, diplomatic, financial, and political life of the court and government of Edward IV. Gunthorpe's involvement in Anglo-Castilian diplomacy concluded in 1470 when he was one of the ambassadors commissioned on 14 March by King Edward IV to embark upon an ultimately fruitless effort to persuade Enrique IV against the repudiation of the treaty between their kingdoms. Gunthorpe was in the royal household as a king's chaplain by the summer of 1466.

== 1468–1476 ==
In 1468, he returned to Cambridge University and was granted a baccalaureate in theology. On 9 December 1468, Gunthorpe became the king's almoner, the person who had charge of the king's charities from gifts of money to the distribution of surplus food from the king's table; the office can be traced back at least to the twelfth century. John Gunthorpe was the first person on record to have been called 'King's High Almoner'. He was also a warden. In 1471, he was appointed Clerk of the Parliament (as the office was then known), a position he held until 1483.

In 1472, Gunthorpe became a monk at St. Stephen's chapel and remained a monk of St. Stephen's for the rest of his life. He was also a monk of many other chapels. However, even though he was a monk at all of these chapels, his place of residence was with the king. In 1476 he became dean of the king's household chapel, with supervisory authority over every aspect of the chapel's function.

John Gunthorpe is described as clerk and warden of the college of King's Hall, University of Cambridge in 1473.

== Later life ==
On 10 November 1481 a group of nine men, among whom Gunthorpe was named first, obtained a royal licence to found and endow a guild in the parish church of St Mary in North Somercotes, Lincolnshire. On 9 April 1483, Gunthorpe's patron and benefactor King Edward IV died at Westminster Palace. On 10 May Gunthorpe was appointed Keeper of the Privy Seal under the authority of Richard of Gloucester. Richard had formally been named protector two days before and as King Richard III he reappointed Gunthorpe on 27 June The appointment was reiterated on 6 July, the day of Richard's magnificent coronation ceremony in Westminster Abbey. John was the only Keeper of the Privy Seal to serve Richard III. He was not seen as a very wise choice of keeper since he was the former secretary of Queen Elizabeth, and Richard was fearful of a Woodville faction in 1483.

While serving as Keeper of the Privy Seal, Gunthorpe served his king in Anglo-Scottish diplomacy by truce-making in Scotland, and extension of a truce with Francis II, Duke of Brittany; he also helped work out a truce with the Tudor family in Brittany in October 1483, which was extended to 1492

== Why picked? ==
Gunthorpe's geographical origins might have recommended him to Richard in 1483 and Gunthorpe was a learned man. But it is the perennial enigma of Richard III that brings attention to Gunthorpe. In 1485, Richard gave Gunthorpe a present - the swans in the waters of Somerset, the birds having a long association with royalty and chivalry.

== Tudor authority ==
Richard III died on 22 August 1485 and Gunthorpe went to service under Henry Tudor – Henry VII. Also soon after Richard III died Gunthorpe became the resident Dean of Wells. As the Dean of Wells, Gunthorpe's interests extended into the judicial sphere through the court Christian within his authority.

He presided over many cases, including the case of John Pope.

== Last years and death ==
In the last year of his life, Gunthorpe found himself playing host to the king. Gunthorpe was a man of learning, a rhetorician and linguist, a priest and theologian, and an experienced diplomat and secretary, but left no substantial literary remains. On 25 June 1498, John Gunthorpe died. He is buried in St Katherine's Chapel, Wells Cathedral.
