= Michael Wheeler-Booth =

British public servant and Clerk of the Parliaments

Sir Michael Addison John Wheeler-Booth KCB (25 February 1934 – 26 March 2018) was a British public servant and Clerk of the Parliaments. He was educated at Leighton Park School, Reading, and Magdalen College, Oxford.

He became a Clerk in the House of Lords in 1960, and spent his career in the service of the House apart from a period of secondment to HM Treasury from 1965 to 1969. From 1965 to 1967, he was Private Secretary to the Leader of the House (Lord Longford) and Government Chief Whip (Lord Shepherd). From 1967 to 1969, he was Joint Secretary of the Inter-Party Conference on House of Lords Reform.

In 1973, he was clerk of the House of Lords Select Committee on Procedures for Scrutiny of Proposals for European Instruments chaired by the former House of Commons Speaker Lord Maybray-King. The Committee recommended the setting up of the House of Lords European Communities Committee (since 1999 the European Union Committee) to scrutinise proposal for Community legislation, and he became that Committee's first clerk (1974 to 1983).

He served as Reading Clerk from 1983 to 1988 and Clerk Assistant from 1988 to 1990. In January 1991 he was appointed Clerk of the Parliaments. He was appointed a Knight Commander of the Order of the Bath in the Queen's Birthday Honours in June 1994. He retired at the beginning of 1997.

From 1998 to June 2009, he was a Special Lecturer in Politics at Magdalen College, Oxford. He was made an Honorary Fellow of the college in 2003.

In 1999 he served as a member of the Royal Commission on Reform of the House of Lords, chaired by Lord Wakeham, whose Report was published in January 2000.

From 2002 to 2004 he was a member of the Commission on Powers and Electoral Arrangements of the National Assembly for Wales chaired by Lord Richard (the Richard Commission).

In 1982 he married Emily Smith (author of The Good Manners Prize (1996) and other children's books). They had two daughters and a son.
