= Henry Hayter =

Henry Heylyn Hayter CMG FRGS (28 October 1821 – 23 March 1895) was an English-born Australian statistician

== Life ==
Hayter was the son of Henry Hayter and his wife Eliza Jane née Heylyn, and was born at Eden Vale, Wiltshire, England. He was educated at Charterhouse School and at Paris, and entered the Merchant Navy as a midshipman. He emigrated to Victoria, Australia in December 1852.

Hayter married Susan Dodd, daughter of William Dodd, in 1855 and they had a son. Henry's brother Harrison Hayter was a distinguished civil engineer in England.

== Sources ==
Harris, Charles Alexander (1901). "Hayter, Henry Heylyn" . In Lee, Sidney (ed.). Dictionary of National Biography (1st supplement). London: Smith, Elder & Co.
