= Henry Elsynge =

English administrator

- Born: c.1606
- Died: c.30 September 1656 (aged 49–50); Hounslow, Middlesex
- Burial place: St. Margaret's, Westminster
- Education: Westminster School, Christ Church, Oxford
- Occupation: administrator
- Years active: c.1632–1648
- Known for: Clerk of the House of Commons
- Notable work: during the Long Parliament
- Parents: Henry Elsynge (father); Blanche Hyett (mother)

Henry Elsynge (c.1606 – 30 September 1656) was an English administrator, who acted as clerk of the House of Commons, and wrote on parliamentary procedure.

== Life ==
Elsynge was the eldest son of Henry Elsynge and his wife Blanche Hyett; and was baptised at St Dunstan-in-the-West on 2 March 1606. He was educated at Westminster School under L. Osbeldiston. Elsynge entered Christ Church, Oxford, as a commoner, in 1621, proceeding B.A. 1625. After he spent seven years in foreign travel, Archbishop William Laud procured him the appointment of clerk of the House of Commons. His work was significant during the Long Parliament.

In December 1648, Elsynge resigned his appointment on a pretext, to avoid taking part in the proceedings against Charles I. He retired to Hounslow in Middlesex, where he died. He was buried in St. Margaret's, Westminster, on 30 September 1656.

== Works ==
Elsynge was a scholarly man who numbered Bulstrode Whitelocke and John Selden among his friends. His works are:

- A Tract concerning Proceedings in Parliament.
- A Remonstrance of the State of the Kingdom (1641), reprinted in Edward Husband's Remonstrances (1643) and in John Rushworth's Historical Collection (1721).
