= Plashet School =

Plashet, City of London Academy

Location
- Plashet Grove; East Ham, London, E6 1DG; England; 51.5396°N 0.0498°E

Information
- Type: Academy
- Motto: Community, Equality, Achievement
- Established: 1932
- Local authority: London Borough of Newham
- Trust: City of London Academies Trust
- Department for Education URN: 152267 Tables
- Ofsted: Reports
- Head teacher: Rachel McGowan
- Gender: Girls
- Age: 11 to 16
- Enrolment: 1500
- Colour: blue black white
- Website: https://plashet.cola.org.uk/

Plashet, City of London Academy (formerly Plashet School) is a non-selective secondary girls' school located in East Ham within the London Borough of Newham, East London, United Kingdom. Originally established as a grammar school, it is now an 11–16 comprehensive academy accommodating approximately 1,470 students with a capacity of 1,500. On 1 January 2026, the school converted to academy status and joined the City of London Academies Trust. Prior to conversion, the predecessor school was rated "Good" overall by Ofsted in November 2022, with "Outstanding" judgements for behaviour and attitudes and personal development. Department for Education performance data shows student attainment scores consistently above both borough and national averages.

== History ==
Plashet dates back to 1932 when the East Ham Grammar School for Girls first opened on the South site. In the 1950s, the North site was built, and Plashet County Secondary Modern School for Girls was opened. These two schools were merged into Plashet School in 1972. In 2000, the two sites on either side of Plashet Grove were physically linked by the Plashet Unity Bridge, a 67-metre covered footbridge designed by Birds Portchmouth Russum Architects and structural engineers Techniker. Built to give students safe, traffic-free passage between buildings, the bridge won a RIBA Award in 2001.

In 1990, Bushra Nasir joined Plashet School as deputy headteacher before becoming headteacher in 1993. She was the first Muslim woman to become headteacher of a UK comprehensive school. She served as president of the Muslim Teachers' Association, was appointed a CBE in 2003, and was named Professional of the Year at the 2005 Asian Women of Achievement Awards. Nasir retired in 2012 and was succeeded as headteacher by Rachel McGowan.

On 1 January 2026, the school converted to academy status, joining the City of London Academies Trust and adopting the name Plashet, City of London Academy.

== Campus and admissions ==
The school occupies a split-site campus on Plashet Grove in East Ham, within walking distance of East Ham tube station and High Street North. It operates as a 10-form-entry comprehensive school admitting 300 girls into Year 7 each year, with an overall capacity of 1,500 pupils.

== Ofsted inspections and academic performance ==
In March 2008, Plashet School was judged "Outstanding" by Ofsted and was subsequently highlighted by the inspectorate in 2009 as one of twelve outstanding schools serving disadvantaged communities. At its most recent full inspection prior to academy conversion, in November 2022, Ofsted rated the school "Good" overall, with "Outstanding" judgements for both behaviour and attitudes and personal development.

According to Department for Education performance data, the school's GCSE results—including its Attainment 8 score and the proportion of pupils achieving grade 5 or above in English and mathematics—consistently exceed both Newham and national averages.

== Notable former pupils ==
- Lyn Brown – Former Labour MP for West Ham (2005 - 2024)
- Rokhsana Fiaz – Former Mayor of Newham (2018 - 2026)
- Baroness Uddin – First female Muslim in the House of Lords who came to prominence for her role in the parliamentary expenses scandal
