= Robert Overbury =

British public servant and Clerk of the Parliaments from 1949 to 1955

Sir Robert Leslie Overbury, KCB (26 July 1887 – 11 January 1955) was a British public servant and Clerk of the Parliaments from 1949 to 1955.

Privately educated, Overbury began his career as a third-class clerk in the Royal Courts of Justice. In 1915, he was appointed to represent the lower-grade clerks' grievances about their working practices to the Lord Chancellor's Department; he impressed the Permanent Secretary, Sir Claud Schuster, who had him transferred to the House of Lords. He was appointed to the Lord Chancellor's Department in 1923 as Secretary of Commissions, and in 1930 became Chief Clerk and Establishments Officer. In 1934, he was appointed Second Clerk at the Table, Reading Clerk and Clerk of Outdoor Committees at the House of Lords. Promotion followed in 1937, when he became Clerk Assistant to the Parliaments and then, on Sir Henry Badeley's retirement in 1949, he was appointed Clerk of the Parliaments. He retired, aged 66, in 1953.

Overbury had been appointed a Companion of the Order of the Bath in 1941, and promoted to Knight Commander in 1950. He died on 11 January 1955.
