= Peter Henderson, Baron Henderson of Brompton =

British public servant

The Right Honourable The Lord Henderson of Brompton KCB

Clerk of the Parliaments
- In office 1974–1983
- Preceded by: Sir David Stephens
- Succeeded by: Sir John Sainty

Member of the House of Lords
- Lord Temporal
- Life peerage 1 February 1984 – 13 January 2000

Personal details
- Born: Peter Gordon Henderson; 16 September 1922
- Died: London
- Children: Sir Launcelot Henderson
- Education: Magdalen College, Oxford
- Awards: Order of Bath (1975)

Military service
- Unit: Scots Guards
- Battles/wars: Second World War: Battle of Anzio

Peter Gordon Henderson, Baron Henderson of Brompton KCB (16 September 1922 – 13 January 2000) was a British public servant who served as Clerk of the Parliaments from 1974 to 1983.

He was born into a Scottish family, the son of James Alexander Leo Henderson and Maud Sophia Grace Hardy. Henderson was educated at Dragon School and Stowe School and Magdalen College, Oxford. He served with the Scots Guards during the Second World until he was seriously wounded in 1944 during the Battle of Anzio, sustaining injuries from which he never fully recovered, despite undergoing multiple operations over the years. His brother John Patrick Leo Henderson MC was killed in action in Italy in 1944.

Having been appointed a Knight Commander of the Order of the Bath in 1975, he was created a life peer as Baron Henderson of Brompton, of Brompton in the Royal Borough of Kensington and Chelsea and of Brough in the County of Cumbria on 1 February 1984, a nod to the holiday cottage in Brough, Cumbria he owned for more than four decades.

Henderson was a crusader for civil rights in the House of Lords. He fought for legal abortion and defended embryology research and in vitro fertilisation: "His battle for gay rights – as against article 28 – was part of his crusade against those underprivileged by discrimination, including young criminals, schizophrenics and homeless mothers with children."

His son is the Appeal Court judge Sir Launcelot Henderson.

He died in London on 13 January 2000.
