= Harrison Hayter =

British engineer (1825–1898)

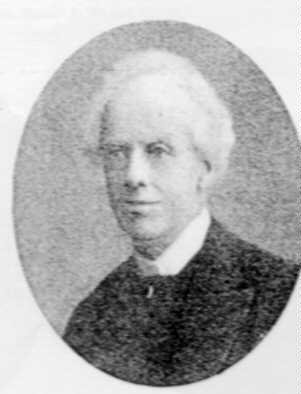
- Born: 10 April 1825; Flushing, Cornwall, UK
- Died: 5 May 1898 (aged 73); Buenos Aires, Argentina
- Spouse: Eliza Jane Walker
- Children: Eight
- Engineering career
- Discipline: Civil,
- Institutions: Institution of Civil Engineers (president),
- Projects: Charing Cross Railway Bridge, Cannon Street Railway Bridge, Clifton Suspension Bridge

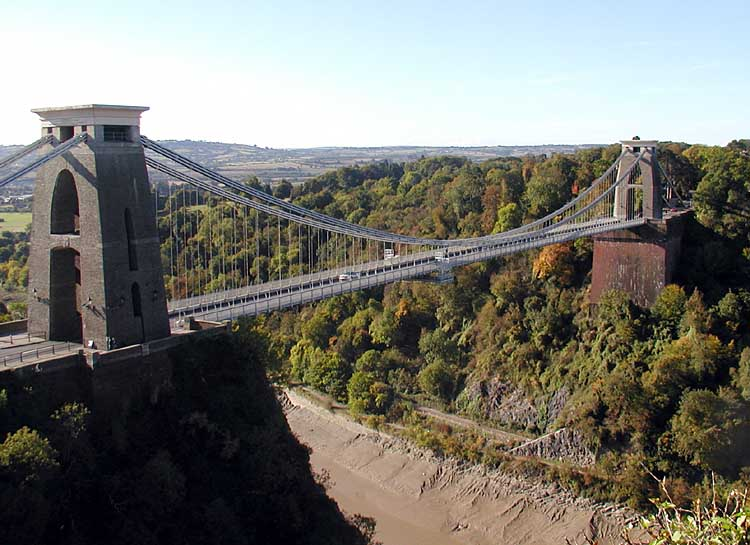
Clifton Suspension Bridge

Harrison Hayter (10 April 1825 – 5 May 1898) was a British engineer, participating in many significant railway construction projects in Britain and many harbour and dock constructions worldwide.

== Biography ==
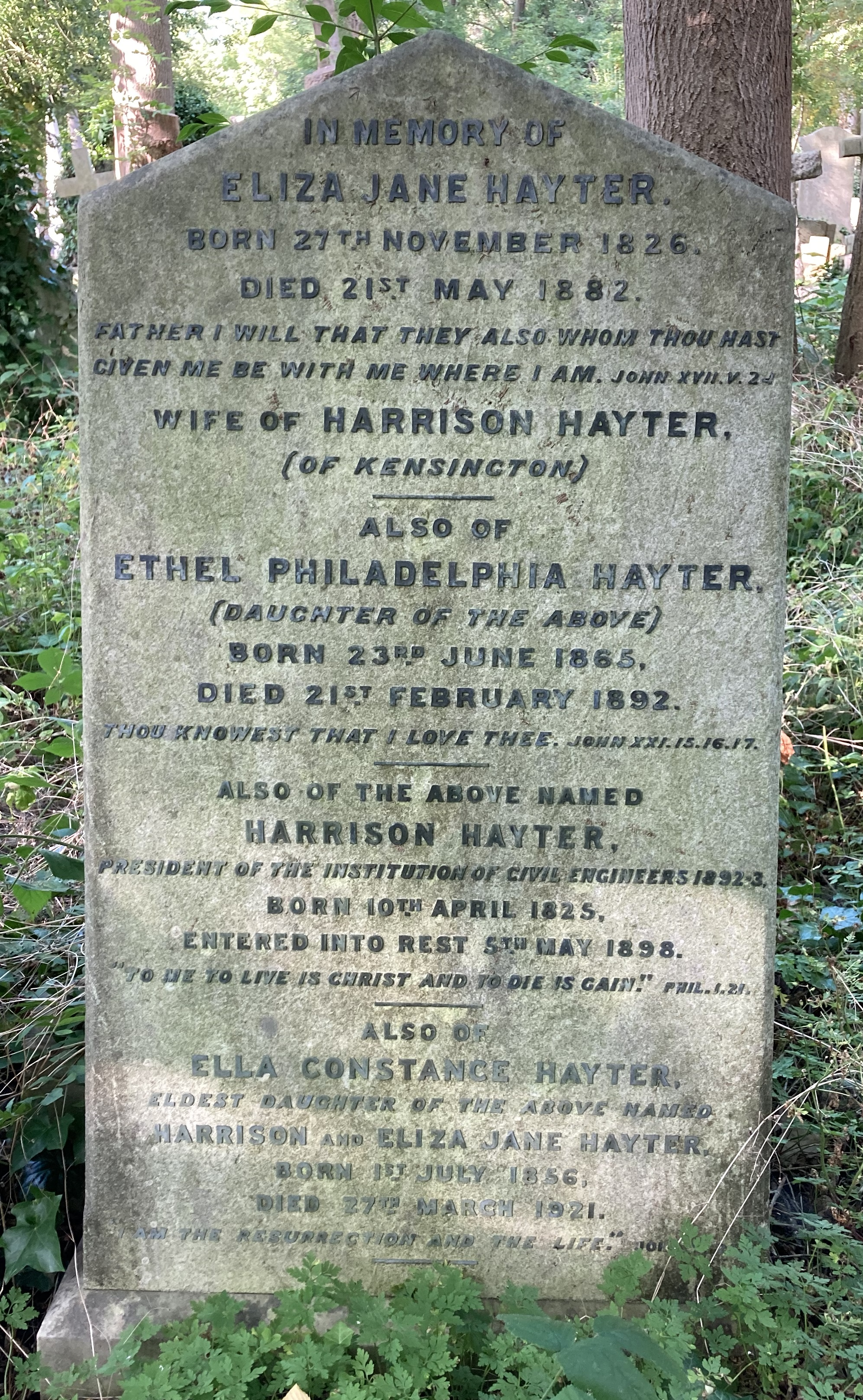
Family grave of Harrison Hayter in Highgate Cemetery

Hayter was born at Flushing near Falmouth, Cornwall the second son of Henry Hayter and his wife Eliza Jane Heylyn. He became a Civil Engineer, and began his professional training on the Stockton and Darlington Railway and then in the construction of the Great Northern Railway. In 1856 he was living in Anglesey, while working on the construction of Holyhead Harbour.

In 1857 he joined Sir John Hawkshaw and was associated with most of his projects until Sir John retired in 1888. These including the Lancashire and Yorkshire Railway, Charing Cross and Cannon Street Lines, East London Railway, completion of Inner Circle, the Severn Tunnel Railway and many overseas railways. The bridges he helped build included the Charing Cross Railway Bridge, in 1864 he was awarded a Telford Medal by the Institution of Civil Engineers for his paper 'On the Charing Cross Bridge', the Cannon Street Railway Bridge and the Clifton Suspension Bridge. Harbours were at Alderney, IJmuiden (Holland) and Mornungao (India) and docks at Hull, Penarth, Maryport, Fleetwood, Dover and the South dock of the West India Docks. Other works included the Amsterdam Ship Canal, the foundation of the Spithead Forts, River Witham middle level, Thames Valley drainages, and sewerage in Brighton. When he died he was completing a large system of docks at Buenos Aires (a dredged channel 14 miles (23 km) long and a 3.5-mile (5.6 km) river frontage), where James Murray Dobson was the resident engineer.

Harrison was a Lieutenant-Colonel in the Engineer and Railway Volunteer Staff Corps and served as President of the Institution of Civil Engineers between May 1892 and May 1893.

He was buried on the eastern side of Highgate Cemetery.

Harrison was a younger brother of Henry Heylyn Hayter the Australian statistician. In 1854 he married Eliza Jane Walker (1827–1882), the eldest daughter of Rev Thomas Walker, Rector of Offord D'Arcy, Huntingdonshire and a Lincolnshire landowner. They had eight children including Rev. William Thomas Baring Hayter and Frances Jane Hayter who married Falconer Madan (1851–1935), Librarian of the Bodleian Library of the University of Oxford. He is the great great grandfather of Paul Hayter.

== Publications ==
- An Account of the Construction of large Breakwaters at Holyhead.
- Details of the Construction of Charing Cross Railway Bridge
- Construction of Amsterdam Ship Canal

Professional and academic associations
Preceded by George Berkley	President of the Institution of Civil Engineers; May 1892 – May 1893	Succeeded by Alfred Giles
