= John Carr Badeley =

English physician

- Born: 1794; christened 3 August 1794; Chelmsford, Essex, England
- Died: 22 September 1851 (aged 57)
- Occupation: physician
- Known for: Harveian Oration (1849)

John Carr Badeley (1794–1851) was an English physician.

== Biography ==
After education at King Edward VI Grammar School, Chelmsford and at Charterhouse, he matriculated on 16 March 1812 at Gonville and Caius College, Cambridge. He graduated there MB (Cantab.) in 1817 and MD in 1822.

Badeley was physician to Chelmsford Dispensary for twenty years. He was also inspecting physician to the lunatic asylums in Essex. He was elected FRCP in 1825. He gave the Harveian Oration in 1849 and the Lumleian Lectures in 1851.

On 9 April 1835 he married Althea Faithfull Fanshawe. They had five sons and six daughters. Among their five sons was Captain Henry Badeley, who was the father of Henry John Fanshawe Badeley, 1st Baron Badeley.
