= Michael Pownall =

British civil servant

Sir Michael Pownall KCB

Clerk of the Parliaments
- In office 4 November 2007 – 15 April 2011
- Preceded by: Sir Paul Hayter
- Succeeded by: Sir David Beamish

Personal details
- Born: Michael Graham Pownall; 11 October 1949 (age 77)
- Citizenship: United Kingdom
- Spouse: Deborah Pownall (m. 1974; died 2013)
- Children: Two
- Education: Repton School; University of Exeter

Sir Michael Graham Pownall, KCB (born 11 October 1949) is a retired British public servant. From 2007 to 2011, he was Clerk of the Parliaments in the House of Lords of the United Kingdom.

== Early life and education ==
Pownall was born on 11 October 1949. He was educated at Repton School, then an all-boys private school in Repton, Derbyshire. He studied at the University of Exeter.

== Career ==
He became a Clerk in the House of Lords in 1971. From 1980 to 1983 he was seconded to the Cabinet Office as Private Secretary to the Leader of the House of Lords and the Government Chief Whip, serving two Leaders, Lord Soames and Baroness Young, and one Chief Whip, Lord Denham. He was Reading Clerk from 1997 to 2003, and Clerk Assistant from 2003 to 2007. From 2007 to 2011, he was Clerk of the Parliaments in the House of Lords of the United Kingdom. He retired on 15 April 2011.

== Personal life ==
In 1974, Pownall married Deborah Ann McQueen. Together they had two daughters. Deborah died in 2013.

Pownall is an Anglican Christian. He is the treasurer of St Michael and All Angels, Bedford Park, an Anglo-Catholic church in Chiswick where he lives.

== Honours ==
In the 2011 Birthday Honours, Pownall was appointed Knight Commander of the Order of the Bath (KCB), and therefore granted the title sir.
