= Clerk of the Parliaments =

Chief clerk of the House of Lords

- The Crowned Portcullis
- Incumbent; Chloe Mawson since 2 April 2026
- Clerk of the Parliaments' Office
- Appointer: Monarch of the United Kingdom
- Formation: 1315
- First holder: John Kirkby

The Clerk of the Parliaments is the chief clerk of the House of Lords in the Parliament of the United Kingdom. The position has existed since at least 1315, and duties include preparing the minutes of Lords proceedings, advising on proper parliamentary procedure and pronouncing royal assent. Many of the Clerk's duties are now fulfilled by their deputies and the Clerk of the Parliaments' Office.

The Under Clerk of the Parliaments is the formal name for the Clerk of the House of Commons.

The term Clerk of the Parliaments is also used as a formal alternative title by the Clerk of the Senate of Canada and the Clerks of the Legislative Councils of New South Wales and Western Australia. In the Australian state of Victoria the title is given to the longer-serving of the Clerks of the Legislative Council and Legislative Assembly. The title was also formerly used for the Clerk of the Australian Senate and the longer-serving of the Clerks of the Legislative Council and Legislative Assembly of South Australia.

== History ==
The position has existed since at least 1315, when records from the parliament held by Edward II at Lincoln make reference to a clerk nominated by the king to serve as a "special deputy". This clerk was tasked with reading out the titles of bills and the responses from Parliament. In later parliaments starting with those under Richard II, the Clerk of the Crown in Chancery would read the titles, and the Clerk of the Parliaments the responses. The actual term Clerk of the Parliaments did not come into use until the reign of Henry VIII, and the plural (parliaments, rather than Parliament) signifies that it is a life appointment – the clerk is appointed for all parliaments, not just the one currently sitting. On 12 March 1660 a deputy clerk was appointed for the first time after the clerk (Mr Bowyer) was too ill to attend Parliament. The Clerk of the Parliaments Act 1824 (5 Geo. 4. c. 82) defined the clerk's duties for the first time in statute, and the act is still in force and binding on current clerks.

== Appointment and duties ==
The Clerk of the Parliaments is appointed by letters patent from the sovereign, who also holds the sole power to remove him or her. The Clerk has a variety of tasks within the House of Lords. Appointees were originally ecclesiastical figures, although the nineteenth century saw a shift towards members of the legal profession. They are assisted by two other clerks – the Clerk Assistant and the Reading Clerk.

The Clerk of the Parliaments, or another clerk, sits in the chamber at the table of the house during sittings, and calls on items of business. At the start of a sitting all three table clerks (Clerk of the Parliaments, Clerk Assistant and Reading Clerk) are normally present. When at the table the Clerk wears court dress (including a tail coat and waistcoat), a gown and a wig. The wig worn by the Clerk of the Parliaments is a bench wig as worn by a High Court judge; other clerks wear a barrister's wig. Male clerks wear a wing collar and white bow tie, and female clerks bands as worn by barristers.

As well as providing advice on procedure, the clerk also prepares the minutes of proceedings in the Lords, signs all official documents and communications, returns bills to the House of Commons and pronounces royal assent. The clerk also supervises several offices, including their own (the Clerk of the Parliaments' Office), Black Rod's Department, which deals with security in the Lords, the Committee Office, which gives legal and procedural advice to committees within the Lords, and formerly (until 2009) the Judicial Office, which advised and assisted the Law Lords. Since the nineteenth century many of these duties have been performed by their deputies and their own office.

== Office holders ==
| Term | Name | Notes |
|---|---|---|
| ?1280–1290 | John Kirkby | |
| 1290–1314 | Gilbert of Rothbury | |
| 1315 | Robert of Ashby | |
| 1316– | William of Airmyn | |
| c1327 – post 1334 | Henry of Edenstowe | |
| c. 1340 – c. 1346 | Thomas of Brayton | |
| in office 1351 & 1352 | John of Coddington | |
| in office 1377 | Geoffrey Martin | |
| in office 1377 | Edmund Brudenell | |
| ?1372–1386 | Richard de Ravenser | |
| ?c1381 | John de Waltham | |
| ante 1384–1394 | John de Scarle | |
| 1394–1414 | John Rome | |
| 1414–1423 | John Frank | |
| 1424–1436 | William Prestwyke | |
| 1437–1438 | John Bate | |
| 1438–1447 | Thomas Kirkby | |
| 1447–1470 | John Fawkes | |
| 1470–1471 | Baldwin Hyde | |
| 1471–1483 | John Gunthorpe | |
| 1483–1485 | Thomas Hutton | |
| 1485–1496 | John Morgan | |
| 1496–1509 | Richard Hatton | |
| 1509–1523 | John Taylor | |
| 1523–1531 | Brian Tuke | |
| 1531–1540 | Edward North | |
| 1540–1541 | Thomas Soulemont | |
| 1541–1543 | William Paget | |
| NA | Thomas Knight | |
| 1550–1551 | John Mason | |
| 1574–NA | Francis Spelman | |
| 1574–1597 | Anthony Mason | |
| 1597–1609 | Thomas Smith | Knighted 1603 |
| 1609–1621 | Robert Bowyer | |
| 1621–1635 | Henry Elsynge | |
| 1635–1637 | Thomas Knyvett | |
| 1637–1638 | Daniel Bedingfield | |
| 1638–1644 | John Browne | |
| 1644 | Edward Norgate | |
| 1649–1660 | Henry Scobell | |
| 1660–1691 | John Browne | |
| 1691–1716 | Matthew Johnson | |
| 1716–1740 | William Cowper | |
| 1740–1788 | Ashley Cowper | |
| 1788–1818 | George Rose | |
| 1818–1855 | George Henry Rose | |
| 1855–1875 | John Shaw-Lefevre | |
| 1875–1885 | Sir William Rose | |
| 1885–1917 | Sir Henry Graham | |
| 1917–1930 | Sir Arthur Thring | |
| 1930–1934 | Sir Edward Alderson | |
| 1934–1949 | Sir Henry Badeley | |
| 1949–1953 | Sir Robert Overbury | |
| 1953–1959 | Sir Francis Lascelles | |
| 1959–1963 | Sir Victor Goodman | |
| 1963–1974 | Sir David Stephens | |
| 1974–1983 | Sir Peter Henderson | |
| 1983–1990 | Sir John Sainty | |
| 2 January 1991 – 4 January 1997 | Sir Michael Wheeler-Booth | |
| 4 January 1997 – 13 July 2003 | Sir Michael Davies | |
| 14 July 2003 – 3 November 2007 | Sir Paul Hayter | Knighted 2007 |
| 4 November 2007 – 15 April 2011 | Sir Michael Pownall | Knighted 2011 |
| 16 April 2011 – 15 April 2017 | Sir David Beamish | Knighted 2017 |
| 18 April 2017 – 1 April 2021 | Sir Edward Ollard | Knighted 2021 |
| 2 April 2021 – 1 April 2026 | Sir Simon Burton | Knighted 2026 |
| 2 April 2026 – present | Chloe Mawson | First woman to hold the post |

== Bibliography ==
- Pollard, A.F. (1942). "The Clerk of the Crown". The English Historical Review. 57 (227). Oxford University Press: 312–333. doi:10.1093/ehr/lvii.ccxxvii.312. ISSN 0013-8266.
- Macqueen, John Fraser (1842). A practical treatise on the appellate jurisdiction of the House of Lords & Privy Council: together with the practice on parliamentary divorce. A. Maxwell & son. OCLC 60725157.
- The Stationery Office (2007). Companion to the standing orders and guide to the proceedings of the House of Lords: laid on the table by the clerk of the parliaments (21st ed.). The Stationery Office. ISBN 978-0-10-400709-9.
- Todd, Alpheus (1840). The practice and privileges of the two Houses of Parliament: with an appendix of forms. Rogers & Thompson. ISBN 0-665-27779-2. OCLC 16440023.
