= Underwood =

Underwood may refer to:

== People ==
- Underwood (surname), people with the surname

== Places ==
=== Australia ===
- Underwood, Queensland, a suburb of Logan City, Australia
- Underwood, Tasmania, a locality

=== United Kingdom ===
- Underwood, Devon, a location
- Underwood, Newport, village in Wales
- Underwood, Nottinghamshire, village in England
- Underwood, Pembrokeshire, a location
- Weston Underwood, Buckinghamshire, village in England
- Weston Underwood, Derbyshire, village in England
- Wotton Underwood, village in England

=== Canada ===
- Underwood, Markham, Ontario, an unincorporated community now within the city of Markham
- Underwood, Bruce County, Ontario, a village

=== United States ===
- Underwood, Shelby County, Alabama, a place in Alabama
- Underwood-Petersville, Alabama, a census-designated place
- Underwood, Indiana, an unincorporated community
- Underwood, Iowa, a city
- Underwood, Minnesota, a city
- Underwood Township, Redwood County, Minnesota, a township
- Underwood, New York, a hamlet within the town of North Hudson
- Underwood, North Dakota, a city
- New Underwood, South Dakota, a city
- Underwood, Washington, an unincorporated community

== Other uses ==
- trees and shrubs in the understorey of a forest
- the wood material under a veneer layer
- Underwood (Ninjago), a character in Ninjago
- Underwood & Underwood, early producer and distributor of stereoscopic images
- Underwood-Memorial Hospital, Woodbury, New Jersey, USA
- Underwood tariff (see Revenue Act of 1913), US tax law
- Underwood Typewriter Company, typewriter manufacturer
- USS Underwood (FFG-36), US Navy ship
- William Underwood Company, 19th- and 20th-century maker of condiments and packaged meat and fish
- Underwood Dudley, American mathematician
- Mount Underwood (New Zealand), mountain near Milford Sound

== See also ==
- Undervud, Ukrainian musical group
- Justice Underwood (disambiguation)
