= Underwood (surname) =

Origin
- Meaning: "under or below wood"
- Region of origin: England
- Frequency and comparison

Underwood is a surname of English topographic origin.

== History ==
Deriving from the Old English "unter", or Angeln (Danish-German)/Scandivadian equivalent—a preposition meaning "under" or "below"—plus "wuda", a wood, leading to the Saxon expression "unterwuda" sounding like "oontawooda". The name was originally given to one dwelling at the foot of a wood or literally "below the trees of a forest". The name may also be locational from three places named with these elements, e.g. Underwood in Derbyshire, England, and Underwood, Nottinghamshire, England. The surname is first recorded in the latter half of the 12th century (see below). One William Underwude appears in the 1219 Assize Court Rolls of Yorkshire, and a William under the Wode in the 1332 Subsidy Rolls of Staffordshire. From the beginning of the surviving parish registers in 1559 there were Underwoods recorded in Pickering parish, North Yorkshire, England. On 2 January 1634, one Joseph Underwood, aged 23 yrs., embarked from London on the ship Bonaventure bound for Virginia. He was one of the earliest recorded name bearers to enter America. No less than seven coats of arms were granted to families of this name; a particular namebearer mentioned in the Dictionary of National Biography was one Michael Underwood (1737–1820), who practised in London as a surgeon and as a "male-midwife". The first recorded spelling of the family name is shown to be that of William de Underwode which was dated 1188, in the "Records of Bury St. Edmunds, Suffolk", during the reign of King Henry II, known as "The Builder of Churches", 1154–1189.

== People ==
=== Surname ===
==== General ====
- Adin Ballou Underwood (1828–1888), American general
- Antony Underwood, Australian scientist
- April Underwood, tech investor
- Barbara Underwood (born 1944), American lawyer
- Cecil F. Underwood (1867–1943), British scientific collector
- Cecilia Underwood, 1st Duchess of Inverness (c. 1785–1873), British peer
- Edmund Underwood (182?–1863), U.S. Army officer 1848–1863
- Edmund Beardsley Underwood (1853–1928), American naval officer, son of Edmund Underwood
- Edward Ellsworth Underwood (1864–1942), American medical doctor, minister
- Elizabeth Underwood (c. 1794–1858), Australian land owner
- Eric Underwood (1905–1980), Australian scientist
- Francis Henry Underwood (1825–1894), American biographer and diplomat
- George V. Underwood Jr. (1913–1984), American army general
- Gordon Waite Underwood (1932–1978), American naval officer
- Grant Underwood (born 1954), American Mormon historian
- Horace Grant Underwood (1859–1916), American missionary and founder of Yonsei University in Korea
- James Underwood (1771–1844) Australian merchant
- James Underwood (born 1942), British pathologist
- Janice Underwood, American educator
- Jim Underwood, American management professor
- John Underwood (PR adviser), British public relation adviser
- John Thomas Underwood (1857–1937), founder of the Underwood Typewriter Company
- Joseph Edwin Underwood (1882–1960), Canadian engineer
- Julie K. Underwood, American academic
- Kevin Ray Underwood (1979–2024), American executed murderer
- Key Underwood, founder of the Coon Dog Cemetery
- Lucien Marcus Underwood (1853–1907), American botanist and mycologist
- Naomi Tacuyen Underwood, Filipina-American journalist and AAPI activist
- Peter Underwood (1937–2014), Australian judge and government official
- Peter Underwood (parapsychologist) (1923–2014), English author, broadcaster and paranormalist
- Robert C. Underwood (1915–1988), American jurist from Illinois
- Rory Underwood (born 1992), Company Director of Rormat ltd
- William D. Underwood, American university president

==== Arts ====
- Blair Underwood (born 1964), American actor
- Brittany Underwood (born 1988), American actress
- Carrie Underwood (born 1983), American singer and winner of the American Idol TV series in 2005
- Charles Underwood (1791–1883), English architect
- Edna W. Underwood (1873–1961), American author, poet, and translator
- Frank Underwood (English musician)
- Franklin Underwood, American musical theatre composer
- George Allen Underwood (1793–1829), English architect
- Gilbert Stanley Underwood (1890–1960), American architect
- Henry Underwood (architect, born 1787) (1787–1868), English architect
- Henry Jones Underwood (1804–1852), English architect
- Ian Underwood (born 1939), musician
- Jay Underwood (born 1968), American actor
- Katie Underwood (born 1975), Australian singer-songwriter
- Larry Underwood (born 1966), American actor
- Lee Underwood (born 1938), American musician
- Leon Underwood (1890–1975), British artist
- Loyal Underwood (1893–1966), American actor
- Matt Underwood (born 1968), American sports announcer
- Michael Underwood (born 1975), British television presenter
- Mick Underwood (1945–2024), British drummer
- Ron Underwood (born 1953), American film director
- Ron Underwood (musician)
- Ruth Underwood (born 1946), American musician
- Sam Underwood (born 1987), American actor
- Sam Underwood (born 1990), British writer, director and actor
- Sara Jean Underwood (born 1984), American model, actress, and Playboy Playmate
- Sheryl Underwood (born 1963), American comedian
- Wilbur Underwood (1874–1935), American poet
- William Lyman Underwood (1864–1929), American photographer

==== Politicians ====
- Cecil H. Underwood (1922–2008), American politician
- Henry Underwood (politician) (1863–1945), Australian politician
- Jim Underwood (politician), American politician
- John C. Underwood (1840–1913), American politician and judge
- John Curtiss Underwood (1809–1873), American abolitionist, politician and judge
- John W. H. Underwood (1816–1888), American politician
- Joseph R. Underwood (1791–1876), American politician
- Lauren Underwood (born 1986), American politician
- Mell G. Underwood (1892–1972), American politician
- Nerissa Bretania Underwood, Guamanian politician
- Oscar Underwood (1862–1929), American politician
- Robert A. Underwood (born 1948), American politician from Guam
- Thomas Underwood (1863–1948), Canadian politician
- Thomas R. Underwood (1898–1956), American politician
- Warner Underwood (1808–1872), American politician

==== Sports ====
- Brad Underwood (born 1963) basketball coach at the University of Illinois at Urbana–Champaign
- Derek Underwood (1945–2024), English cricketer
- Dimitrius Underwood (born 1977), American football defensive end
- Duane Underwood Jr. (born 1994), American baseball player
- E. J. Underwood (born 1983), American football cornerback
- Fred Underwood (1868–1906), American baseball pitcher
- George Underwood (athlete) (1884–1943), American track and field athlete
- Lake Underwood (1926–2008), American race car driver
- Marviel Underwood (born 1982), American football safety
- Olen Underwood (born 1942), American football player and judge
- Paul Underwood (born 1973), English footballer
- Rory Underwood (born 1963), English rugby union player
- Tiquan Underwood (born 1987), American football wide receiver
- Tom Underwood (1953–2010), American baseball pitcher
- Tony Underwood (born 1969), English rugby union player
- Wayne Underwood (1913–1967), American football player

==== Fictional characters ====
- Frank Underwood (House of Cards), fictional American politician
- Grover Underwood, a fictional satyr
- Weevil Underwood, a Yu-Gi-Oh! character
- Braxton Bragg Underwood, the Maycomb newspaper editor in the novel To Kill a Mockingbird by Harper Lee
- Jean Underwood, a teacher in the novel Rage by Stephen King
- Robin Underwood, a character in Nexo Knights
- Mr. Underwood, a side-character in TimeSplitters 2 and TimeSplitters: Future Perfect
- Zack Underwood, main characters in Milo Murphy's Law

== See also ==
- Frank Underwood (disambiguation)
- Justice Underwood (disambiguation)
