= David Favis-Mortlock =

English geomorphologist and musician

David T. Favis-Mortlock is an English geomorphologist and musician.

Born David Mortlock on 27 August 1953, he grew up in Barking, Essex, UK, later moving to Basildon New Town, where he attended Barstable School. He studied environmental sciences at Lancaster University, graduating in 1975. After several years as a musician, he commenced a PhD study on soil erosion modeling at Brighton Polytechnic, under the supervision of geomorphologist John Boardman. Subsequently, he worked with Boardman at the University of Oxford's Environmental Change Unit (now the Environmental Change Institute).

Publications include the first quantitative study of the impact of climate change on soil erosion by water, and a novel modelling study of soil erosion in prehistory together with archaeologist Martin Bell. In 1996 he developed a self-organising systems model for rill initiation and development, RillGrow. In 2013, together with Andres Payo (British Geological Survey), he began work on CoastalME ("Coastal Modelling Environment"), which is now being used in several projects across the UK and Europe, as a planning tool in both research and engineering contexts. He is also responsible for the Soil Erosion website. Favis-Mortlock was elected a Council Member for the British Society of Soil Science, 2001–2003, and a member of the Executive Committee of the British Geomorphological Research Group, 2003-2006. Until 2010 he was a lecturer at Queen's University Belfast, Northern Ireland. He then returned to the Environmental Change Institute until 2020, and is currently a visiting researcher at the British Geological Survey.

He is married to fellow musician and painter Joanna Davies; they live near Crickadarn, Powys. His stepson Reuben Beau Davies is an actor and musician.

== Music ==
Favis-Mortlock is also a musician; in 1978 he formed a Banbury-based folk group named after the nearby Rollright Stones, together with Adderbury morris dancer, the late Bryan Sheppard. At one stage, the Rollrights included fellow fiddler Chris Leslie on bass guitar. The group supported Fairport Convention and recorded with Fairport's Dave Pegg. Subsequently, Favis-Mortlock played fiddle with guitarist Frank Underwood, and with the Brighton-based folk-punk band Tricks Upon Travellers. He now plays jazz violin with Gypsy jazz group FiddleBop, which includes Graeme Lamble, the brother of Fairport Convention's original drummer Martin Lamble, on fretless bass guitar.

== Publications ==
He has published over 50 peer-reviewed articles. The most cited have been:

- "Evaluation of field-scale and catchment-scale soil erosion models" by Jetten, V., De Roo, A., Favis-Mortlock, D. 1999 Catena 37 (3-4), pp. 521–541, cited 341 times according to Scopus
- "Emergence and erosion: a model for rill initiation and development" by Favis-Mortlock, D.T., Boardman, J., Parsons, A.J. and Lascelles, B. 2000 Hydrological Processes 14 (11-12), pp. 2173-2205, cited 154 times
- "Nonlinear responses of soil erosion to climate change: a modelling study on the UK South Downs " by Favis-Mortlock, D., Boardman, J. 1995 Catena 25 (1-4), pp. 365–387, cited 143 times.
- "A self-organizing dynamic systems approach to the simulation of rill initiation and development on hillslopes" by Favis-Mortlock, D. 1998 Computers and Geosciences 24 (4), pp. 353–372, cited 135 times

30 papers of his have been cited 30 times or more.

He also co-edited the book: Modelling Soil Erosion by Water.
