= Llanmartin =

Village and parish in Newport, Wales

Coordinates: 51.597°N 2.881°W

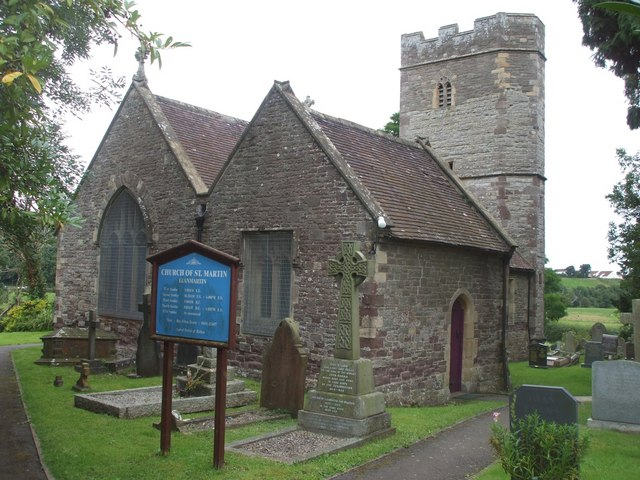
Church of St Martin

Llanmartin (Welsh: Llanfarthin) is a village and parish in the city of Newport, Wales.

== The community ==
The parish contains several communities and is centred on the parish church which is dedicated to St. Martin. The word llan means 'church' in Welsh. The Welsh name Llanfarthin contains a mutated form of Marthin, the Welsh form of Martin.

== Underwood ==
Within the parish is Underwood which has an early 1960s council housing estate that consists of houses, shops, a leisure centre, Baptist church and social club. A Westbury homes development was built in Underwood in the 1990s.

The Underwood Estate was originally developed from the former World War II Prisoner-of-war camp after the war, in the late 1940s. A few examples of the surviving former PoW huts were visible until the early 1990s, when they were demolished. The original huts stood as early community buildings. In the early 1980s several huts and a water tower were also visible on the now Waltwood Park Drive area, this area belonged to the General Post Office and was used to house old telecommunications equipment until it was sold and demolished by British Telecom who took over the site when the organisation was privatised in the early 1980s. The land was subsequently sold to Westbury homes who built the Waltwood Park Drive Development of around 220 houses on the land.

The Underwood Estate is situated in a natural land formation within the falls of a wooded area on the south and north side and a small drainage ditch or reen called "Monks Ditch" on the northern side of the development. The estate was built in three phases, with the Waltwood Park Development being the last of the three.

Many people believe that the Underwood Estate was created for the local steelworks at Llanwern, as it was constructed at the same time as the Richard Thomas and Baldwins "Spencer Works" was being built. This has some truth, as originally people moved into the huts after the war. However the local council at the time, Magor and St Mellons Rural District Council, created the housing estate with post-war initiatives for more housing, hence why the second phase of the housing development consists of rapid construction poured concrete houses which are very sturdy in construction and much stronger than traditional bricks-and-mortar houses.

== Amenities ==
The Leisure Centre was considered to be one of the best leisure centres in the area, in fact it's widely known as one of the first in Wales. It was built from funding provided by Richard Thomas and Baldwins, when the Llanwern steelworks was constructed, built on land donated to the community by local farmer Mr. Weeks and still covered by a covenant on the land by the original donor. However there are moves to change this donation to build upon the land, of which the local residents are ardently opposed to. The Leisure Centre was closed and sold in 2013 to cut costs; the following year the police discovered it was one of the largest cannabis factories in Gwent, housing an estimated 4000 plants with a value of £1.1 million.

Within the Llanmartin area, a large man-made reservoir is located. This reservoir is built on Waltwood Hill. It consists of four lagoons which contain greywater. This water was used at the Llanwern steelworks. It remains private property and is off-limits to the public.

Pencoed, with its castle, is situated nearby. A small hamlet of Llanmartin, it consists of farms and a number of houses. The Old Barn is an old barn (c. 1800) which has been converted to a local public house serving quality food and drink. Within St. Martin's Church is the great stone tomb of Sir Nicolas Morgan, the Knight of Pencoed Castle in the reign of Henry VII. The frieze carved on the tomb shows Sir Nicolas' seven sons to his right and seven daughters to his left.
