= Frank Underwood =

Frank, Franklin or Francis Underwood may refer to:

- Francis H. Underwood (1825–1894), American writer, founder of The Atlantic, and consul to Scotland
- Frank Underwood (English musician), folk and blues musician
- Frank Livingston Underwood (1844–1918), American banker and railroad developer
- Franklin Underwood, also known as Frank Underwood, American musical theater songwriter
- Frank Underwood (House of Cards), the fictional protagonist of the American television drama series House of Cards

== See also ==
- Francis (disambiguation)
- Frank (disambiguation)
- Franklin (disambiguation)
- Underwood (disambiguation)
