= Angela Smith, Baroness Smith of Basildon =

British politician and life peer (born 1959)

The Right Honourable The Baroness Smith of Basildon PC
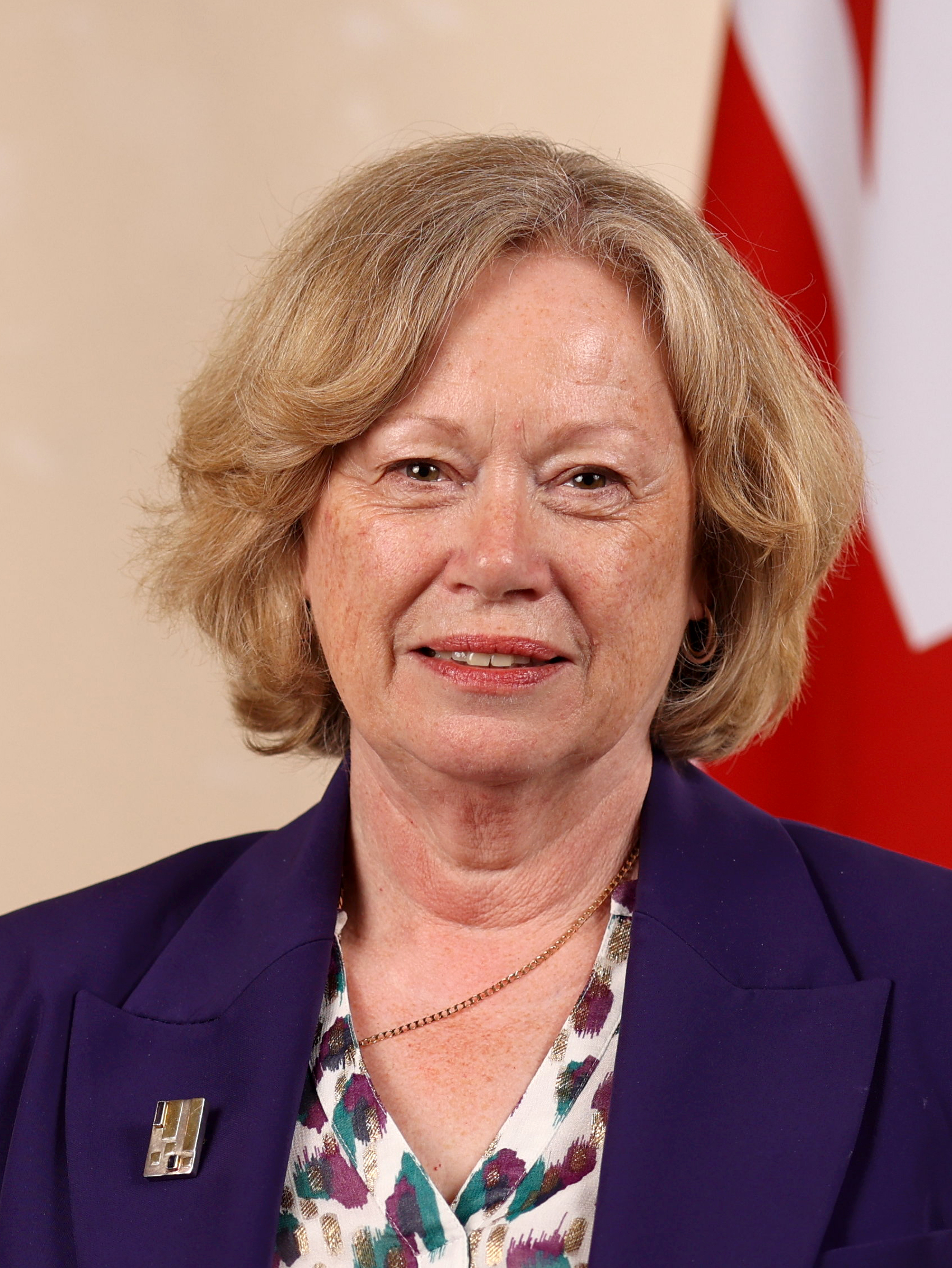
- Official portrait, 2024

Leader of the House of Lords Lord Keeper of the Privy Seal
- Incumbent
- Assumed office 5 July 2024
- Prime Minister: Keir Starmer; Andy Burnham
- Preceded by: The Lord True

Leader of the Opposition in the Lords
- In office 27 May 2015 – 5 July 2024
- Party Leader: Harriet Harman (acting); Jeremy Corbyn; Keir Starmer
- Preceded by: The Baroness Royall of Blaisdon
- Succeeded by: The Lord True

Parliamentary Private Secretary to the Prime Minister
- In office 28 June 2007 – 8 June 2009
- Prime Minister: Gordon Brown
- Preceded by: Keith Hill
- Succeeded by: Anne Snelgrove
Junior ministerial offices
Minister of State
2009–2010	Third Sector
Under-Secretary of State
2006–2007	Fire Services
2002–2006	Northern Ireland
Northern Ireland Executive
Direct rule portfolios
2005–2006	Education
2005–2006	Employment and Learning
2005–2006	Enterprise, Trade and Investment
2003–2005	Health, Social Services and Public Safety
2002–2005	Culture, Arts and Leisure
2002–2005	Environment
2002–2003	Regional Development

Member of the House of Lords
- Lord Temporal
- Life peerage 7 July 2010

Member of Parliament for Basildon
- In office 1 May 1997 – 12 April 2010
- Preceded by: David Amess
- Succeeded by: Stephen Metcalfe (Note: As Member of Parliament for South Basildon and East Thurrock.)

Personal details
- Born: Angela Evans; 7 January 1959 (age 67) London, England
- Party: Labour Co-op
- Spouse: Nigel Smith
- Education: Leicester Polytechnic (BA)

Angela Evans Smith, Baroness Smith of Basildon (born 7 January 1959), is a British politician and life peer serving as Leader of the House of Lords and Lord Keeper of the Privy Seal since 2024. A member of the Labour and Co-operative parties, she was the member of Parliament (MP) for Basildon from 1997 to 2010.

Smith served in government as an assistant whip from 2001 to 2002 and a parliamentary under-secretary of state from 2002 to 2007. She became Parliamentary Private Secretary to the Prime Minister, Gordon Brown, in 2007 and served until her appointment as Minister of State for the Third Sector in 2009.

Smith lost her seat to the Conservatives at the 2010 general election, contesting the reformed South Basildon and East Thurrock constituency. She was appointed to the House of Lords shortly after her defeat, where she became Shadow Deputy Chief Whip in 2012 and Shadow Leader in 2015.

== Early life ==
Smith was born on 7 January 1959 in London, England. She attended Pitsea Junior School and Chalvedon Comprehensive (later Chalvedon School) in Basildon, before studying public administration at Leicester Polytechnic, where she graduated with a BA degree. In 1978, she married Nigel Smith, who has written a number of history books for Key Stage 3 and Key Stage 4.

From 1982 to 1983, Smith was a trainee accountant with the London Borough of Newham. She then worked for the League Against Cruel Sports from 1983 to 1995, becoming the head of Political and Public Relations. She was a political researcher from 1995 to 1997.

Smith was a member of Essex County Council from 1989 and a member of the Fire Authority for the County of Essex.

== Parliamentary career ==
=== House of Commons ===
Having previously contested Southend West in the 1987 general election, Smith was selected to stand for election for Labour in Basildon nearly a decade later in December 1995 through an all-women shortlist. She was elected for Basildon at the 1997 general election, replacing the Conservative MP David Amess, who had moved to contest the nearby safer seat of Southend West, which Smith previously fought herself, when Basildon's boundaries were slightly redrawn. Amess's hold on the seat had always been tenuous even in Tory landslides, and he knew the new boundaries all but assured his small majority would be overturned by Labour. She was re-elected comfortably in 2001 and 2005.

In December 1997, Smith introduced the Private member's bill to minimise waste generation, and was successful in negotiating its passage through Parliament to become the Waste Minimisation Act 1998.

=== In government ===
Smith was appointed a Government Whip in 2001, before being promoted to Parliamentary under-secretary of state for Northern Ireland in October 2002. In 2006, she was moved to the Department for Communities and Local Government, with responsibility for Fire Services.

On 28 June 2007, Smith was appointed as a Parliamentary private secretary to the new prime minister Gordon Brown, entitling her to attend Cabinet. She gave up this role at the reshuffle of June 2009, to enter Government in the Cabinet Office as Minister of State for the Third Sector, when she was sworn of the Privy Council.

The old Basildon seat was abolished in the 2010 general election, and she stood for and lost the contest to the new South Basildon and East Thurrock constituency, which predominantly covered much of the area she represented in Parliament, to the Conservative candidate Stephen Metcalfe. Adverse boundary changes contributed to her defeat, as some of her voters were moved into the new Basildon and Billericay seat, whilst the new South Basildon seat took in strong Conservative wards in East Thurrock. Labour would have possibly held the old Basildon seat, and Smith herself said in a 2011 House of Lords debate: "Prior to my election to the other place in 1997, the constituency boundaries in my constituency were redrawn. For the 2010 election, the constituency boundaries were redrawn again, which may explain why I am in your Lordships' House and not in the other place".

Expenses

In June 2009 Smith had to repay over £1,000 for wrongly claimed Council Tax expenses and service charges for her second property in Elephant and Castle. A review by Sir Thomas Legg uncovered further monies over-claimed by Baroness Smith making a total of £1,429 which she later returned.

=== House of Lords ===
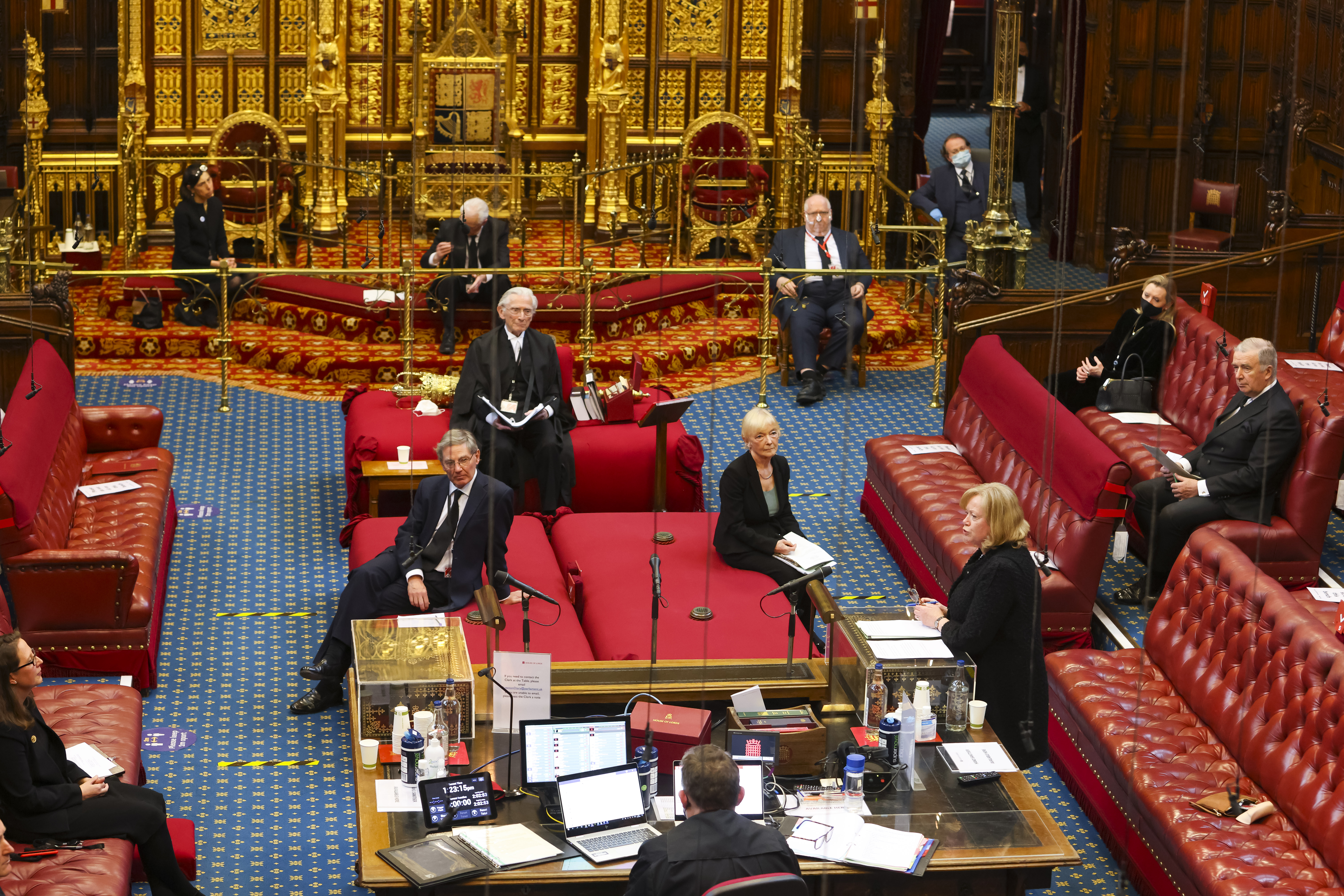
Smith at the Lords' dispatch box in 2021

Smith was created a Life Peer as Baroness Smith of Basildon, of Basildon in the County of Essex, on 7 July 2010, following the 2010 Dissolution Honours List. She was introduced into the House of Lords the next day.

In the Lords, Smith was Labour Spokeswoman for Energy and Climate Change from 2010 to 2013, Northern Ireland from 2011 to 2012 and the Home Office from 2012 to 2015. She also served as Opposition Deputy Whip in the House of Lords from 2012 to 2015. On 27 May 2015, Smith was elected unopposed as Labour's Leader in the Lords, and so joined Harriet Harman's Shadow Cabinet.

In June 2016, Smith and Lords chief whip Lord Bassam of Brighton stated they would boycott shadow cabinet meetings while Jeremy Corbyn remained leader of the Labour Party, but returned to attending shadow cabinet four months later.

In September 2017, she was named at Number 71 in 'The 100 Most Influential People on the Left' by commentator Iain Dale.

=== Shadow cabinet ===
In April 2020, Corbyn resigned and as the leadership election ensued which was later won by Keir Starmer, Smith remained as Shadow Leader of the House of Lords.

In September 2021, she made comments regarding Corbyn and the Labour Party's conference in Brighton. She stressed that Corbyn should not attempt to disrupt Starmer's efforts to reshape the party's direction. This was in light of Corbyn's planned participation in a parallel event linked to Momentum, which had supported his leadership.

Smith strongly advocated for reforming the House of Lords, aligning with Labour's broader constitutional review led by former prime minister Gordon Brown. She favoured replacing the current House with an elected chamber, acknowledging the existing system as "indefensible." However, she was pragmatic about the time and the complexities involved in immediate constitutional change. Smith emphasised that the initial years of a Labour government would likely focus on more immediate issues such as economic growth and addressing the cost of living crisis, rather than undertaking a complete overhaul of the Lords.

== Northern Ireland Executive career (2002–2006) ==
=== Appointment ===
In October 2002, Smith was selected by the Secretary of State for Northern Ireland, John Reid, to serve in a direct rule Executive following the suspension of the Northern Ireland Assembly.

=== Minister for Regional Development (2002–2003) ===
Smith considered introducing domestic water charges to fund Northern Ireland Water in June 2003 to take effect in April 2006.

=== Minister of the Environment (2002–2005) ===
In August 2003, Smith came under pressure to overturn the decision by planners to reject a proposal for Strangford Lough's first yacht marina.

Smith refused Dungannon Coursing Club a licence to net hares for their annual hare coursing meeting in October 2003, despite evidence of a scientific and conservation nature that support their application.

In November 2004, Smith paid tribute to the developer and architects of a tiny lane of four houses in Donaghadee which beat hundreds of entries from across the UK to win an elite Government award for housing design.

In February 2004, Smith met Alliance Party leader David Ford to discuss opposition to plans for an asbestos handling station in Newpark, County Antrim.

North Down MP Lady Hermon called on Smith to clean up a Groomsport beach before Easter in March 2005.

=== Minister of Culture, Arts and Leisure (2002–2005) ===
Smith gave the green light for the release of the £8 million of government money to the Irish Football Association in April 2004.

In November 2004, Smith said that the creative industries make a "significant contribution" to the economy of Northern Ireland.

In January 2005, Smith announced she would introduce legislation to end racism in Ulster football after two Larne players were targeted by terrace thugs in front of stewards patrolling the ground.

=== Minister of Health, Social Services and Public Safety (2003–2005) ===
The decade-long running Ulster 'baby wars' controversy was brought to a close in June 2003 after Smith decided a new multi-million pound regional maternity hospital should be built at the Royal Victoria Hospital. Both the Royal and the Belfast City Hospital Trust had fought over becoming the location for the unit since the early 1990s.

In July 2003, Smith spoke of her "horror" over injuries suffered by an adopted child who died three years earlier. She said she would be carefully considering a report which showed the 13-month-old child suffered 16 fractures to his ribs and torso prior to his death.

Health chiefs began a major campaign to tackle violence in homes across Northern Ireland in October 2003. Smith said the issue had to be a priority and placed on the Government's Agenda for Change.

In June 2004, Smith condemned violence at the Mater Infirmorum Hospital in Belfast following an Orange Order parade.

In September 2004, Smith warned that a lack of exercise and a poor diet has led to thousands of years of life being lost in Northern Ireland as the deadline approached for the end of the Department of Health's consultation on a new Physical Activity Strategy and Action Plan.

Smith established a Hyponatraemia Inquiry in 2004.

=== Minister for Enterprise, Trade and Investment (2005–2006) ===
In August 2005, East Surrey Holdings called on Smith to take urgent action to prevent regulatory interference scuppering a stalled £453 million takeover of East Surrey, parent company of Phoenix Natural Gas.

=== Minister for Employment and Learning (2005–2006) ===
Smith told a conference in Belfast that the creative industries provide 9,000 jobs. She said that "I believe that creativity is central to all aspects of work..."

=== Minister of Education (2005–2006) ===
Smith met a delegation from Loughbrickland Controlled Primary School to discuss the school's future in July 2005. Local MP David Simpson was "fighting" for the school to be retained.

In October 2005, Smith denied misleading the public by misquoting a quotation from National Statistician Len Cook when responding to a letter from a grammar school principal which criticised the factual information used by civil servants in the Department of Education.

Smith was criticised by the Democratic Unionist Party (DUP) for supporting the retention of academic selection for schools in England in a vote on 17 March 2006, while insisting it is scrapped in Northern Ireland.

== Leader of the House of Lords (2024–present) ==
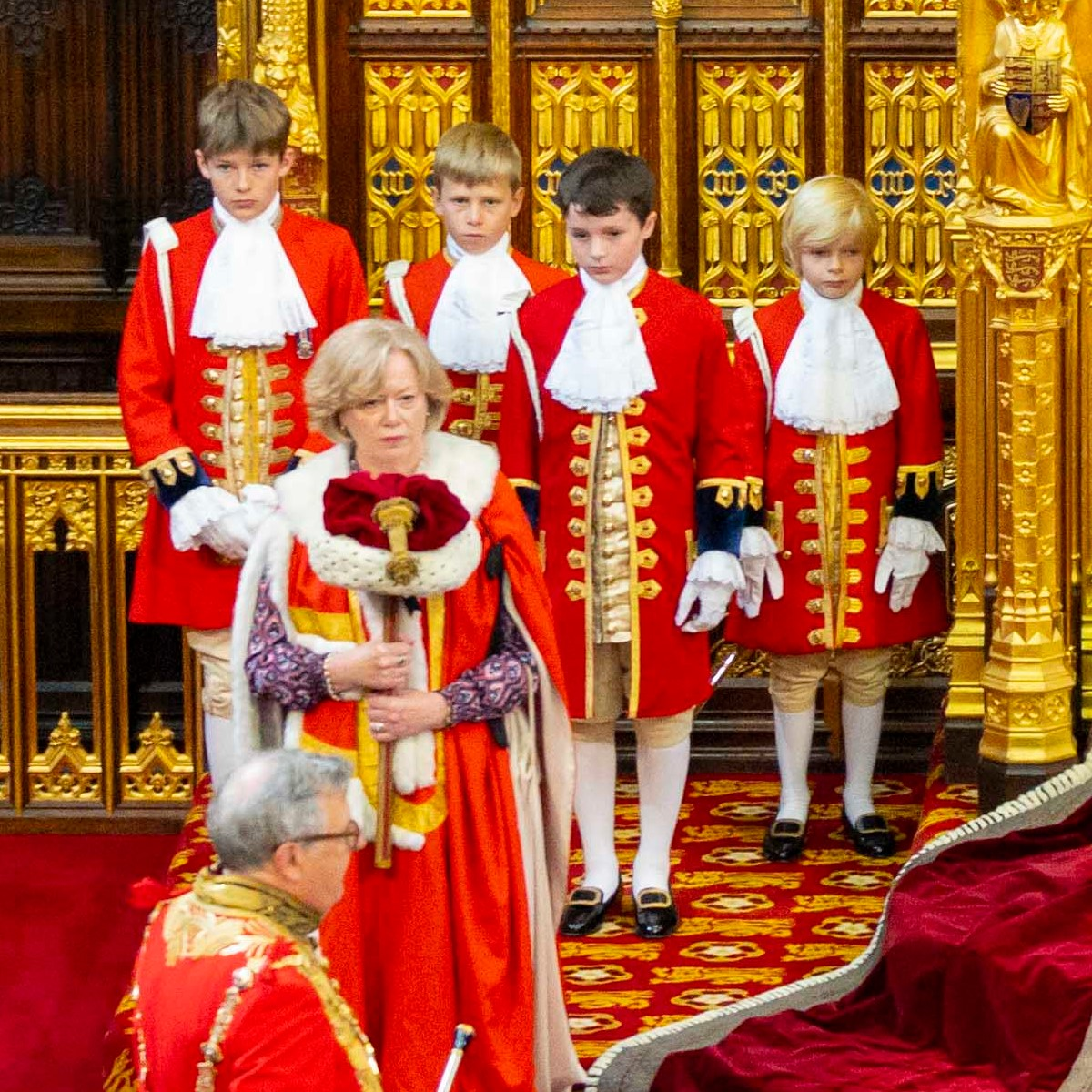
Smith holding the Cap of Maintenance at the 2024 King's Speech.

Following the Labour Party's landslide victory in the 2024 general election, Baroness Smith of Basildon was appointed as Leader of the House of Lords and Lord Privy Seal by Prime Minister Keir Starmer on 5 July.

== Political positions ==
An active supporter of animal welfare, Smith is a patron of Freedom for Animals, a charity campaigning for an end to the use of animals in circuses, zoos and the exotic pet trade.

== Notes ==
Parliament of the United Kingdom
Preceded by David Amess	Member of Parliament for Basildon; 1997–2010	Succeeded by Stephen Metcalfe as MP for South Basildon and East Thurrock
Party political offices
Preceded by The Baroness Royall of Blaisdon	Leader of the Labour Party in the House of Lords; 2015–present	Incumbent
Political offices
Preceded by The Baroness Royall of Blaisdon	Shadow Leader of the House of Lords; 2015–2024	Succeeded by The Baron True
Preceded by The Baron True	Leader of the House of Lords; 2024–present	Incumbent
Preceded by The Baron True	Lord Privy Seal; 2024–present	Incumbent
Orders of precedence in the United Kingdom
Preceded by The Baroness Carr of Walton-on-the-Hill as Lady Chief Justice of England and Wales	Ladies as Lord Keeper of the Privy Seal	Followed by Ambassadors and High Commissioners to the United Kingdom
