= James Underwood =

James Underwood may refer to:

- James Underwood (pathologist) (born 1942), British pathologist
- James Underwood (businessman) (1771–1844), shipwright, businessman and distiller in Australia
- James H. Underwood (1873–1950), American farmer and politician from New York
- Jim Underwood (professor), professor of management
- Jim Underwood (politician) (1946–2013), Guamanian politician
