= Basildon Academies =

The Basildon Academies
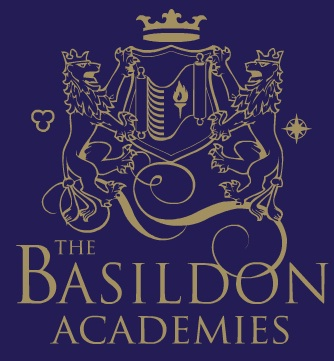
- Basildon, Essex; England

Information
- Type: Academy
- Motto: Aspire-Believe-Achieve
- Established: 2009
- Local authority: Essex
- Department for Education URN: 115316 Tables
- Ofsted: Reports
- Headteacher: Rebecca Rees
- Staff: ~300
- Gender: Mixed
- Age: 11 to 19
- Enrolment: ~2500
- Website: www.basildonacademies.org.uk

The Basildon Academies is a secondary school in Basildon, Essex, England. It was created by a merger of the former Barstable School and Chalvedon School in 2009.

== The Academies ==
The Academies are situated across two sites: the Lower Academy (for 11 to 14-year-olds) and the Upper Academy (for 14 to 19-year-olds). There is a Sixth Form on the Upper Academy site. The Academies opened in 2009, under the sponsorship of The Stanton Lane Educational Trust. Both Academies are housed in modern buildings.

== Curriculum and exam results ==
Since 2012, The Basildon Academies curriculum has been expanded to cater for a wider range of interests and competences. This includes the introduction of Latin, along with a number of vocational courses at both GCSE and A Level. In 2012, Basildon Academies received a warning letter from Lord Hill at the Department for Education because of the "unacceptably low" standards. The Upper Academy's GCSE results for 2013 continued a four-year trend of improvement, with the proportion of students achieving 5 or more A*-C grades (including English and Maths) rising to 46%, demonstrating an increase of 25 percentage points since 2009. This confirmed the Academies as the second best-performing school in Basildon at that point in time.

In 2012 there was an increase in demand for Sixth Form places. A Level results in 2013 also showed improvement on the previous year: the percentage of students gaining 3 or more A Levels (including equivalent BTEC qualifications), with all students securing 3 or more A Levels being offered a place at their first-choice university. In 2015 A level results showed that the 35 A level students obtained an average of a D grade.

== Ofsted ==
In November 2015, both the Lower and Upper Academies were inspected by Ofsted. Recognising the improvements made since the previous visits, inspectors rated both Academies 'Good' for leadership and management and behaviour and safety of students, and removed both Lower and Upper from special measures. They noted that achievement has shown continued progression, with ambitious targets ensuring that these improvements will be sustained over the coming years.

== Sixth Form ==
The Sixth Form is on the Upper Academy site, and provides both academic and vocational qualifications to students.
