= Chalvedon School =

Former specialist technology college in Essex, England

Location
- Wickford Avenue; Pitsea, Essex, SS13 3HL; England; 51°34′06″N 0°30′17″E

Information
- Type: Comprehensive
- Established: 1965
- Closed: 2009
- Local authority: Essex
- Specialist: Technology College
- Department for Education URN: 115316 Tables
- Ofsted: Reports
- Headteacher: Alan Roach
- Gender: Coeducational
- Age: 11 to 18
- Enrolment: 1881
- Website: https://web.archive.org/web/20061205060823/http://chalvedon.com/

Chalvedon School and 6th Form College was a Specialist Technology College in Pitsea, Essex, England. It was a comprehensive school educating pupils aged between 11 and 18 years of age. Chalvedon had over 1800 pupils on roll including 196 sixth formers.

The school was first opened in 1966 and operated on the same site until its formal closure.

In January 2006 Chalvedon School federated with another local comprehensive school, Barstable School, to form The Federation of Chalvedon School and Sixth Form College and Barstable School. In 2009 the school formally closed with pupils transferring to the newly created Basildon Academies, who use the former site for the Upper Academy.

== Notable alumni ==
- Angela Smith, MP for Basildon
- Scott Robinson, singer of the boy band Five
- James Tomkins, West Ham Utd footballer
- James Lawson, former Southend Utd footballer
- QBoy, Music Artist
- Denise Van Outen, actress, singer, dancer and presenter
- Terry Marsh, known as “The Fighting Fireman,” is a former British boxer who held the IBF light-welterweight title and retired undefeated as world champion.
