= Windsong (band) =

Windsong were a British folk-rock band of the 1970s, known as one of the groups in which Annie Lennox was involved before becoming famous with The Tourists and Eurythmics.

The group was founded by Frank Underwood in London in the early 1970s, and received much press exposure at that time. Gigs in the early days consisted mainly of wine bars and festivals. Personnel varied during the two years, with Lennox involved during 1975 as singer and flute player. A number of tracks were recorded at Chalk Farm Studios at this time, remembers Alida Hazelgrove who was a member of the band during its early period (tambourine and triangle).

== Discography ==
Although the band toured and performed widely, only one EP entitled A Sampler seems eventually to have been released in July 1978 on the Tank record label, incorporating the songs:

- "What Colour is the Wind" (Underwood)
- "Summer Come Along" (Underwood)
- "Highway Song" (Underwood)
- "My Baby Keeps Staying Out All Night Long" (trad arr. Ralph McTell)

== Personnel ==
The line-up on the recording appears to encompass the following people:

- Frank Underwood (guitar, harmonica, vocals)
- Helene Winsor (violin)
- Paul Crew (keyboards, flute, oboe, cor anglais)
- Larry Barton (cello)
- Ian Anderson (bass)
- Alida Hazelgrove (tambourine, triangle)

While Lennox certainly appeared on demos and private recordings of the band, it would seem from the sleeve listing that her involvement had ceased by the time of this public release.

=== Further line-ups ===
August 1978—Frank Underwood, Kristine Anderson, Helene Winsor, Paul Crew, Larry Barton and Lenny Clarke.

September 1978—Frank Underwood, Beverley Manning, Helene Winsor, Paul Crew, Lenny Clarke, Mike Haynes.
