= Barstable School =

School in Basildon, Essex, England

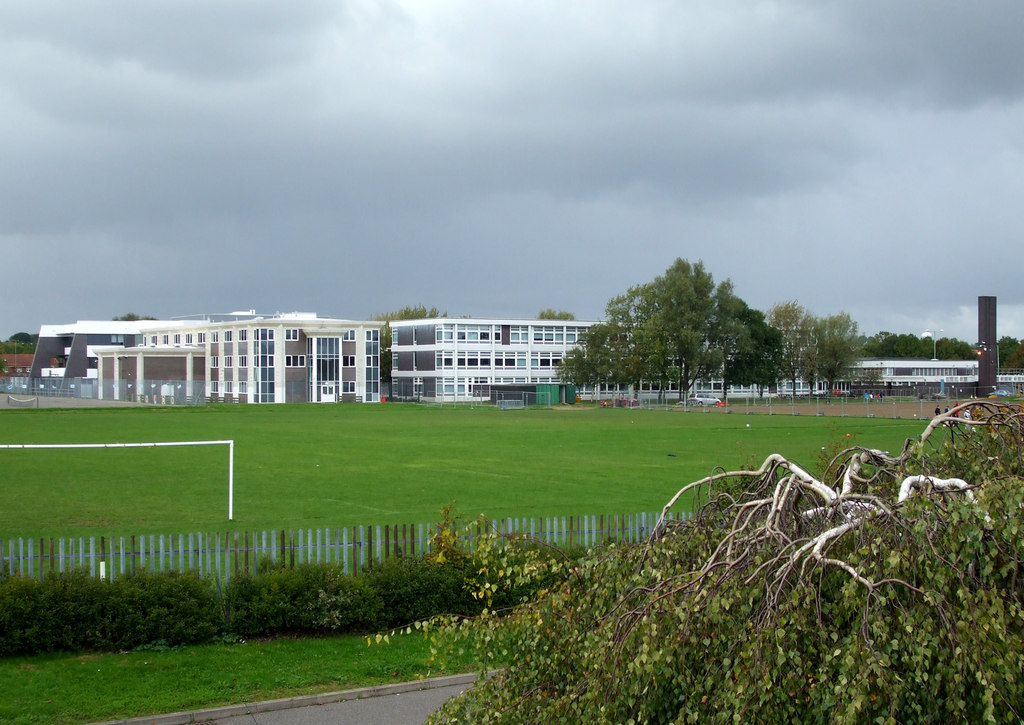

Location
- 51°34′23″N 0°29′22″E

Information
- Type: Foundation school
- Motto: Raising Standards
- Established: 1968
- Closed: 2009
- Local authority: Essex
- Department for Education URN: 115372 Tables
- Ofsted: Reports
- Headteacher: A. W Robinson
- Gender: Coeducational
- Age: 11 to 16
- Enrolment: 421
- Colour: Green/Red
- Former name: Barstable Grammar and Technical School
- Fate: Became an Academy in 2009
- Website: http://www.barstable-chalvedon.com

The Barstable School was a mixed intake secondary school in Basildon, Essex. It closed in 2009 to become a founding member of the Basildon Academies.

== Admissions ==
The school was for students aged 11–16 (school years 7–11). The headteacher was Alan Roach. The school received the Sportsmark designation and is part of Creative Partnerships.

The school was on the south side of the A1321, west of the A132 roundabout, around one mile directly east of Basildon town centre. The part of Basildon known as Barstable is named after the former Barstable Hall.

== History ==
=== Grammar school ===
The Barstable School building first opened on 1 March 1962 as the Barstable Grammar and Technical School, a grammar technical school. The grammar school was designed by the Finnish-British architect Cyril Sjöström Mardall (of YRM Architects, Yorke, Rosenberg and Mardall).

The school started before the building existed. Students were housed temporarily in Woodlands Boys School from September 1958 and in Woodlands Girls School in September 1959. The boys and girls were joined as mixed classes after the February half term in 1962.

=== Comprehensive ===
In 1968, the Grammar and Technical School under the Headmaster G G Whitehead merged with the Timberlog County Secondary School. When the two schools merged into one school, it took the name of Barstable School. Timberlog Secondary School became a housing estate in the 1990s, following a time as the site of the Lower School.

In April 1990, two young brothers Christopher, eight, and Asa, nine, were pulled unconscious from a burning storage shed on the grounds of the School. The boys and their friend Mark Kirby did not survive the incident.

On 30 March 1993 the building became a Grade II listed building. Around this time, the school was grant-maintained.

In 2006, David Cameron visited the school. The school suffered from very low, and unacceptable, exam results. In 2006, the school along with Chalvedon School federated under the title of The Federation of Chalvedon School and Sixth Form College and Barstable School, though formally kept their operating names.

When it closed, over 20% of its pupils were receiving free school meals. Its successful future as a school was not even helped by the fact that from 2008–9 it was receiving £5,137 per pupil, one of the highest in Essex, which had an average of £4,066 per pupil.

In 2009 the school formally closed with pupils transferring to the newly created Basildon Academies.

=== Academy ===
In September 2009 it became The Basildon Lower Academy, for ages 11–14. Chalvedon School became The Basildon Upper Academy. On development of the Academy, pupil numbers changed from around 400 to around 950.

== Blocks ==
Barstable School had five blocks - A Block, B Block, L Block, S Block and T Block. The building was listed in 1993 and is Grade II listed.

== Academic performance ==
In the 1990s, around 20% were gaining five good GCSEs.

In 2005 when 10% of those taking GCSEs gained 5 good grades, including Maths and English, this was the 34th lowest result in England, and the lowest in Essex LEA (one in nearby Thurrock LEA was lower - former Essex). In 2003 it was 11th lowest in England.

== Alumni ==
=== Barstable Grammar and Technical School ===
- Tony Parsons, arts journalist
- Stuart Bingham, professional snooker player
- Dave Gahan, singer with Depeche Mode
- Glenn Keeley, professional footballer
- Dave Favis-Mortlock, geomorphologist and jazz violinist
- Simon Swordy, former director of the Enrico Fermi Institute Chicago and Professor of Physics, Astronomy and Astrophysics, University of Chicago
