= Judge Underwood =

Judge Underwood may refer to:

- Emory Marvin Underwood (1877–1960), judge of the United States District Court for the Northern District of Georgia
- John Curtiss Underwood (1809–1873), judge of the United States District Courts for the District of Virginia and the Eastern District of Virginia
- Mell G. Underwood (1892–1972), judge of the United States District Court for the Southern District of Ohio

== See also ==
- Justice Underwood (disambiguation)
