= Rowanfield =

Suburb of Cheltenham, Gloucestershire, England

Coordinates: 51°54′10″N 2°6′10″W

Rowanfield is a neighbourhood in Cheltenham, England. It consists primarily of a social housing estate of Wimpey no-fines houses and low-rise flats, built around 1953, with Rowanfield School and a playing field to the West separating it from Hesters Way and also the older Rowanfield Road to the East. To the southwest, Rowanfield borders the district of St Mark's. Rowanfield is located 1.5 miles west of the centre of Cheltenham.

== History ==
Until the Second World War, the area between Brooklyn Road and Rowanfield Road was an orchard primarily producing cider apples. All the names of the avenues were named after the counties of England (except Cambridge Avenue and Bedford Avenue, presumably since Cambridgeshire and Bedfordshire were considered too long). There is a grass square on Norfolk Avenue (at times known as Norfolk Square or the nickname of “the green”) in the middle of the estate, where the council put up swings and a roundabout. These were taken away sometime in the 1950s after complaints of misuse late at night. Cheltenham's King George the Fifth playing field is set to the west of the estate. The road layout has a geometric style typical of planned social housing.

== Facilities ==
Rowanfield has a small collection of local shops known as Rowanfield Exchange, located near the northern end of Devon Avenue. It includes a fish and chip shop, newsagent, laundrette and bookmaker. The pub opposite (at the time Cotterills Bar, named after the manager of Cheltenham Town Football Club and boldly decorated in the club's colours, previously The Golden Miller) was demolished in 2004, and it is currently small flats.

== Political ==
Rowanfield falls within the Cheltenham parliamentary constituency and the local council ward of Rowanfield and St Marks. Prior to Brexit in 2020, it was in the South West England European Parliament constituency.

== Other information ==
Around half of the houses in Rowanfield are owner-occupied as of 2006; the remainder are owned by the local authority, Cheltenham Borough Council. Council-owned no-fines houses benefitted from the installation of clearly visible external insulation panelling and improved ventilation to address perceived disadvantages of the no-fines construction.
