= List of United Kingdom locations: U-Uppen =

The United Kingdom

This is part of the list of United Kingdom locations: a gazetteer of place names in the United Kingdom showing each place's locality and geographical coordinates.

== Ua ==
| Location | Locality | Coordinates (links to map & photo sources) | OS grid reference |
|---|---|---|---|
| Uachdar | Western Isles | 57.47°N 07.34°W | NF8055 |

== Ub ==
| Location | Locality | Coordinates (links to map & photo sources) | OS grid reference |
|---|---|---|---|
| Ubberley | City of Stoke-on-Trent | 53.01°N 02.13°W | SJ9146 |
| Ubley | Bath and North East Somerset | 51.31°N 02.69°W | ST5258 |

== Uc ==
| Location | Locality | Coordinates (links to map & photo sources) | OS grid reference |
|---|---|---|---|
| Uckerby | North Yorkshire | 54.41°N 01.63°W | NZ2402 |
| Uckfield | East Sussex | 50.96°N 00.09°E | TQ4721 |
| Uckinghall | Worcestershire | 52.04°N 02.20°W | SO8638 |
| Uckington | Gloucestershire | 51.91°N 02.13°W | SO9124 |
| Uckington | Shropshire | 52.67°N 02.63°W | SJ5709 |

== Ud ==
| Location | Locality | Coordinates (links to map & photo sources) | OS grid reference |
|---|---|---|---|
| Uddingston | South Lanarkshire | 55.81°N 04.09°W | NS6960 |
| Udimore | East Sussex | 50.93°N 00.64°E | TQ8618 |
| Udley | North Somerset | 51.36°N 02.77°W | ST4663 |
| Udny Green | Aberdeenshire | 57.32°N 02.20°W | NJ8826 |
| Udny Station | Aberdeenshire | 57.30°N 02.16°W | NJ9024 |
| Udston | South Lanarkshire | 55.77°N 04.08°W | NS6955 |
| Udstonhead | South Lanarkshire | 55.69°N 04.06°W | NS7046 |

== Uf ==
| Location | Locality | Coordinates (links to map & photo sources) | OS grid reference |
|---|---|---|---|
| Uffcott | Wiltshire | 51.49°N 01.82°W | SU1277 |
| Uffculme | Devon | 50.89°N 03.33°W | ST0612 |
| Uffington | Oxfordshire | 51.59°N 01.56°W | SU3089 |
| Uffington | Lincolnshire | 52.65°N 00.43°W | TF0607 |
| Uffington | Shropshire | 52.71°N 02.71°W | SJ5213 |
| Ufford | Suffolk | 52.11°N 01.34°E | TM2952 |
| Ufford | Cambridgeshire | 52.62°N 00.39°W | TF0904 |
| Ufton | Warwickshire | 52.25°N 01.45°W | SP3762 |
| Ufton Green | Berkshire | 51.40°N 01.10°W | SU6268 |
| Ufton Nervet | Berkshire | 51.39°N 01.09°W | SU6367 |

== Ug ==
| Location | Locality | Coordinates (links to map & photo sources) | OS grid reference |
|---|---|---|---|
| Ugborough | Devon | 50.37°N 03.87°W | SX6755 |
| Ugford | Wiltshire | 51.07°N 01.88°W | SU0831 |
| Uggeshall | Suffolk | 52.36°N 01.58°E | TM4480 |
| Ugglebarnby | North Yorkshire | 54.45°N 00.64°W | NZ8807 |
| Ughill | Sheffield | 53.40°N 01.62°W | SK2590 |
| Ugley | Essex | 51.93°N 00.20°E | TL5228 |
| Ugley Green | Essex | 51.92°N 00.20°E | TL5227 |
| Ugthorpe | North Yorkshire | 54.48°N 00.78°W | NZ7911 |

== Ui ==
| Location | Locality | Coordinates (links to map & photo sources) | OS grid reference |
|---|---|---|---|
| Uidh | Western Isles | 56.92°N 07.50°W | NL6595 |
| Uig (Snizort) | Highland | 57.58°N 06.36°W | NG3963 |
| Uig (Duirinish) | Highland | 57.47°N 06.68°W | NG1952 |
| Uig | Argyll and Bute | 56.59°N 06.62°W | NM1654 |
| Uigen | Western Isles | 58.19°N 06.95°W | NB0934 |
| Uigshader | Highland | 57.43°N 06.30°W | NG4246 |
| Uinessan | Western Isles | 56.93°N 07.47°W | NL671957 |
| Uisken | Argyll and Bute | 56.29°N 06.23°W | NM3819 |

== Ul ==
| Location | Locality | Coordinates (links to map & photo sources) | OS grid reference |
|---|---|---|---|
| Ulbster | Highland | 58.34°N 03.16°W | ND3240 |
| Ulcat Row | Cumbria | 54.59°N 02.93°W | NY4022 |
| Ulceby | North Lincolnshire | 53.61°N 00.33°W | TA1014 |
| Ulceby | Lincolnshire | 53.22°N 00.12°E | TF4272 |
| Ulceby Skitter | North Lincolnshire | 53.61°N 00.30°W | TA1215 |
| Ulcombe | Kent | 51.21°N 00.63°E | TQ8449 |
| Uldale | Cumbria | 54.71°N 03.18°W | NY2436 |
| Uley | Gloucestershire | 51.68°N 02.31°W | ST7898 |
| Ulgham | Northumberland | 55.22°N 01.63°W | NZ2392 |
| Ullapool | Highland | 57.89°N 05.17°W | NH1294 |
| Ullcombe | Devon | 50.87°N 03.12°W | ST2109 |
| Ullenhall | Warwickshire | 52.30°N 01.82°W | SP1267 |
| Ulleskelf | North Yorkshire | 53.84°N 01.22°W | SE5139 |
| Ullesthorpe | Leicestershire | 52.47°N 01.26°W | SP5087 |
| Ulley | Rotherham | 53.37°N 01.30°W | SK4687 |
| Ullingswick | Herefordshire | 52.13°N 02.60°W | SO5949 |
| Ullington | Worcestershire | 52.12°N 01.85°W | SP1047 |
| Ullinish | Highland | 57.35°N 06.45°W | NG3238 |
| Ullock (Above Derwent) | Cumbria | 54.59°N 03.17°W | NY2423 |
| Ullock (Dean) | Cumbria | 54.59°N 03.44°W | NY0723 |
| Ulpha | Cumbria | 54.32°N 03.24°W | SD1993 |
| Ulrome | East Riding of Yorkshire | 53.98°N 00.23°W | TA1656 |
| Ulshaw | North Yorkshire | 54.27°N 01.78°W | SE1487 |
| Ulsta | Shetland Islands | 60.50°N 01.16°W | HU4680 |
| Ulting | Essex | 51.75°N 00.61°E | TL8008 |
| Ulva | Argyll and Bute | 56.47°N 06.21°W | NM404398 |
| Ulverley Green | Solihull | 52.42°N 01.81°W | SP1381 |
| Ulverston | Cumbria | 54.19°N 03.10°W | SD2878 |
| Ulwell | Dorset | 50.61°N 01.97°W | SZ0280 |

== Um ==
| Location | Locality | Coordinates (links to map & photo sources) | OS grid reference |
|---|---|---|---|
| Umberleigh | Devon | 50.98°N 03.99°W | SS6023 |
| Umborne | Devon | 50.76°N 03.09°W | SY2397 |

== Un ==
| Location | Locality | Coordinates (links to map & photo sources) | OS grid reference |
|---|---|---|---|
| Unapool | Highland | 58.24°N 05.01°W | NC2332 |
| Uncleby | East Riding of Yorkshire | 54.02°N 00.76°W | SE811591 |
| Under Bank | Kirklees | 53.55°N 01.79°W | SE1407 |
| Underbarrow | Cumbria | 54.32°N 02.83°W | SD4692 |
| Undercliffe | Bradford | 53.80°N 01.74°W | SE1734 |
| Underdale | Shropshire | 52.71°N 02.74°W | SJ5013 |
| Underdown | Devon | 50.65°N 03.58°W | SX8885 |
| Underhill | Wiltshire | 51.06°N 02.18°W | ST8730 |
| Underhill | Barnet | 51.64°N 00.19°W | TQ2595 |
| Underhoull | Shetland Islands | 60.71°N 00.95°W | HP5704 |
| Underling Green | Kent | 51.18°N 00.50°E | TQ7546 |
| Underriver | Kent | 51.24°N 00.21°E | TQ5552 |
| Underriver Ho | Kent | 51.24°N 00.23°E | TQ5652 |
| Under the Wood | Kent | 51.34°N 01.18°E | TR2266 |
| Under Tofts | Sheffield | 53.37°N 01.55°W | SK3087 |
| Underton | Shropshire | 52.52°N 02.47°W | SO6892 |
| Underwood | Devon | 50.37°N 04.06°W | SX5355 |
| Underwood | Pembrokeshire | 51.76°N 04.92°W | SM9811 |
| Underwood | City of Newport | 51.58°N 02.89°W | ST3888 |
| Underwood | Nottinghamshire | 53.04°N 01.30°W | SK4750 |
| Undley | Suffolk | 52.40°N 00.48°E | TL6981 |
| Undy | Monmouthshire | 51.57°N 02.82°W | ST4386 |
| Unifirth | Shetland Islands | 60.28°N 01.49°W | HU2856 |
| Union Mills | Isle of Man | 54.16°N 04.52°W | SC3577 |
| Union Street | East Sussex | 51.05°N 00.42°E | TQ7031 |
| United Downs | Cornwall | 50.22°N 05.17°W | SW7441 |
| Unst | Shetland Islands | 60.74°N 00.88°W | HP607073 |
| Unstone | Derbyshire | 53.28°N 01.44°W | SK3777 |
| Unstone Green | Derbyshire | 53.28°N 01.44°W | SK3776 |
| Unsworth | Bury | 53.55°N 02.28°W | SD8107 |
| Unthank (Dalston) | Cumbria | 54.82°N 02.95°W | NY3948 |
| Unthank (Skelton) | Cumbria | 54.71°N 02.85°W | NY4536 |
| Unthank (Glassonby) | Cumbria | 54.75°N 02.62°W | NY6040 |
| Unthank | Derbyshire | 53.28°N 01.55°W | SK3076 |

== Up ==
=== Upa-Uppen ===
| Location | Locality | Coordinates (links to map & photo sources) | OS grid reference |
|---|---|---|---|
| Upavon | Wiltshire | 51.29°N 01.81°W | SU1355 |
| Up Cerne | Dorset | 50.81°N 02.49°W | ST6502 |
| Upchurch | Kent | 51.37°N 00.64°E | TQ8467 |
| Upcott | Cornwall | 50.92°N 04.50°W | SS2417 |
| Upcott (Braunton) | Devon | 51.13°N 04.17°W | SS4839 |
| Upcott (Dowland) | Devon | 50.86°N 04.03°W | SS5709 |
| Upcott (Wembworthy) | Devon | 50.86°N 03.91°W | SS6509 |
| Upcott | Herefordshire | 52.14°N 02.99°W | SO3250 |
| Upcott | Somerset | 51.00°N 03.15°W | ST1924 |
| Upend | Cambridgeshire | 52.19°N 00.47°E | TL6958 |
| Up End | Milton Keynes | 52.09°N 00.65°W | SP9245 |
| Up Exe | Devon | 50.80°N 03.50°W | SS9402 |
| Upgate | Norfolk | 52.71°N 01.16°E | TG1418 |
| Upgate Street (Bedingham) | Norfolk | 52.46°N 01.35°E | TM2891 |
| Upgate Street (Carleton Rode) | Norfolk | 52.48°N 01.07°E | TM0992 |
| Up Green | Hampshire | 51.33°N 00.86°W | SU7960 |
| Uphall | Dorset | 50.81°N 02.64°W | ST5502 |
| Uphall | West Lothian | 55.92°N 03.52°W | NT0571 |
| Uphall Station | West Lothian | 55.91°N 03.50°W | NT0670 |
| Upham | Hampshire | 50.97°N 01.24°W | SU5320 |
| Upham | Devon | 50.86°N 03.59°W | SS8808 |
| Uphampton | Herefordshire | 52.26°N 02.89°W | SO3963 |
| Uphampton | Worcestershire | 52.27°N 02.25°W | SO8364 |
| Up Hatherley | Gloucestershire | 51.87°N 02.13°W | SO9120 |
| Uphempston | Devon | 50.45°N 03.66°W | SX8263 |
| Uphill | Somerset | 51.31°N 02.99°W | ST3158 |
| Uphill Manor | North Somerset | 51.32°N 02.97°W | ST3259 |
| Up Holland | Lancashire | 53.53°N 02.74°W | SD5105 |
| Uplands | Gloucestershire | 51.74°N 02.21°W | SO8505 |
| Uplands | Swansea | 51.61°N 03.98°W | SS6392 |
| Uplawmoor | East Renfrewshire | 55.76°N 04.50°W | NS4355 |
| Upleadon | Gloucestershire | 51.93°N 02.36°W | SO7526 |
| Upleadon Court | Gloucestershire | 51.93°N 02.35°W | SO7626 |
| Upleatham | Redcar and Cleveland | 54.56°N 01.02°W | NZ6319 |
| Uploders | Dorset | 50.73°N 02.70°W | SY5093 |
| Uplowman | Devon | 50.92°N 03.41°W | ST0115 |
| Uplyme | Devon | 50.73°N 02.96°W | SY3293 |
| Up Marden | West Sussex | 50.92°N 00.87°W | SU7914 |
| Upminster | Havering | 51.56°N 00.24°E | TQ5687 |
| Up Mudford | Somerset | 50.95°N 02.61°W | ST5718 |
| Up Nately | Hampshire | 51.25°N 01.01°W | SU6951 |
| Upottery | Devon | 50.85°N 03.13°W | ST2007 |
| Uppacott | Devon | 51.03°N 04.06°W | SS5528 |
| Uppat | Highland | 57.99°N 03.93°W | NC8602 |
| Uppend | Hertfordshire | 51.91°N 00.12°E | TL4626 |
