= Simon Swordy =

- Born: March 31, 1954; Birmingham, UK
- Died: July 19, 2010 (aged 56); Chicago, USA
- Occupation: Astrophysicist

Simon Patrick Swordy (March 31, 1954 – July 19, 2010) was an English-born American astrophysicist.

== Biography ==
Swordy was born in Birmingham in 1954. Both his parents were teachers. His siblings included three brothers and one sister. Swordy was educated at St Philip's School and Barstable School. He studied under Peter Fowler at the University of Bristol, and graduated in 1978.

Swordy moved to the United States in 1979 and accepted a research associate position at the Enrico Fermi Institute. In 1986, he began teaching at the University of Chicago. Swordy became a full professor in 1997. Between 2000 and 2003, Swordy was Master of the Physical Sciences Collegiate Division and associate dean of the physical sciences. In 2001, he was elected a fellow of the American Physical Society, "[f]or innovative measurements with detectors on the ground, on balloons, and in space that significantly advanced the understanding of the sources and galactic propagation of cosmic rays at high energies." In 2007, he returned to the Enrico Fermi Institute as director.

At the time of his death, Swordy was the James Franck Professor of Physics, Astronomy and Astrophysics at the University of Chicago. He died of lymphoma at the University of Chicago Medical Center on 19 July 2010, aged 56.

== Personal life ==
Swordy married Josephine Ryan in 1984, with whom he raised three children.
