= Underwood, Newport =

Area of Newport in Wales

Coordinates: 51.5958°N 2.8899°W

Underwood: Welsh: Iscoed
- Location within Wales
- Population: 1,976
- Community: Bishton
- Principal area: Newport
- Country: Wales
- Sovereign state: United Kingdom
- Post town: NEWPORT
- Postcode district: NP18
- Dialling code: 01633; Llanwern and Penhow exchanges
- Ambulance: Welsh
- UK Parliament: Newport East

Underwood is a settlement in the city of Newport, South East Wales. It is an early 1960s council housing estate that consists of houses, shops, a leisure centre, Baptist church and social club called "Iscoed Tafarn" owned by the company Red Dragon Pubs. There is a community centre which has a gym attached to it. The leisure centre is now up for sale.

== Post-War development ==
The Underwood Estate was originally developed from the former World War II Prisoner of War camp after the end of the war. A few surviving examples of the former PoW huts were still visible until the early 1990s, when they were demolished. The original huts stood as early community buildings. In the early 1980s several huts and a water tower were also visible on the now Waltwood Park Drive area. This area belonged to the General Post Office and was used to house old telecommunications equipment until it was sold and demolished by British Telecom who took over the site when BT was privatised in the early 1980s. The land was subsequently sold to Westbury homes who built the Waltwood Park Drive Development of around 220 houses on the land.

The estate is situated in a natural land formation within the falls of a wooded area on the south and north side and a small drainage ditch or reen called "Monks Ditch" on the northern side of the development. It was built in three phases, with the Waltwood Park Development being the last of the three.

Many people believe that the Underwood Estate was created for the local steelworks at Llanwern, as it was constructed at the same time as the Richard Thomas and Baldwins "Spencer Works" was being built. This has some truth, as originally people moved into the huts after the war. However the local council at the time, Magor and St Mellons Rural District Council, created the housing estate with post-war initiatives for more housing, hence why the second phase of the housing development consists of rapid construction poured concrete houses which are very sturdy in construction and much stronger than traditional bricks-and-mortar houses.

== Amenities ==
The Leisure Centre was considered to be one of the best leisure centres in the area, even though it has no swimming pool. In fact it was widely known as one of the first in Wales. It was built from funding provided by Richard Thomas and Baldwins, when the steelworks was constructed, built on land donated to the community by local farmer, Mr. Weeks, and still covered by a covenant on the land by the original donor. However, there are moves to change this donation to build upon the land, of which the local residents are ardently opposed to.

Within the Llanmartin area, on Waltwood Hill, is a large man-made reservoir. It consists of four lagoons which contain grey water. This water is used at the Llanwern steelworks. The reservoir remains private property and is off-limits to the public.

Pencoed Castle is also situated nearby. A small hamlet of Llanmartin consists of farms and a number of houses — the Old Barn Llanmartin is a circa 1800 barn converted to a public house. Within St. Martin's church is a tomb of the ancestors from Pencoed Castle.
