= Martin Bell (archaeologist) =

British archaeologist

Martin Bell FBA is a British archaeologist and academic, who is Professor of Archaeological Science at the University of Reading. Bell is a specialist in environmental archaeology, geoarchaeology and coastal and maritime archaeology.

In 2009, he was elected a Fellow of the British Academy (FBA), the United Kingdom's national academy for the humanities and social sciences.

== Selected publications ==
- The Mesolithic in Western Britain 2007. York: Council for British Archaeology Research Report 149
- Late Quaternary Environmental Change (with M.J.C. Walker). Second edition 2005. Harlow: Pearson / Prentice Hall
- Prehistoric Intertidal Archaeology in the Welsh Estuary 2000 (with Astrid Caseldine and Heike Neumann).
- The Experimental Earthwork Project 1960-1992. 1996 ( with Peter Fowler and Simon Hillson) York: Council for British Archaeology Research Report 100
- Past and Present Soil Erosion 1992 (edited with John Boardman). Oxford: Oxbow Monograph 22.
- Brean Down Excavations 1983-87. 1990. London: English Heritage Archaeological Report 15
- Wilsford Shaft excavations 1960-62. 1989 (with Paul Ashbee and Edwina Proudfoot). London: English Heritage Archaeological Report 11
