= John Thomas Underwood =

American entrepreneur, founder of typewriter company (1857-1937)

John Thomas Underwood (April 12, 1857, in London, England – July 2, 1937, in Osterville, Massachusetts) was an American entrepreneur and investor who founded the Underwood Typewriter Company.

== Biography ==
He was the elder brother of missionary Horace Grant Underwood and helped finance Horace's missionary work.

John and his two sisters, Hannah Underwood Stephens and Helen Underwood Conard, and his brothers, the Rev. Dr. Horace Grant Underwood and Frederick Wills Underwood, were all born in London. Their father, John Underwood (son of Thomas Underwood), operated an ink business in England and then moved to New Jersey. John met the engineer Franz Wagner, who had patented the H. L. Wagner Typewriting Machine. John subsequently bought the company, and founded the Underwood Typewriting Co. He set the office up in Manhattan and moved to Brooklyn where he and his wife, Grace, and their daughter, Gladys, lived at 336 Washington Avenue. He supported his brother Horace, who was one of the early Protestant missionaries to Korea, starting in 1885. John was active in Lafayette Avenue Presbyterian Church in Brooklyn. This was where the Rev. Dr. Frank L. Gosnell was assigned for student ministry while attending Union Theological Seminary in NY and met Helen Evelyn Conard.

Underwood became a successful entrepreneur. His typewriters were even used at the Imperial Court in Vienna. He was made an official Purveyor to the Imperial and Royal Court by emperor Franz Joseph I of Austria.

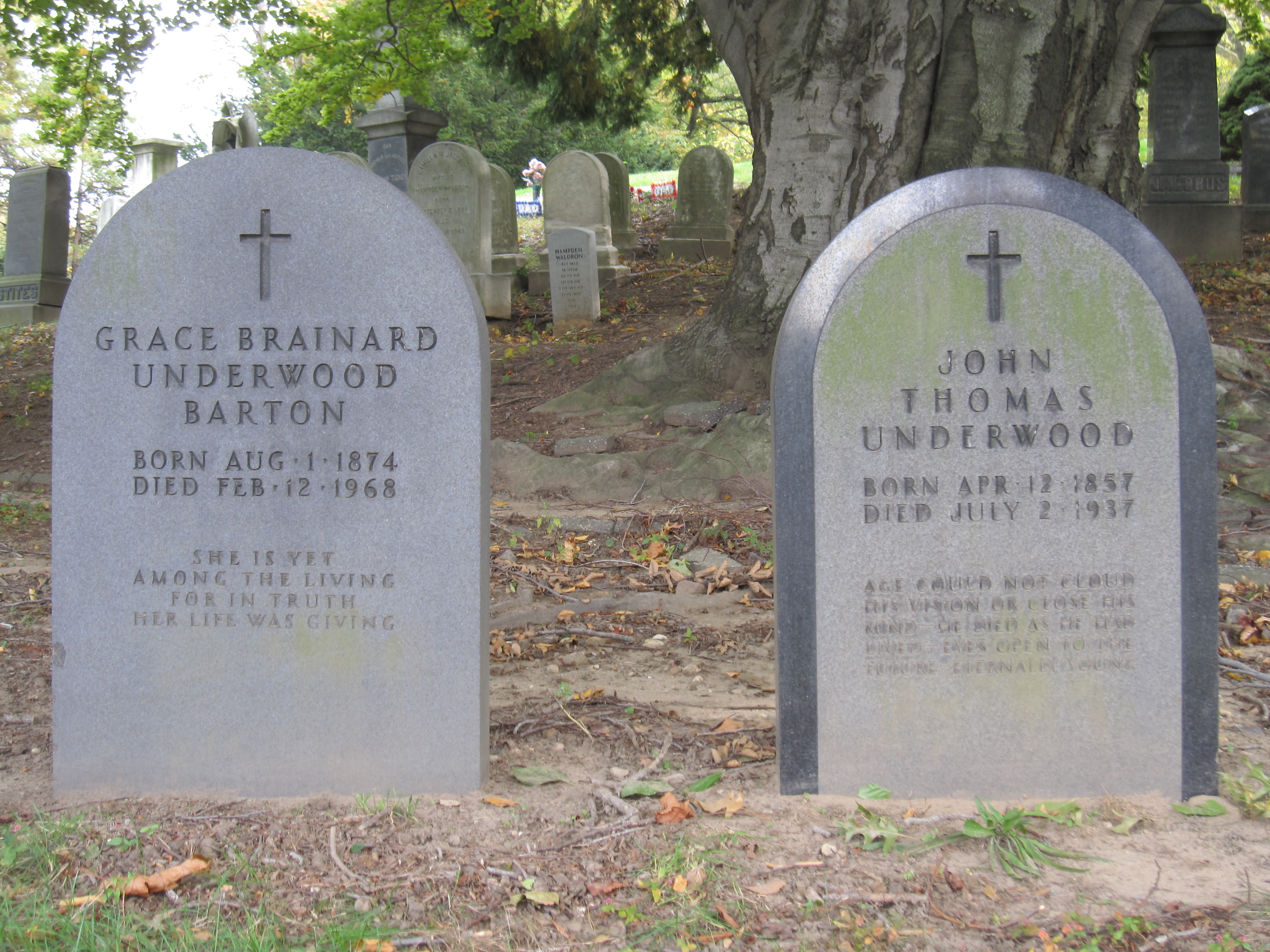
Grave of John Thomas Underwood in Brooklyn, New York

Underwood died in "Blink Bonnie", his summer home in Wianno, MA, on Cape Cod, and is buried at Green-Wood Cemetery in Brooklyn. The site of Underwood's mansion in Clinton Hill was donated by his widow and daughter to the borough of Brooklyn as a public park, named in his honor.
