= Pencoed Castle =

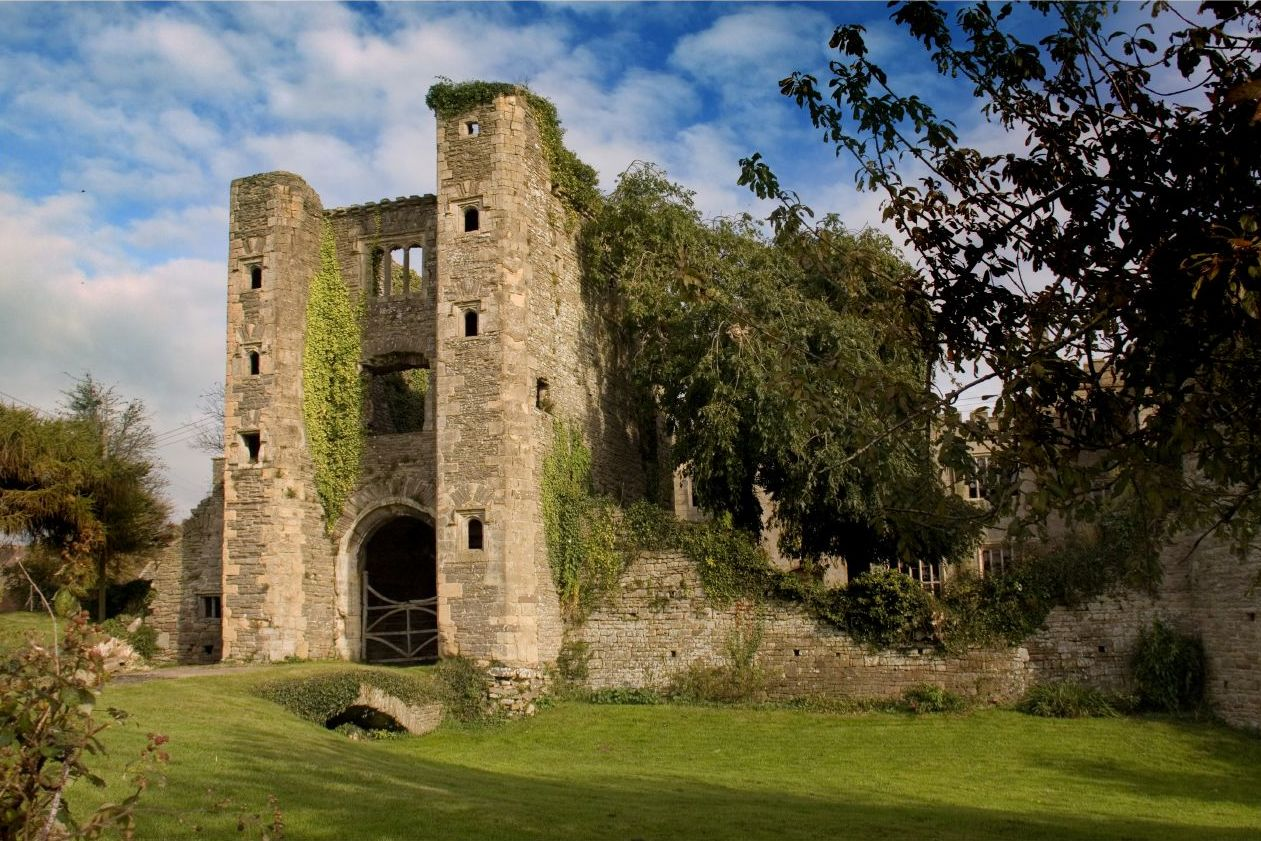
- The gatehouse at Pencoed

- Location within Newport
- 51°36′01″N 2°51′31″W
- Location: Llanmartin, Newport, Wales
- OS grid reference: ST 406 894

History
- Built: c.1500–1560

Listed Building – Grade II*
- Designated: 3 March 1952

Pencoed Castle is a ruined Tudor mansion, largely dating from the 16th century, in the parish of Llanmartin, now within the city of Newport, south Wales. It is located about 0.5 miles (0.80 km) east of Llanmartin village, and 0.5 miles (0.80 km) south-east of Llandevaud, at the end of a farm lane.

Some outbuildings, which may be habitable, exist on the grounds. The property was sold in September 2020 but specifics were not provided as to the new owner or the plans for the property. In the meantime, it remained in ruins, not open to the public.

== History ==
The Welsh name Pen-coed means "end of the wood", and refers to the site's location at the southwestern extremity of the Wentwood forest. It was the site of a Norman castle, owned by Sir Richard de la More in 1270. The tower at the south-west corner of the extant ruins dates from the late 13th century. The manor of Llanmartin was owned by the Kemeys family around 1300, but it is not clear whether Pencoed was a separate manor at that time.

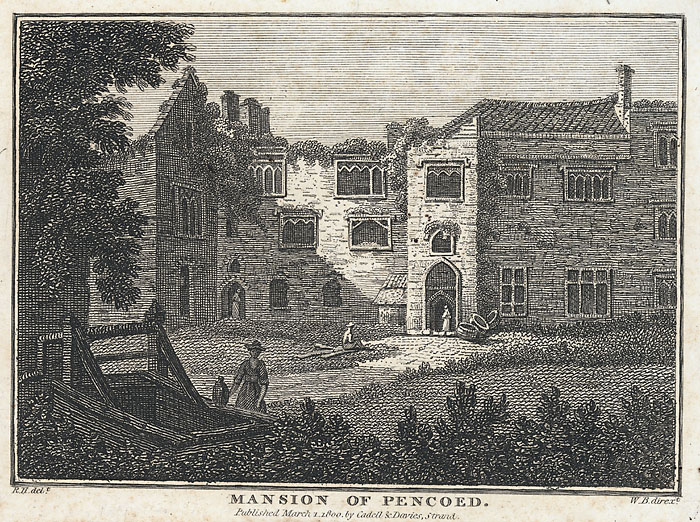
Pencoed in about 1800. Engraving by Richard Colt Hoare

By about 1470, the estate was in the hands of the Morgan family of Tredegar. It seems to have been owned by Morgan ap Jenkin Philip, and then his son, Sir Thomas Morgan (c.1453–1510), who is thought likely to have fought at the battle of Bosworth in 1485 and who was probably the first of his family to settle at Pencoed. He was followed by his son Sir William Morgan (c.1480–1542), and in turn his son Sir Thomas Morgan (c.1513–1565). After the end of the Wars of the Roses, the more peaceful nature of society allowed such houses to be built. According to the architectural writer John Newman, it is likely that parts of the remaining building were built by the first Sir Thomas before 1510, and the main range and gatehouse by his grandson (also Sir Thomas) between 1542 and 1565. In about 1545, John Leland mentioned Pencoed as the home of Sir Thomas Morgan, and described it as "a fair maner place".

Around 1584, the estate became the property of Sir Walter Montagu, the husband of Thomas Morgan's grand-daughter Anne; Montagu was also responsible for founding almshouses at Chepstow. In 1701, Montagu's descendants sold Pencoed to John Jeffreys, MP. His son in turn sold it in 1749 to Admiral Thomas Mathews of Llandaff, also an MP. In later years the property was owned successively by Sir Mark Wood, Sir Robert Salusbury, and Thomas Perry, but became increasingly dilapidated and ruined, and was let out to farmers.

=== 20th and 21st century ===
It was sold in 1914 to David Alfred Thomas, later Lord Rhondda. Thomas intended to restore the house, and began work on the main central building, but it was incomplete at the time of his death in 1918. His widow then commissioned Chepstow architect Eric Francis to build a new house adjoining the ruins, in 1922; she sold it a few years later and it is now a farmhouse. In the mid-1950s, the ruins were used for filming an episode of the popular British TV series, The Adventures of Robin Hood. A bungalow was built nearby in the 1960s, but the castle remains themselves have become increasingly ruinous and derelict.

In 1953, at the time of the historic listing, the castle was described as consisting of "a large three storied Tudor manorhouse constructed of dressed stone and re-faced in ashlar to the front (W) elevation, with battlemented parapet". The summary spoke of some old restorations probably from the early 1900s: The castle has been much restored, being refaced, reroofed and refenestrated using Tudor style chamfered mullion windows ... The side and rear walls are mainly unrestored, although some replacement windows are evident".

A 2011 Royal Commission report stated that "restoration work stopped at the outbreak of war, and was resumed by Lady Rhondda and her daughter in 1919 ... However, work was again abandoned, and in 1931 the Rhonddas sold the castle, since when it has been neglected". Another report stated that the property "was sold a few years later and became used as a farmhouse".

Plans to use the site as part of a golf and hotel complex were first mooted in 1989. In 1998, further proposals came forward to build a large theme park, billed as the largest in Europe, around the ruins of Pencoed. The promoters of the scheme, which would have been known as Legend Court, withdrew the proposal after it failed to receive planning permission in 2000.

The site was put up for sale in 2001, and bought by farmer turned property developer Peter Morgan. In July 2007, planning permission was granted to Morspan Holdings to convert the castle "into offices, and to build 12 houses in the grounds", with certain conditions. For example, none of the additional work was to begin until the castle had been restored. A report at the time stated that in recent years, the castle had been used "as a chicken shed and a shelter for cattle and sheep". Reports in subsequent years indicated that the castle had not been restored.

In 2016 Georgina Symonds, a call girl whom Peter Morgan retained for £10,000 a month and allowed to live rent-free in a £300,000 bungalow on the grounds of Pencoed Caste, was killed at the Bungalow by Morgan when she attempted to blackmail him by threatening to show compromising photos of him to his family. He confessed to killing Symonds, but mounted a diminished capacity defence due to his having Asperger syndrome. He was found guilty of murder and sentenced to life imprisonment.

In September 2020, the castle, with its 9.39 hectares (23.21 acres) of land and outbuildings, was again to be sold, by auction. The sale was completed for £1,100,000. The auction listing said that planning permission had already been obtained for restoration of the castle and for conversion of the outbuildings to offices and dwellings.

== Buildings ==
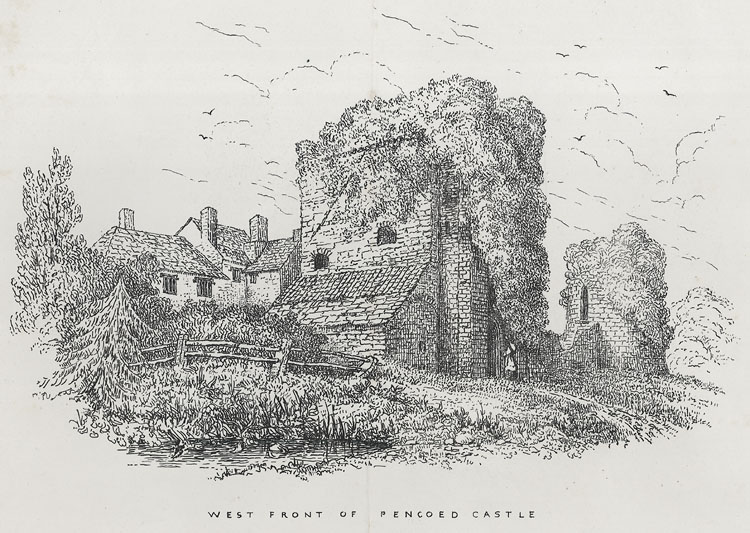
The west front of Pencoed Castle, depicted in 1865

According to Newman, "the large and imposing Tudor mansion languishes as an unconsolidated ruin in a farmyard. To come upon it at the end of an inconsequential lane is quite a shock."

The tower is the earliest part of the building; it is built of Old Red Sandstone and is largely intact. The gatehouse is entirely of Tudor origin, and "on a much grander scale". It is rectangular in plan, of three storeys, with square turrets. The main range is largely intact, rising to three storeys and constructed of ashlar stone, similar to that of Raglan Castle, built around the same time. It has a battlemented parapet. The great hall has a central three-storey porch, with a two storey range on the south side and a three-storey building on the north side. There is also a three-storey northern parlour wing, which originally housed kitchens, and the remains of a south wing.

The interior of the building was reported as entirely ruined, apart from the rooms rebuilt for Lord Rhondda, and largely unsurveyed. Close to the house are the ruins of a 16th-century dovecote. There is also a continuous range of stone-built barns, probably of the 16th and 17th centuries.

A 2011 site survey provided these specifics as to the condition at that time: "courtyard castle, now derelict and abandoned. Parts are completely ruined, other parts have been partially restored, chiefly the range on the east side of the courtyard ... The main residential block was along the eastern side of the courtyard. This stands largely intact and partially restored. Close to the north side of the castle stands a twentieth century house..."

The description before sale in 2020 suggested that some restoration had been completed on the property. The former farm house contained three residential flats while a detached bungalow contained another flat.

Pencoed Castle was given Grade II* listed building status on 3 March 1952. The ruins are not open to the public. The castle grounds, which contain evidence of a Tudor terraced garden, are listed at Grade II on the Cadw/ICOMOS Register of Parks and Gardens of Special Historic Interest in Wales.
