= Nigel Smith =

Nigel Smith may refer to:

- Nigel Smith (footballer, born 1958), English football defender
- Nigel Smith (footballer, born 1969), English football striker
- Nigel Smith (racing driver) (born 1951), British businessman and retired auto racing driver
- Nigel Smith (alpine skier) (born 1964), British former alpine skier
- Nigel Smith (literature scholar), British literature professor
- Nigel J. T. Smith, British Canadian astroparticle physicist
- Nigel Martin-Smith, English musical band manager who formed 1990s British boy band Take That
- Nigel Starmer-Smith (born 1944), English retired international rugby union player, rugby journalist, and commentator
- Nigel Wenban-Smith (born 1936), British former diplomat
