= Wimpey no-fines house =

Construction method and designs

The Wimpey No-fines House was a construction method and series of house designs produced by the George Wimpey company and intended for mass-production of social housing for families, developed under the Ministry of Works post-World War II Emergency Factory Made programme. "No-fines" refers to the type of concrete used – concrete with no fine aggregates.

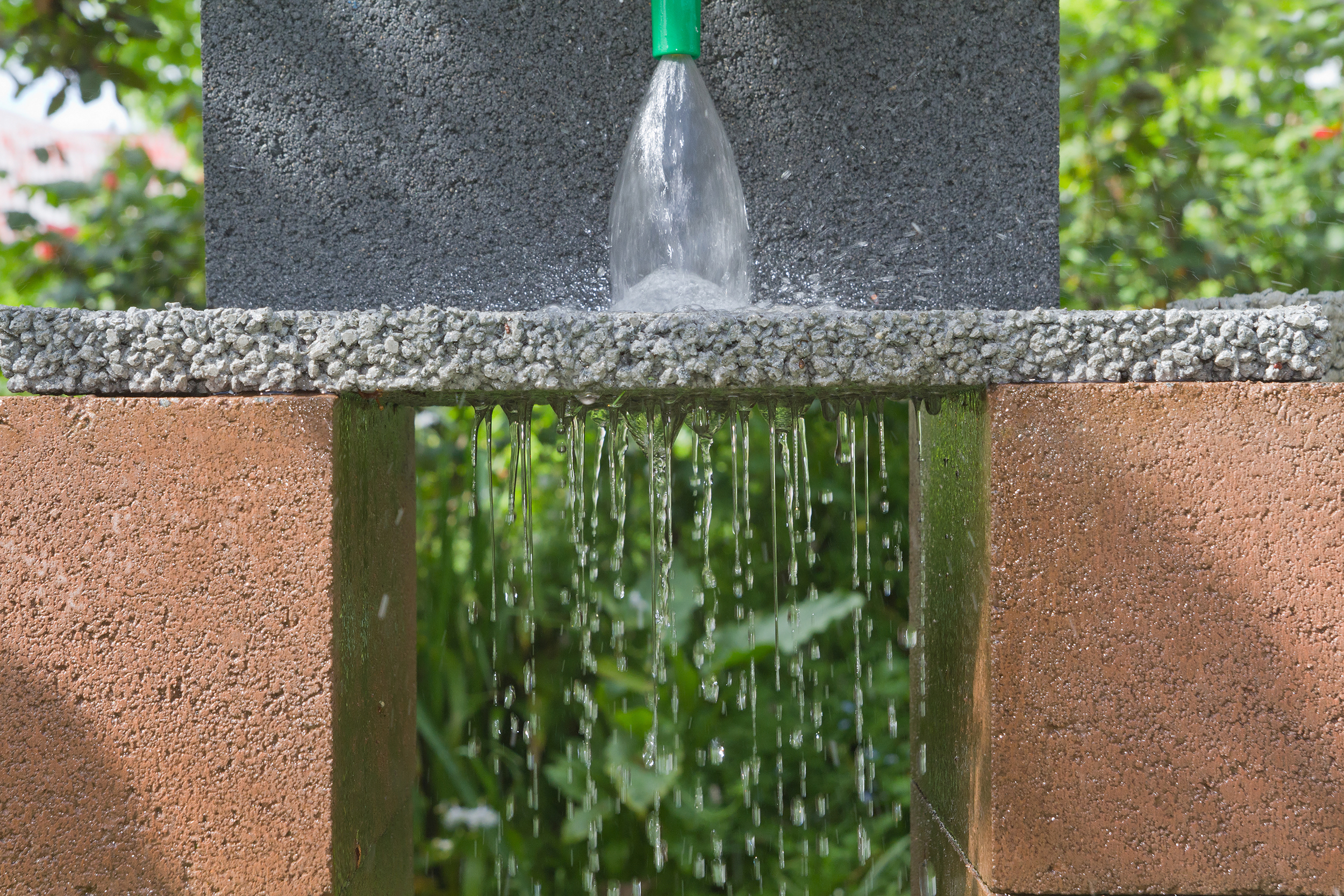
Example of permeable concrete made with no fine aggregates

== Background ==
A rapid increase in the birth rate compounded by the loss of city centre housing during the Blitz meant demand for accommodation in post-World War II Britain was particularly intense. Skilled labour and materials were in short supply and commanded high prices. Local government around the country commissioned large building projects to meet the demand, and innovative designs like the no-fines house gave private contractors like George Wimpey, and later the Corolite Construction Company, a compelling proposition to give the state. Wimpey's houses could be produced rapidly and cheaply, minimising the need for in-demand skills like bricklaying.

From the early 1920s, around 1000 of these 'clinker' aggregate or 'no fines' houses were built in Edinburgh, Liverpool and Manchester, with 650 being built in Manchester starting in 1924 and taking 3 years to complete. In 2010, the south Manchester suburb of Burnage still displays fine examples of no-fines, clinker construction. Wimpey's design was particularly successful and many thousands were built in the late 1940s and early 1950s. In the late 1950s, the emphasis for public housing moved to high-rise accommodation.

== Design ==
Designed to a Ministry of Works specification, no-fines houses focused on functional design for family life. There are only a handful of variations in the houses built, and typically all variants are found on each estate:

- 2-bedroom semi-detached and terraced houses
- 3-bedroom semi-detached houses of which there are two styles
  - a gable end at both sides of the house
  - a sloping hip end at both sides of the house
- Short terraces of 3, 4, 6 or 8 houses, each of which either
- 2 bedroom end terrace (as found in St. Helens Merseyside)
- 3-bedroom end or mid-terrace
- 4-bedroom mid-terrace with integral ginnel (or ginnels on 6 and 8 house terraces) for rear access

Many examples are accompanied by a single-storey brick-built outbuilding, either in semi-detached arrangement set behind the house, or linking one house to the next.

- Shops in rows of 3 shops with 4 flats/bedsits above the shops, with access to the flats via stairs on either side of the shops.
- 3 storey blocks of 1 & 2 bedroom flats. These often had a large glass panel made up of smaller windows situated above the main entrance door to the flats.
- Maisonettes, usually in terraces of four with access to the upper dwellings by stairs at each end of the terrace.

By today's standards the houses are set in large plots of land intended to allow the occupants to engage in domestic vegetable production. This was achieved through siting in low-cost locations.

== Construction ==
No-fines houses were built with a ten-inch (254mm) concrete shell cast in situ. The concrete for the entire outer structure was cast in one operation using reusable formwork. The ground floor was either concrete or traditional timber joists and floorboards; the first floor was made with traditional timber joists and floorboards. Interior walls were sometimes a mixture of conventional brick and blockwork construction or timber studs and plasterboard (9mm), with load-bearing studs to suit first floor joist spans. To weatherproof the structure, the external facade was rendered.

=== Style ===
The regular, grey finish of the houses has led some to criticise the estates as having a bleak, concrete jungle aesthetic. This is accentuated by the layout of the pronounced geometric structure of many of the estates on which they were built. In more recent years (particularly since many were sold into private hands following the Housing Act 1980) no-fines estates have taken on a more varied look with most examples being painted (often in light pastel colours) and modified with porches or extensions.

== Controversy ==
By the 1980s, political opinion had swung against social housing, and those living in it seemed to experience a relatively low quality of life and poor health. There were also concerns about the long-term structural soundness of the houses due to their novel construction. Parliament commissioned a report into the design of the houses and its impact on the occupants. It found that the health issues were due to poor windows and poor heating; the insulating properties of the no-fines walls were adjudged reasonable compared to single skin buildings of the same period. It concluded that the buildings were structurally sound. Subsequent improvements to windows and heating facilities have brought the houses broadly up to modern living standards and the design is now seen as largely vindicated. Most lenders will consider these for mortgage purposes without issue.

== Examples ==
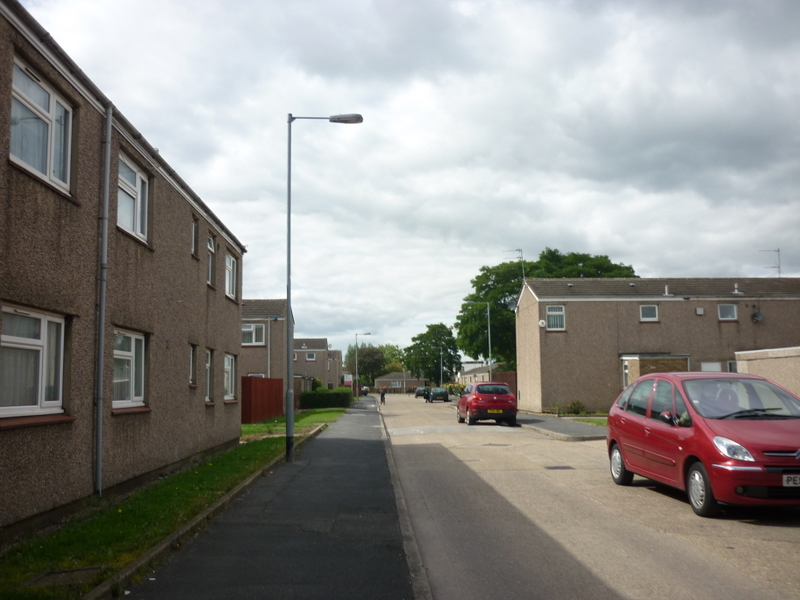
No Fines houses on Sweet Dews Grove, Hull

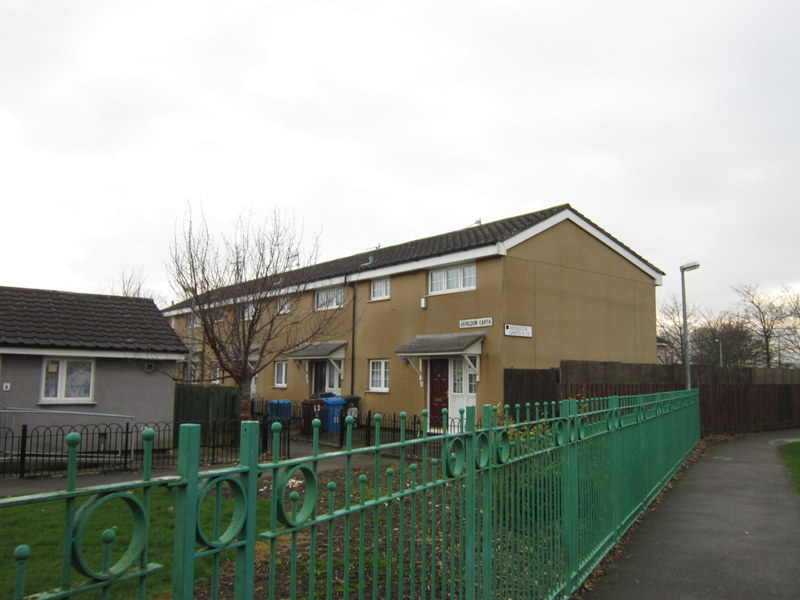
No Fines houses on Abingdon Garth, Hull

No-fines houses were typically built in estates of a few hundred separate dwellings. Examples are found throughout the UK, and include:

England

- Gamesley Estate in Glossop. An unusual estate because it was built by Manchester City Council but in neighbouring Derbyshire.
- Hesters Way, Whaddon, St. Pauls and Rowanfield in Cheltenham
- Chaucer Way and Hardy Close, Hitchin, Hertfordshire
- Canley, Tile Hill and Keresley in Coventry
- Clifton Estate in Nottingham
- Innsworth and Elmbridge in Gloucester
- Abbeydale in Redditch, Worcestershire
- New Addington in Croydon
- Rowlatts Hill, Beaumont Leys and Braunstone Frith in Leicester
- The Millfields estate in Wednesbury, West Midlands
- Parsons Close in Portsmouth
- Orchard Park Estate in Kingston upon Hull
- Kirkby near Liverpool
- Houndstone in Yeovil
- Hemlington in Middlesbrough, North Yorkshire
- Thorpe Edge Estate in Bradford, West Yorkshire
- Barn Hall Estate in Wickford, Essex
- Howard Road/Elin Way Estate in Meldreth, South Cambridgeshire

Scotland

- Hilton in Inverness
- Historically Pilton in Edinburgh but the area has since 2015 seen the mid 20th century Brutalist estates knocked down and replaced by higher quality social housing, built with a focus on creating communities.
- Milton and Bishopbriggs in Glasgow
- Erskine, circa 1970. in Renfrewshire constructed to deal with the Glasgow overspill
- Harestanes in Kirkintilloch
- Musselburgh – known locally as the 'Wimpeys'
- Charles Avenue in Arbroath

Wales

- Underwood in Newport, Wales

== See also ==
- "Pre-fab", another solution to the post World War II housing crisis
- Boot house, a solution following World War I
