= Underwood Typewriter Company =

American typewriter manufacturing company

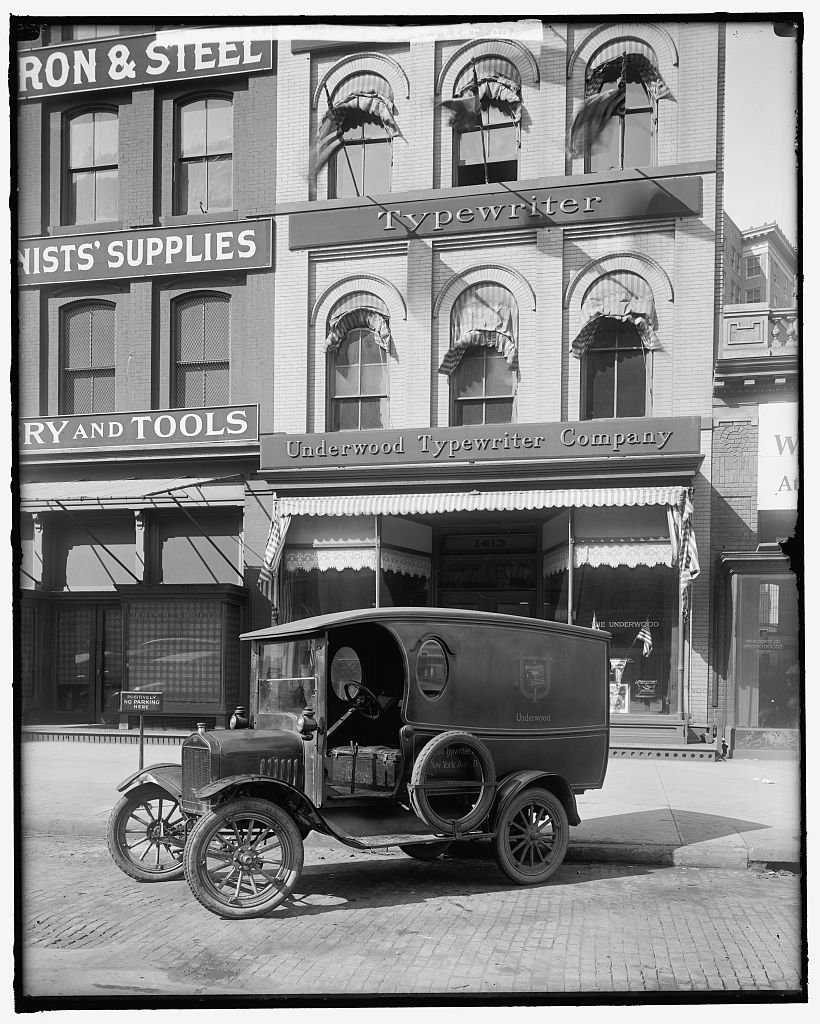
- Exterior of the Underwood Typewriter Company with vehicle outside c. 1905
- Type: Private company
- Industry: Business machines
- Founded: 1895; 131 years ago
- Founder: John T. Underwood
- Defunct: 1963; 63 years ago
- Fate: Acquired by Olivetti (1959)
- Headquarters: Manhattan, New York, U.S.
- Key people: Franz X. Wagner (inventor)
- Products: Typewriters
- Parent: Olivetti

The Underwood Typewriter Company was an American manufacturer of typewriters headquartered in New York City, with manufacturing facilities in Hartford, Connecticut. Underwood produced what is considered the first widely successful, modern typewriter. By 1939, Underwood had produced five million machines.

== History ==
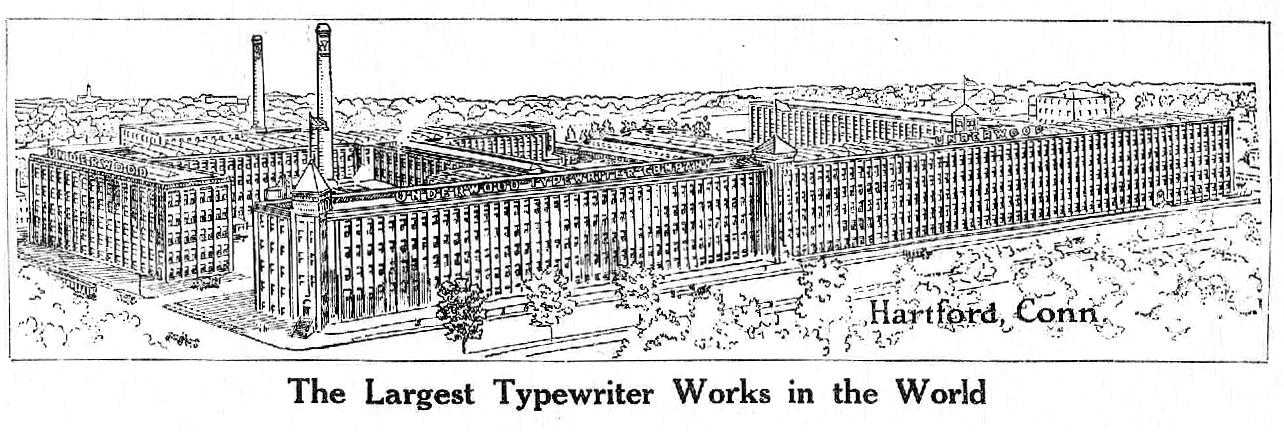
Underwood Typewriter factory in Hartford, Connecticut, circa 1911–1912

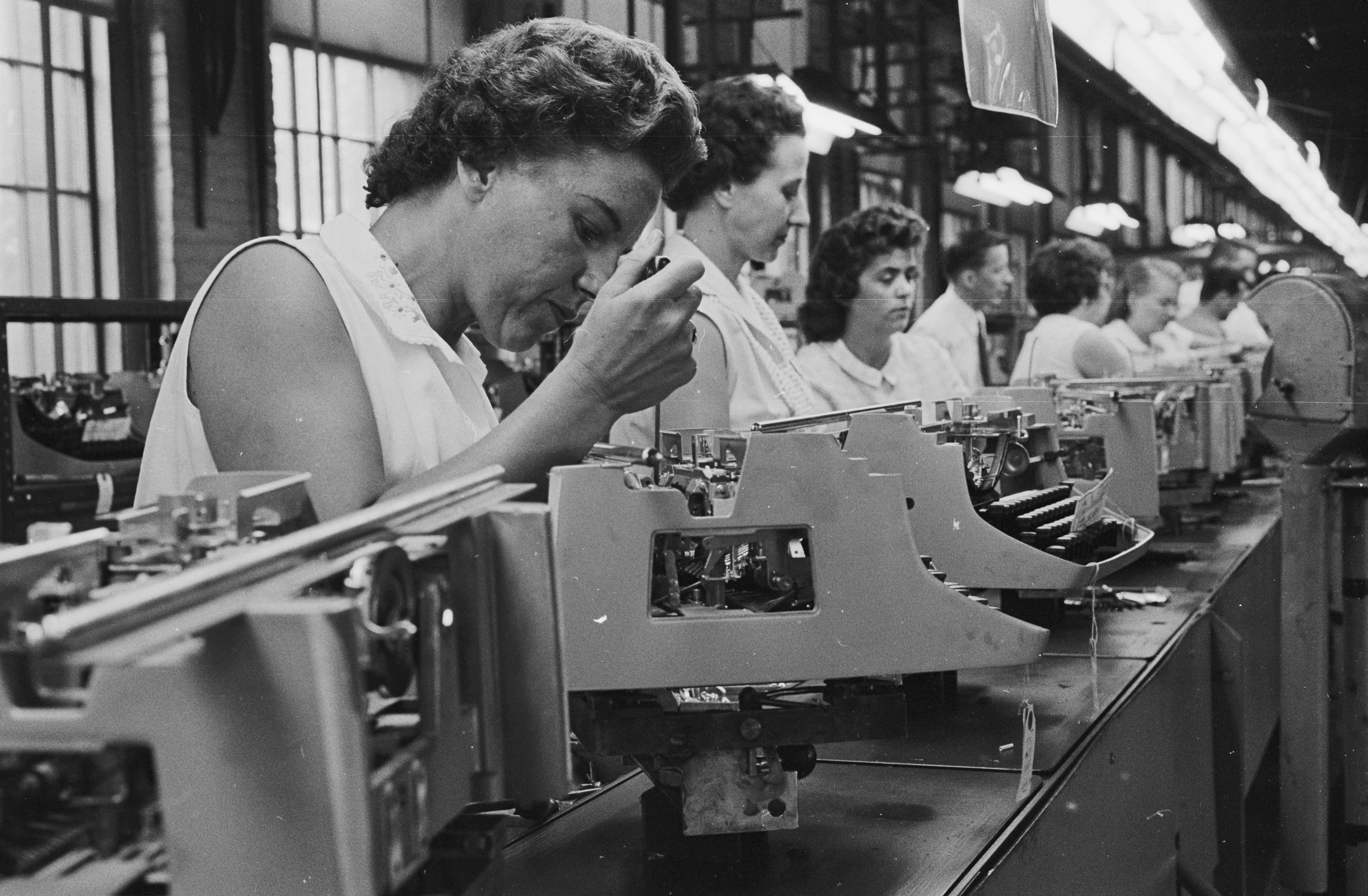
Women assembling Underwoods at the Hartford factory, 1962

In 1874, the Underwood family made typewriter ribbon and carbon paper, and was among a number of firms that produced these goods for Remington. When Remington decided to start producing ribbons themselves, the Underwoods opted to manufacture typewriters.

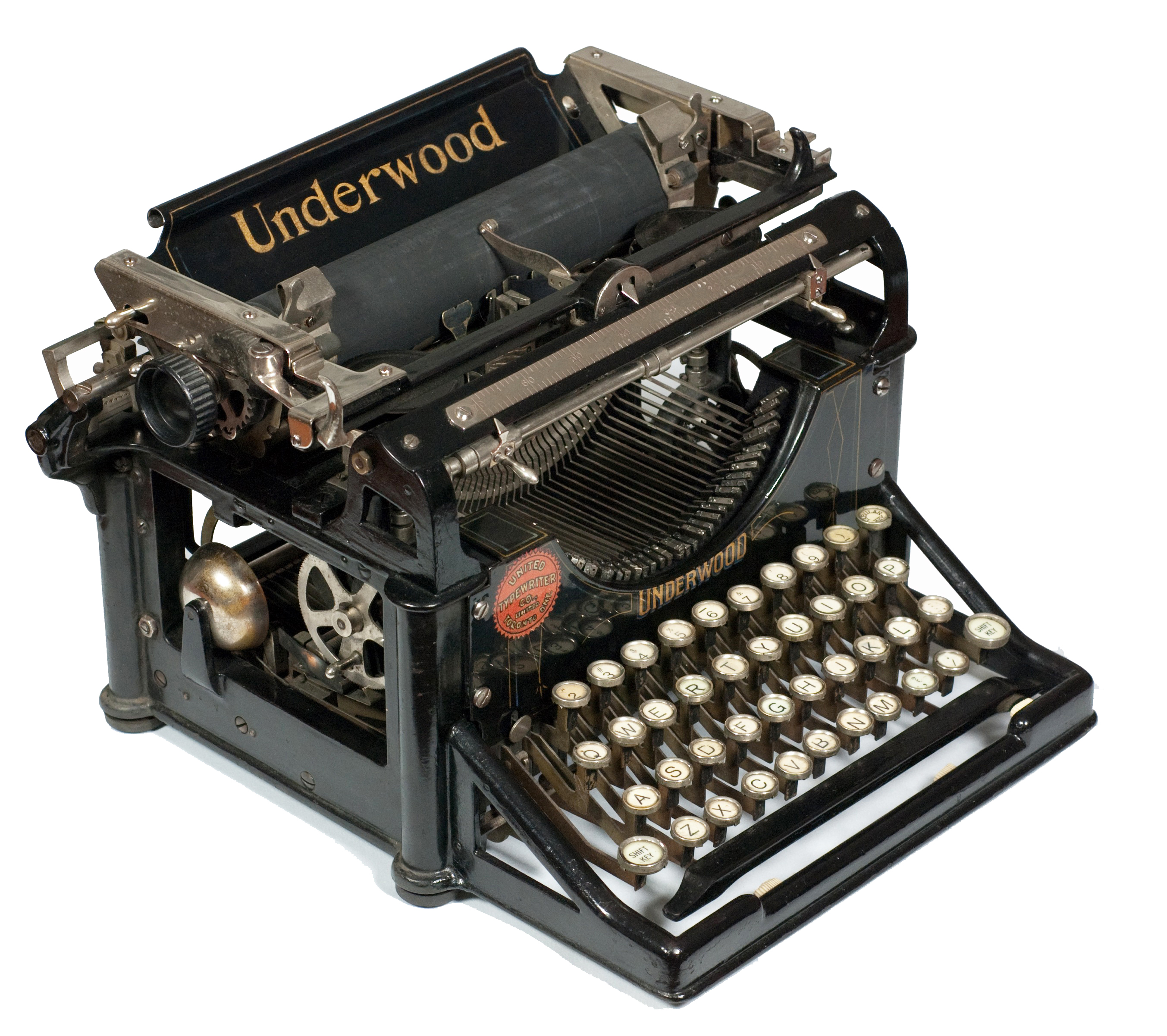
Underwood 1 typewriter, 1896

The original Underwood typewriter was invented by German-American Franz Xaver Wagner, who showed it to entrepreneur John Thomas Underwood. Underwood supported Wagner and bought the company, recognizing the importance of the machine.

The Underwood Number 5 launched in 1900 has been described as "the first truly modern typewriter". Two million of these typewriters had been sold by the early 1920s, and their sales "were equal in quantity to all of the other firms in the typewriter industry combined". When the company was in its heyday as the world's largest typewriter manufacturer, its factory in Hartford, Connecticut was turning out typewriters at the rate of one per minute and, along with Royal Typewriter Company, made Hartford the "Typewriter Capitol of the World".

Philip Dakin Wagoner was appointed president of the Elliott-Fisher Company after World War I (1914–1918). Elliott-Fisher became the parent company of the Underwood Typewriter Company and the Sundstrand Adding Machine Co. In 1927, Wagoner reorganized the company into Underwood-Elliott-Fisher, which later became the Underwood Corporation. The reorganization was completed in December 1927. John Thomas Underwood was elected chairman, and Wagoner president of Underwood Elliott-Fisher.

In the years before World War II, Underwood built the world's largest typewriter in an attempt to promote itself. The typewriter was on display at Garden Pier in Atlantic City, New Jersey, for several years and attracted large crowds. Often, Underwood would have a young woman sitting on each of the large keys. The enormous typewriter was scrapped for metal when the war started.

During World War II, Underwood produced M1 carbines. Approximately 540,000 M1 carbines were produced from late 1942 to May 1944. Underwood also produced M1 carbine barrels for the U.S. government. Under the Free Issue Barrel Program, barrels were sent to other prime manufacturers who did not possess the machines to make barrels.

In 1945 Wagoner was elected chairman of the board of Underwood, and Leon C. Stowell was elected president. Wagoner remained chief executive. Olivetti bought a controlling interest in Underwood in 1959 and completed the merger in October 1963, becoming known in the U.S. as Olivetti-Underwood with headquarters in New York City and entering the electromechanical calculator business.

By the 1970s and 1980s, the typewriter market had matured under the market dominance of large companies from Britain, Europe and the United States – but before the advent of daisy wheel and electronic machines – Underwood and the other major manufacturers faced strong competition from typewriters from Asia, including Brother Industries and Silver Seiko Ltd. of Japan.

The Underwood brand appears in 2021 on some cash registers produced by Olivetti.

== Notable users ==
Some writers who had endorsed with Underwood typewriters such as William Faulkner, F. Scott Fitzgerald, Ernest Hemingway and Robert E. Howard.

== In popular media ==
The Underwood brand of typewriters is mentioned and seen in the TV Series House of Cards. In episode 25, main character and Vice President of the United States Frank Underwood uses an Underwood typewriter to write a letter to President Garrett Walker. In this letter, he implies his father as having been an heir to the Underwood typewriter fortune. Episode 27 reveals Frank's father to have been named Calvin, and no Calvin Underwood ever held stake or sway over the typewriter company in real life.

In the film The Day of the Jackal, an Underwood typewriter is used by a French police officer while being dictated to by his superior officer. In the scene the machine is filmed looking at the rear panel where the name Underwood is visible.

In the film Finding Forrester the character William Forrester uses an Underwood SX while Jamal Wallace uses an Underwood Touch-Master Five.

In the mocumentary series Parks and Recreation, the character Ron Swanson retrieves a pre-1948 Underwood SS/Rhythm Touch (which he verbally mis-identifies as an Underwood 5) from a dumpster, buys a new ribbon from "electronic bay dot com" (eBay), and shows his delight by declaring that he is going to "type every word I know!".

== Gallery ==
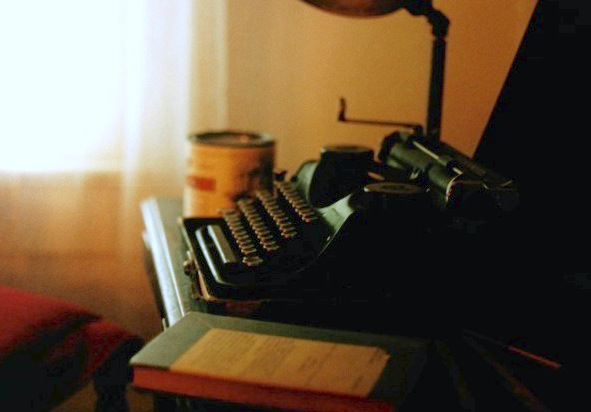
William Faulkner's Underwood Universal Portable in his office at Rowan Oak, which is now maintained by the University of Mississippi in Oxford as a museum.

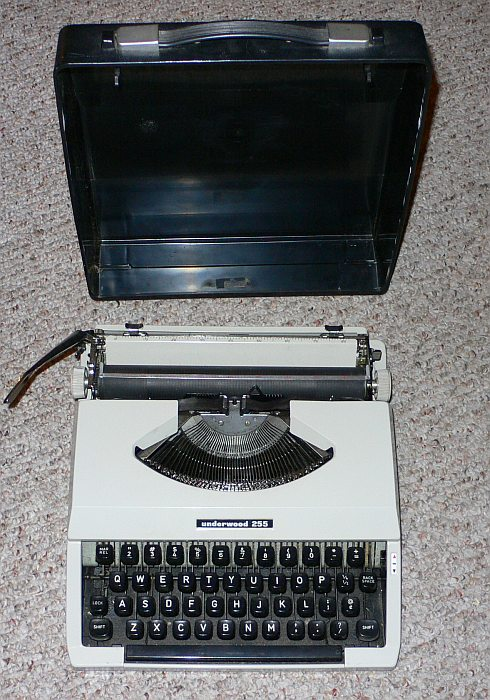
A student's portable underwood 255 manufactured circa 1977 in Japan

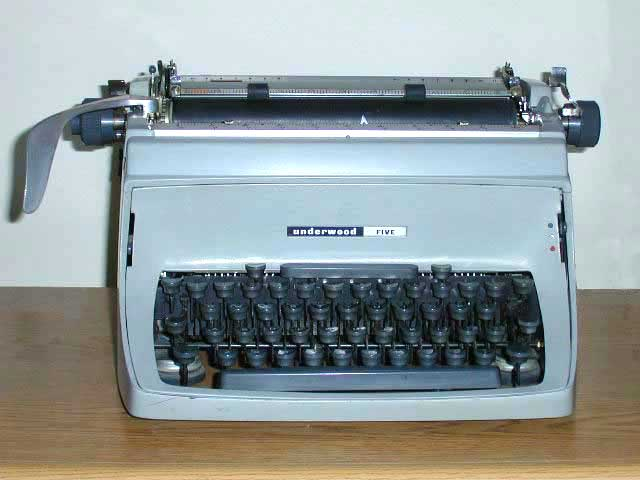
The Underwood Touch-Master 5 was among the last desktop models produced at the Underwood factory in the early 1960s

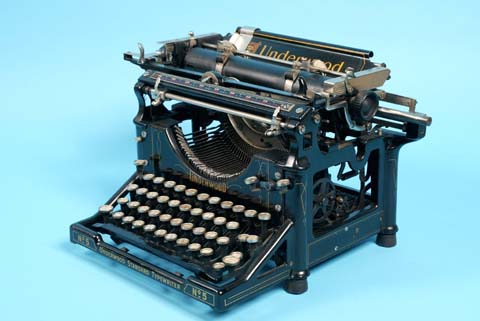
Underwood No. 5, in the collection of The Children's Museum of Indianapolis

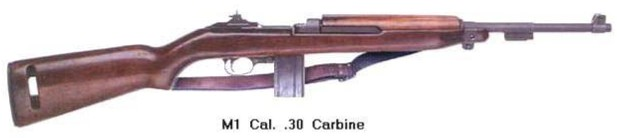
During World War II Underwood produced M1 Carbines for the War Department

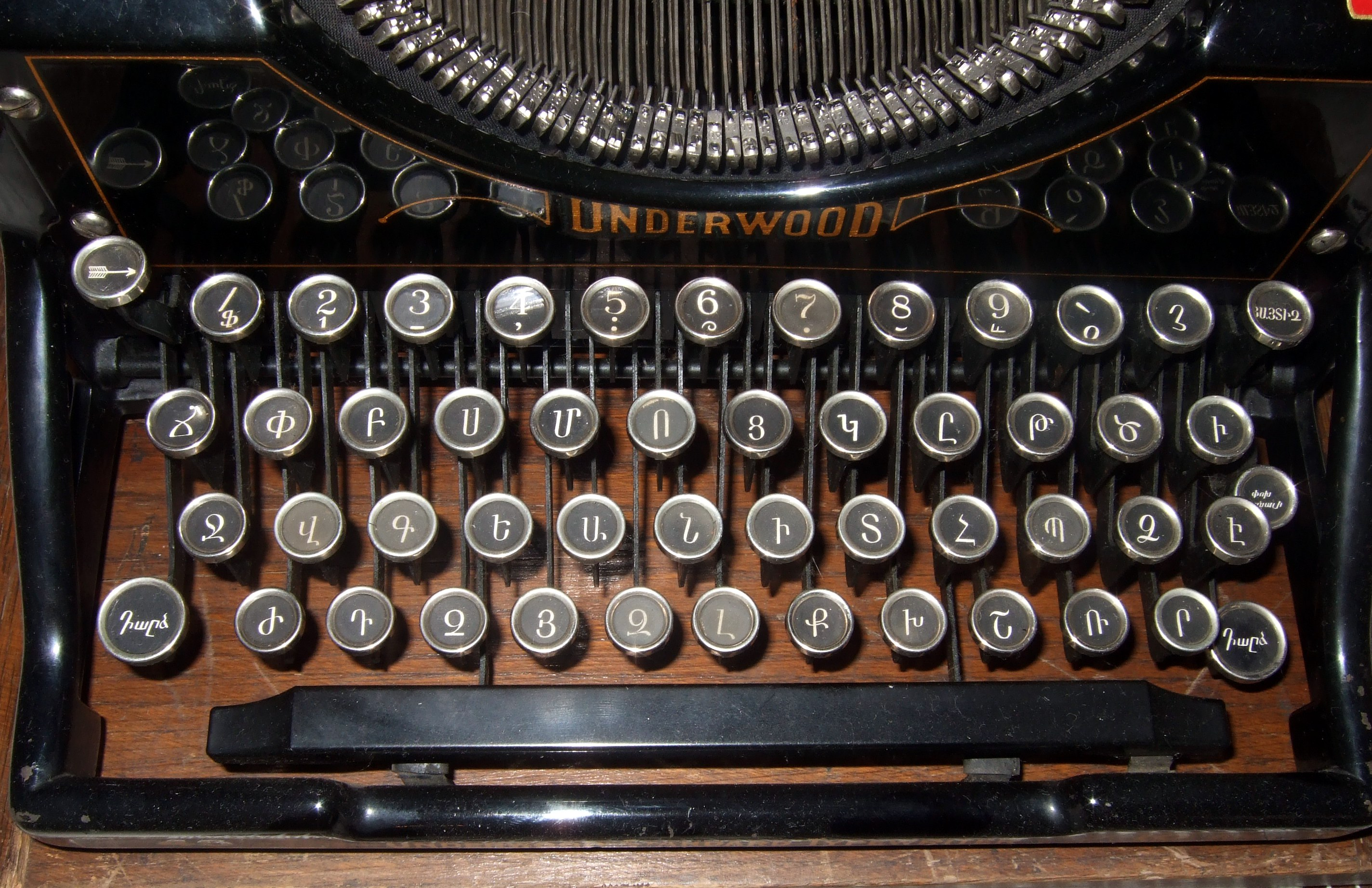
An Underwood typewriter with Armenian letters.

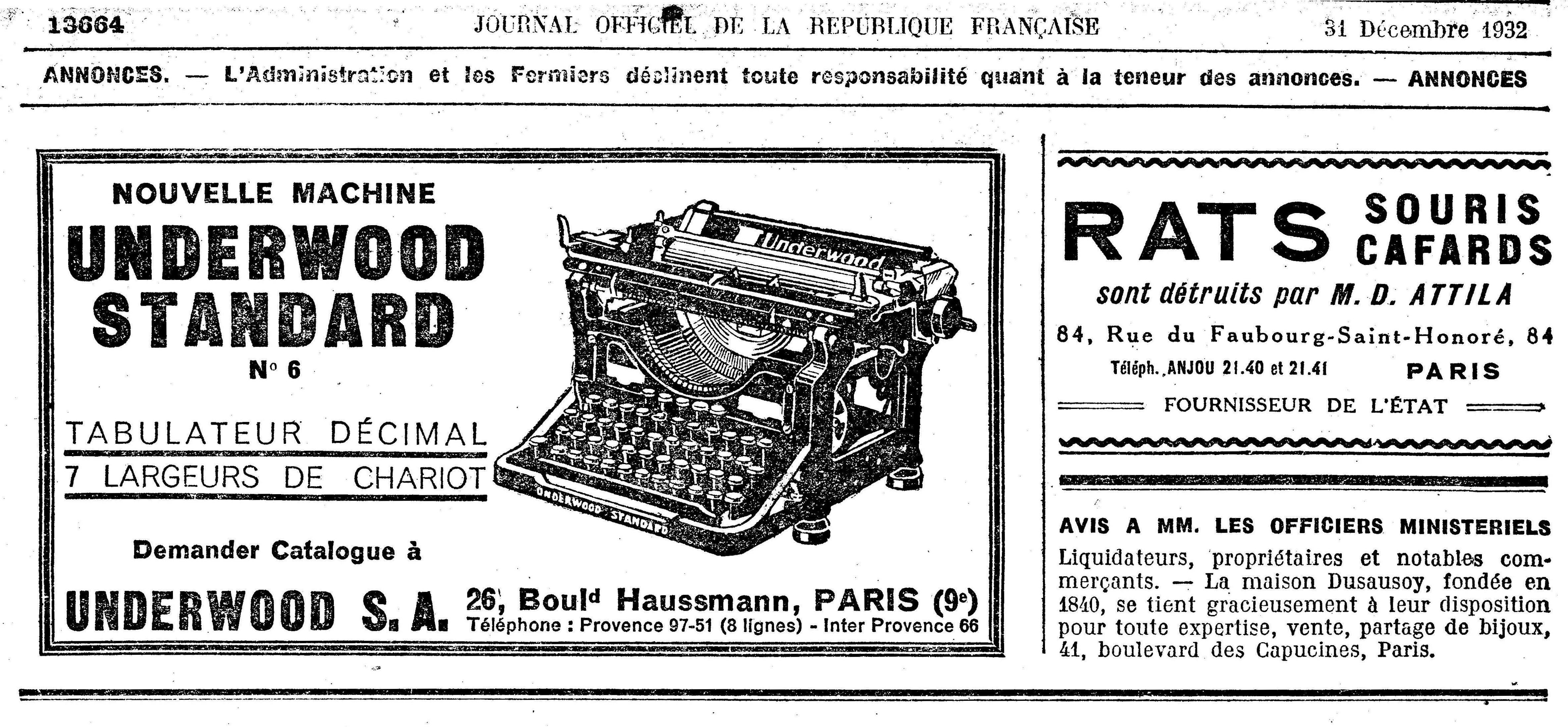
"Underwood standard n° 6" advertisement in France

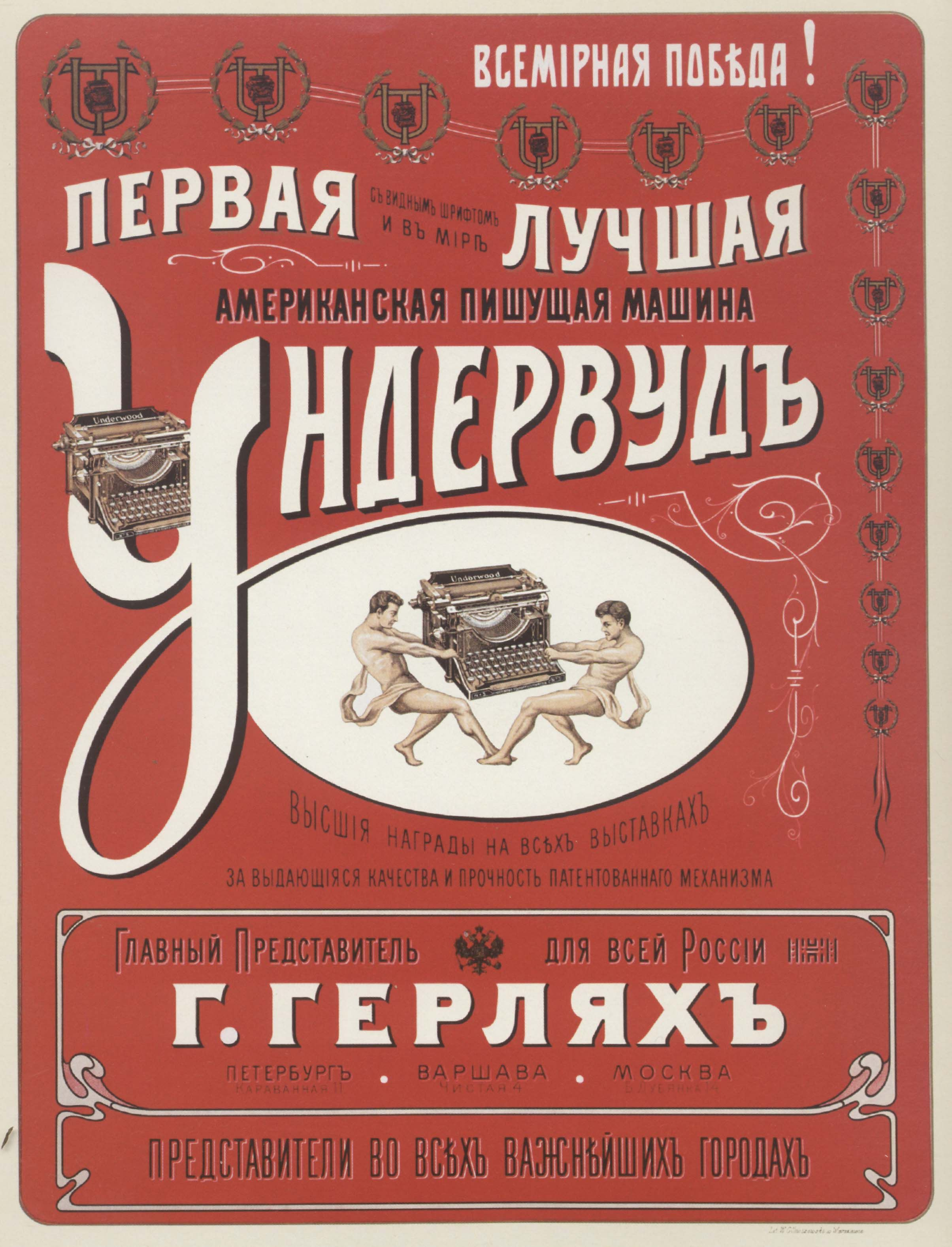
Underwood typewriter advertisement in Russia (1900)

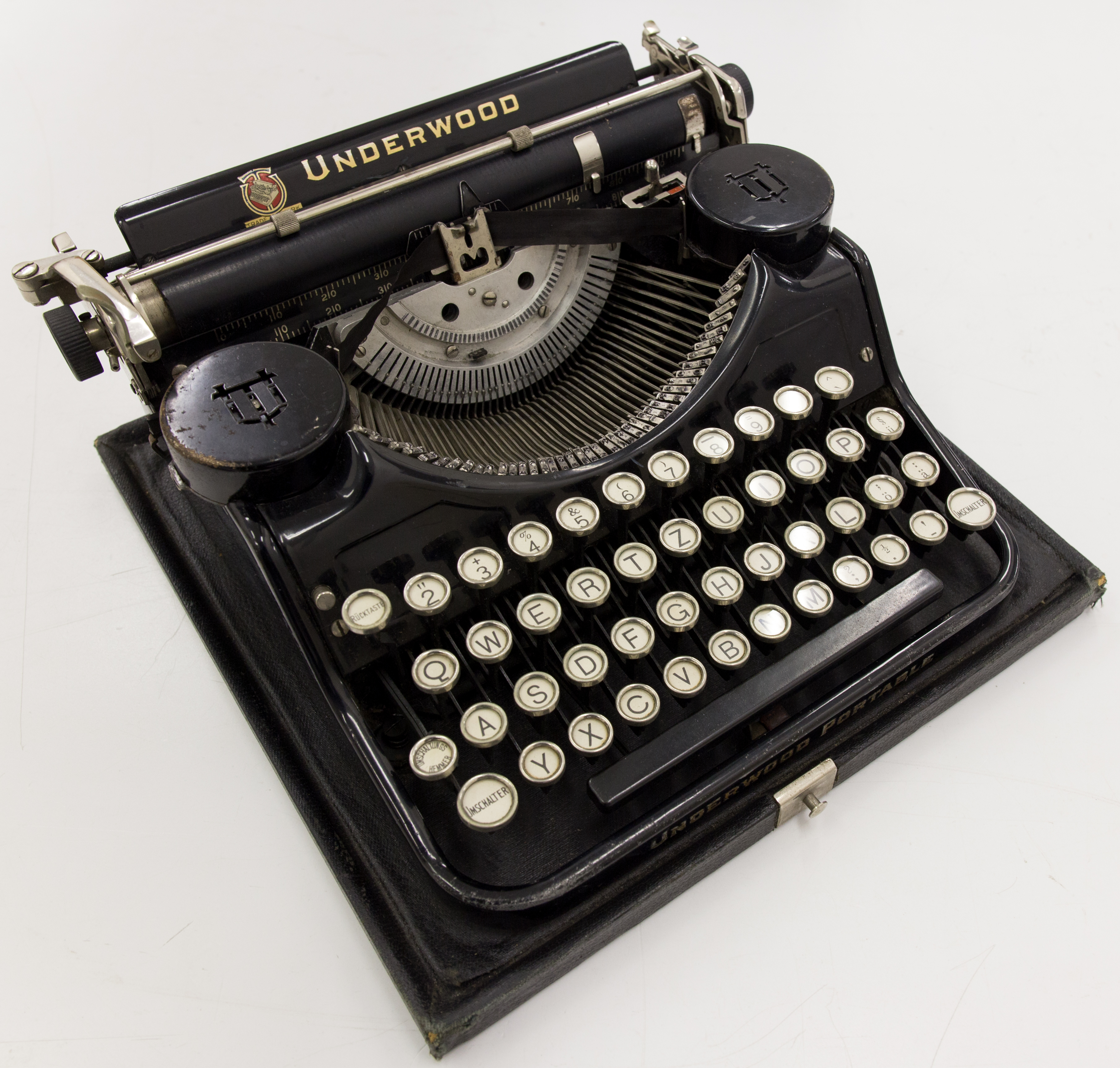
Underwood Portable typewriter at the Museum Europäischer Kulturen

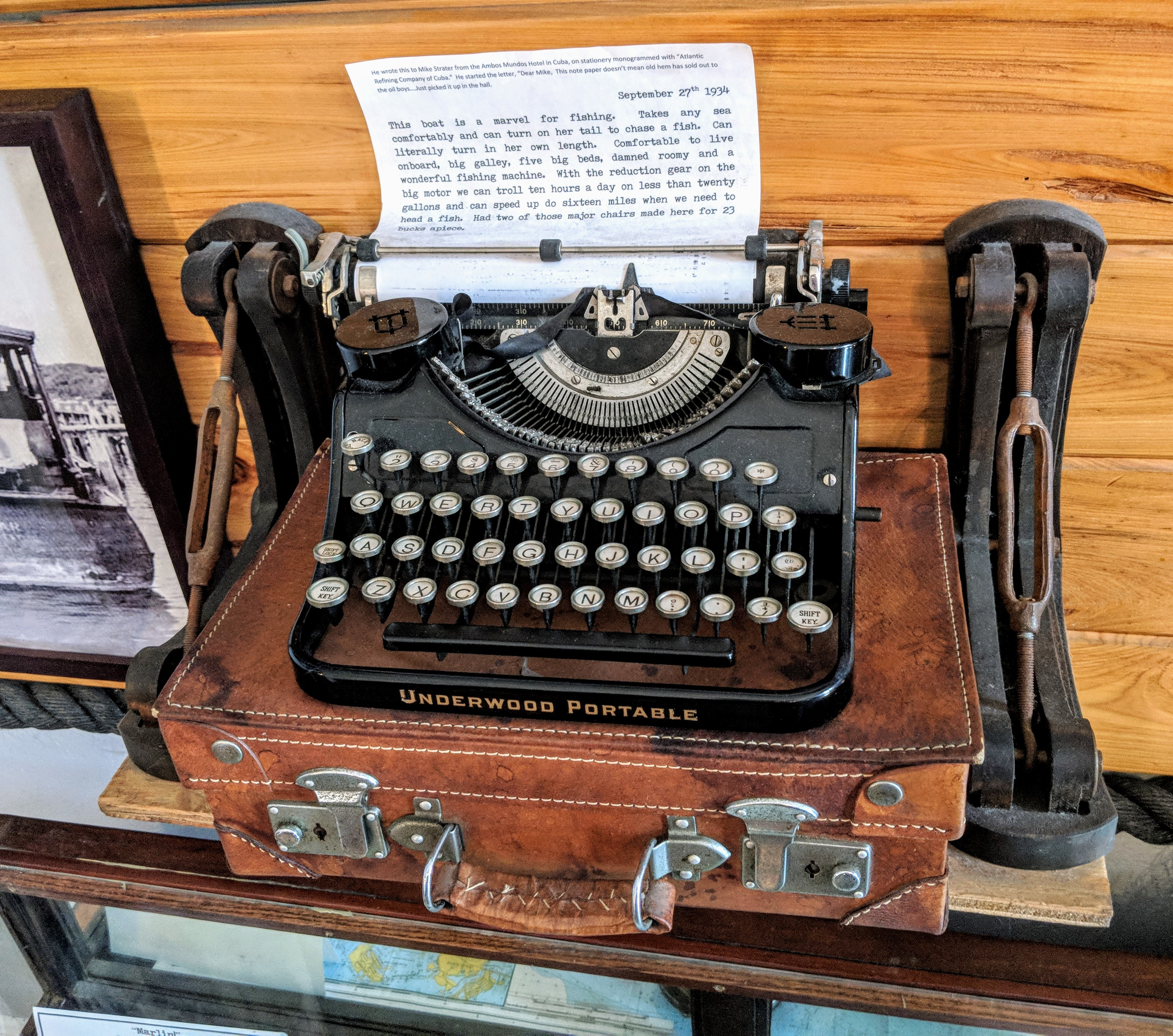
Ernest Hemingway's portable Underwood typewriter

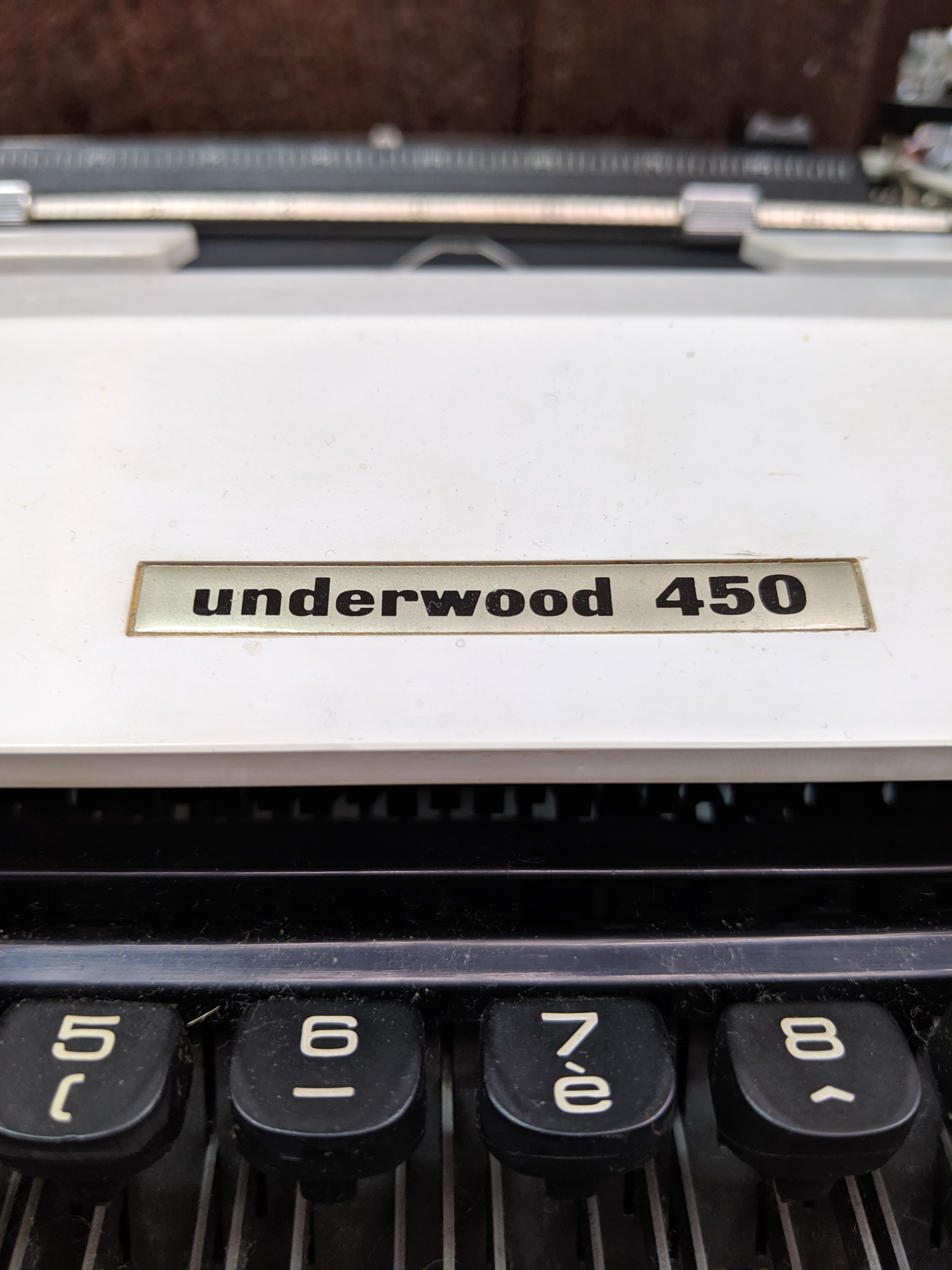
Underwood 450, Italian version, detail
