= Justice Underwood =

Justice Underwood may refer to:

- Robert C. Underwood (1915–1988), associate justice of the Supreme Court of Illinois
- Wynn Underwood (1927–2005), associate justice of the Vermont Supreme Court

== See also ==
- Judge Underwood (disambiguation)
