= Jim Underwood (professor) =

American academic

Jim D. Underwood is a professor of management at Dallas Baptist University and the author of numerous books about business, including the best-selling More Than a Pink Cadillac: Mary Kay Inc.'s Nine Leadership Keys to Success (2003) about Mary Kay Ash.

== Education ==
- B.B.A., Texas Wesleyan University
- M.B.A., University of Dallas
- M.A., Dallas Theological Seminary
- D.B.A., United States International University

== Works ==
- The Significance Breakthrough, 2011
- Character and Success, 2011
- The Ethics Trap, 2011
- The Invisible Wall, 2010
- More Than A Pink Cadillac, 2004
- What's Your Corporate IQ?, 2004
- Competitor Intelligence, 2002
- Complexity and Paradox, 2002
- The New Corporate Strategy, 2002
- Thriving in E-Chaos, 2002
- The Significance Principle, 1998
