= Frank Underwood (English musician) =

Frank Underwood, recording session 2007

Frank Underwood is an English folk and blues musician who is also known for his work in the early music field. He lives and works in Oxfordshire, England.

== Biography ==
=== Musical activities ===
Frank Underwood learned classical piano as a boy and classical guitar in his teens. He also plays harpsichord, organ, lute and viola da gamba. He was the leader of the 1970s London-based band Windsong, which featured Annie Lennox prior to her involvement with The Tourists and fame with the Eurythmics. In the early 1980s he played guitar and sang in a folk/ragtime/blues duo in north Oxfordshire, England, with fiddler David Favis-Mortlock, performing as 'Mortlock and Underwood'. From 1983 to 1986 he was singer, guitarist and harmonica player in the 'Band of Minstrels', a four-piece acoustic folk/blues/renaissance group in north Oxfordshire.

He plays and has taught guitar, harmonica and lute. A strong interest in the cultural life of England at the time of Jane Austen led him to establish an Austen group in Oxford, and to team up with Gillian Tunley in an ensemble called 'Austentation', since augmented by the addition of Angela Mayorga on guitar and voice, and other guests.

Underwood studied lute in Oxford with Lynda Sayce and Edward FitzGibbon, and viol with Susanne Heinrich. He played lute, harpsichord and viola da gamba in Oxford-based Early Music consorts Westron Wynd and La Joysance. He has been invited over the course of several years to play keyboards at Jane Austen festivals in Bath, England.

Underwood was commissioned to write and perform music to honour the 1980s UK visit of Bishop Desmond Tutu of South Africa, and has become known as a performer at festivals and cultural events in Oxfordshire.

=== Album releases ===
He has released six CDs of mixed folk, mediaeval material, blues and his own songs, recorded at Oxford-based Folly Bridge Records, including: "In Retrospect" (2000), "Highway Songs" (2001) and "Possession" (2003).
