= List of British architects =

This list of British architects includes notable architects, civil engineers, and earlier stonemasons, from the United Kingdom and its predecessor states. People have also been included who were born outside the UK/Great Britain but who are primarily known for their practice within the UK.

== Medieval stonemasons ==
- Aelric (12th century)
- Richard Cementarius (fl. 1264–1290)
- Elias of Dereham (fl. 1188–1245)
- Gundulf of Rochester (died 1108)
- Hugh Herland (c. 1330–1411)
- Robert Janyns (fl. 1438–1464)
- John Lewyn (fl. late 14th cent.)
- William Orchard (fl. 1468–1504)
- William Ramsey (fl. 1330–1411)
- James of St. George (c. 1230–1309)
- Alan of Walsingham (died c. 1364)
- William of Sens (fl. 1174–1184)
- William the Englishman (fl. 1174–1214)
- William Wynford (fl. 1360–1405)
- Henry Yevele (c. 1320–1400)

== Renaissance, Tudor and Jacobean architects and stonemasons ==
16th and early 17th century

- John Abel (c. 1578–1675)
- Robert Adams (1540–1595)
- William Arnold (fl. 1595–1637)
- Simon Basil (fl. 1590–1615)
- Robert Janyns the Younger (fl. 1499–1506)
- Robert Lyminge (fl. 1607–1628)
- John Mylne (died 1621)
- John Mylne (died 1657)
- John Mylne (1611–1667)
- Robert Smythson (1535–1614)
- John Thorpe (c. 1565–1655)
- Robert Vertue (died 1506)
- William Vertue (died 1527)
- William Wallace (died 1631)
- John Wastell (c. 1485–1515)

== Palladian and English Baroque architects ==
Early 17th century to mid–18th century

- William Adam (1689–1748)
- Henry Aldrich (1647–1710)
- Thomas Archer (1668–1743)
- John Bastard (c. 1668–1770)
- William Bastard (c. 1689–1766)
- Henry Bell (died 1711)
- Jean de Bodt (also known as Johann von Bodt) (1670–1745)
- Richard Boyle, 3rd Earl of Burlington (1694–1753)
- Sir William Bruce (c. 1630–1710)
- Colen Campbell (1676–1729)
- Thomas Cartwright (c. 1653–1703)
- Richard Cassels (1690–1751)
- Isaac de Caus (1590–1648)
- George Clarke (1661–1736)
- William Etty (c. 1675–1734)
- Henry Flitcroft (1697–1769)
- Sir Balthazar Gerbier (1592–1663)
- James Gibbs (1682–1754)
- Sir Bernard de Gomme (1620–1685)
- Nicholas Hawksmoor (c. 1661–1736)
- Robert Hooke (1635–1703)
- John James (1673–1746)
- Inigo Jones (1573–1652)
- Christopher Kempster (1627–1715)
- William Kempster (1651–1717)
- William Kent (c. 1685–1748)
- Giacomo Leoni (1686–1746)
- Hugh May (1621–1684)
- Robert Mylne (1633–1710)
- Sir Edward Lovett Pearce (1699–1733)
- Sir Roger Pratt (1620–1684)
- Francis Smith (1672–1738)
- James Smith (c. 1645–1731)
- Nicholas Stone (1586–1647)
- William Talman (1650–1719)
- Sir John Vanbrugh (1664–1726)
- John Webb (1611–1672)
- Elizabeth, Lady Wilbraham (1632–1705)
- William Winde (c. 1645–1722)
- Sir Christopher Wren (1632–1723)

== Georgian architects ==
Mid–18th century to 1837

=== A–G ===
- James Adam (1732–1794)
- John Adam (1721–1792)
- Robert Adam (1728–1792)
- Thomas Atkinson (1799–1861)
- William Atkinson (c. 1774–1839)
- Thomas Baldwin (c. 1750–1820)
- Francis Octavius Bedford (1784–1858)
- Ignatius Bonomi (1787–1870)
- Joseph Bonomi the Elder (1739–1808)
- Matthew Brettingham (1699–1769)
- James Bridges (fl. 1757–1763)
- James Brindley (1716–1772)
- Lancelot "Capability" Brown (1716–1783)
- Decimus Burton (1800–1881)
- Charles Busby (1788–1834)
- Patrick Byrne (1783–1864)
- John Carr (1723–1807)
- Sir William Chambers (1723–1796)
- Samuel Pepys Cockerell (1754–1827)
- Lewis Nockalls Cottingham (1787–1847)
- Thomas Cooley (1740–1784)
- James Craig (1744–1795)
- George Dance the Elder (1695–1768)
- George Dance the Younger (1741–1825)
- John Donowell (fl. 1770s and 1780s)
- John Douglas (c. 1730–1778)
- Charles Dyer (1794–1848)
- Archibald Elliot (1760–1823)
- James Essex (c. 1722–1784)
- John Eveleigh (fl. 1756–1800)
- John Forbes (fl. 1825–1835)
- John Foster junior (1787–1846)
- John Foulston (1772–1841)
- James Gandon (1743–1823)
- Stephen Geary (1797–1854)
- Henry Goodridge (1797–1864)
- James Gillespie Graham (1776–1855)
- Richard Grainger (1797–1861)
- Benjamin Green (1811–1858)
- George Gwilt (1746–1807)
- John Gwynn (1713–1786)

=== H–M ===
- William Halfpenny (fl. 1723–1755)
- David Hamilton (1768–1853)
- Thomas Hamilton (1784–1858)
- Philip Hardwick (1792–1870)
- Thomas Hardwick (1752–1829)
- Thomas Harrison (1744–1829)
- Henry Herbert, 9th Earl of Pembroke (1693–1750)
- Isaac Hildreth (1741–1807)
- William Hiorne (c. 1712–1776)
- Henry Holland (1745–1806)
- Henry Inwood (1794–1843)
- William Inwood (c. 1771–1843)
- Nathaniel Ireson (1685–1769)
- Francis Johnston (1760–1829)
- John Johnson (1732–1814)
- Anthony Keck (1726–1797)
- Henry Keene (1726–1776)
- George Meikle Kemp (1795–1844)
- Richard Payne Knight (1750–1824)
- Alexander Laing (1752–1823)
- David Laing (1774–1856)
- Richard Lane (1795–1880)
- Thomas Lee (1794–1834)
- Thomas Leverton (1743–1824)
- Charles Harcourt Masters (born 1759)
- Sanderson Miller (1716–1780)
- Roger Morris (1695–1749)
- Richard Morrison (1767–1849)
- William Vitruvius Morrison (1794–1838)
- Robert Mylne (1734–1811)
- William Mylne (1734–1790)

=== N–R ===
- John Nash (1752–1835)
- James Paine (1717–1789)
- John Palmer (c. 1738–1817)
- George Papworth (c. 1738–1817)
- John Buonarotti Papworth (1795–1847)
- Thomas Paty (c. 1713–1789)
- William Paty (1758–1800)
- Joseph Pickford (1734–1782)
- John Pinch the elder (1770–1827)
- John Pinch the younger (1796–1849)
- William Henry Playfair (1790–1857)
- William Porden (c. 1755–1822)
- George Porter (died 1856)
- James Pigott Pritchett (1789–1868)
- James Pigott Pritchett junior (1830–1911)
- John Rennie the Elder (1761–1821)
- Sir John Rennie (1794–1874)
- Thomas Rickman (1776–1841)
- Nicholas Revett (1720–1804)
- Thomas Ripley (1683–1758)
- Peter Frederick Robinson (1776–1858)

=== S–Z ===
- John Sanders (1768–1828)
- Michael Searles (1750–1813)
- Henry Hake Seward (c. 1778–1848)
- John Shaw Sr. (1776–1832)
- Archibald Simpson (1790–1847)
- John Smeaton (1724–1792)
- Sir Robert Smirke (1781–1867)
- Sir John Soane (1753–1837)
- William Stark (1770–1813)
- James "Athenian" Stuart (1713–1788)
- Sir Robert Taylor (1714–1788)
- Thomas Telford (1757–1834)
- James Thornhill (c. 1676–1734)
- James Trubshaw (1777–1853)
- John Vardy (fl. 1736–1765)
- Isaac Ware (1704–1766)
- Samuel Ware (1781–1860)
- Amon Wilds (1762–1833)
- Amon Henry Wilds (1784 or 1790–1857)
- William Wilkins (1778–1839)
- John Wood, the Elder (1704–1754)
- John Wood, the Younger (1728–1782)
- Benjamin Dean Wyatt (1775–1852)
- James Wyatt (1746–1813)
- Lewis Wyatt (1777–1853)
- Philip Wyatt (died 1835)
- Samuel Wyatt (1737–1807)
- Sir Jeffry Wyattville (1766–1840)
- John Yenn (1750–1821)
- John Young (1797–1877)

== Victorian architects ==
The reign of Queen Victoria, from 1837 to 1901

=== A–G ===
- George Edward Bond (1853–1914)
- George Aitchison (1825–1910)
- Thomas Allom (1804–1872)
- Robert Rowand Anderson (1834–1921)
- George Townsend Andrews (1804–1855)
- Neville Ashbee (1852–1919)
- Hubert Austin (1845–1915)
- Sir Benjamin Baker (1840–1907)
- Joseph Henry Ball (1861–1931)
- William Swinden Barber (1832–1908)
- Sir Charles Barry (1795–1860)
- Charles Barry, Jr. (1823–1900)
- Edward Middleton Barry (1830–1880)
- George Basevi (1794–1845)
- Sir Joseph Bazalgette (1819–1891)
- John Francis Bentley (1839–1902)
- Eugenius Birch (1818–1884)
- Robert Knott Blessley (1833–1923)
- Sir Arthur Blomfield (1829–1899)
- Edward Blore (1787–1879)
- George Frederick Bodley (1827–1907)
- Arthur Bown (1851–1916)
- Henry Edwin Bown (1845–1881)
- Cuthbert Brodrick (1821–1905)
- George Washington Browne (1853–1939)
- Isambard Kingdom Brunel (1806–1859)
- David Bryce (1803–1876)
- John Chessell Buckler (1793–1894)
- Benjamin Bucknall (1833–1895)
- James Bunstone Bunning (1802–1863)
- William Burges (1827–1881)
- William Burn (1789–1870)
- William Butterfield (1814–1900)
- Basil Champneys (1842–1935)
- Thomas Edward Collcutt (1840–1924)
- Richard Cromwell Carpenter (1812–1855)
- John Henry Chamberlain (1831–1883)
- Ewan Christian (1814–1895)
- Charles Robert Cockerell (1788–1863)
- Henry Conybeare (1823–c. 1884)
- William Henry Crossland (c. 1834–1909)
- Thomas Cubitt (1788–1855)
- Lewis Cubitt (1799–1883)
- Henry Currey (1820–1900)
- Samuel Daukes (1811–1880)
- Sir Thomas Deane (1792–1871)
- Gabriel-Hippolyte Destailleur (1822–1893)
- George Devey (1820–1886)
- John Dobson (1787–1865)
- Thomas Leverton Donaldson (1795–1885)
- William Donthorne (1799–1859)
- John Douglas (1830–1911)
- Thomas Duff (1792–1848)
- Robert Rippon Duke (1817–1909)
- Arthur Edwards (1863–1927)
- Peter Ellis (1804–1888)
- Harvey Lonsdale Elmes (1813–1847)
- Sir William Emerson (1843–1924)
- Benjamin Ferrey (1810–1880)
- Captain Francis Fowke (1823–1865)
- Charles Fowler (1792–1867)
- James Fowler (1828–1892)
- Sir John Fowler (1817–1898)
- William Frame (1848–1906)
- John Gibson (1814–1892)
- Edward William Godwin (1833–1886)

=== H–M ===
- Edward Habershon (1828–1900)
- Joseph Hansom (1803–1882)
- Philip Charles Hardwick (1822–1892)
- Jesse Hartley (1780–1860)
- Henry Hare (1861–1921)
- James Harrison (1814–1866)
- Edward Haycock, Sr. (1790–1870)
- John Hayward (1808–1891)
- William Hill (1827/8–1889)
- John Henry Hirst (1826–1882)
- Arthur Hiscoe (1848–1912)
- Thomas Hopper (1776–1856)
- George Gordon Hoskins (1837–1911)
- A. J. Humbert (1822–1877)
- Sir Thomas Graham Jackson (1835–1924)
- Sir Horace Jones (1819–1887)
- Sampson Kempthorne (1809–1873)
- Henry Kennedy (c. 1814–1898)
- Edmund Kirby (1838–1920)
- Sir James Knowles (1831–1908)
- Gibson Kyle (1820–1903)
- Edward Buckton Lamb (1806–1869)
- Sir Charles Lanyon (1813–1889)
- John Leeming (1849–1931)
- William Leiper (1839–1916)
- Henry Francis Lockwood (1811–1878)
- Thomas Meakin Lockwood (1830–1900)
- Charles Lynam (1829–1921)
- William Henry Lynn (1829–1915)
- MacGibbon and Ross (founded 1872, dissolved 1914)
- George Vaughan Maddox (1802–1864)
- Alexander Marshall Mackenzie (1847–1933)
- Frank Matcham (1854–1920)
- James Maxwell (1838–1893)
- Edward John May (1853–1941)
- John Stuart McCaig (11 July 1823 – 29 June 1902)
- Alfred Meeson (1808–1885)
- Edward William Mountford (1855–1908)
- William Chadwell Mylne (1781–1863)

=== N–R ===
- William Eden Nesfield (1835–1888)
- William Adams Nicholson (1803–1853)
- Edward Ould (1852–1909)
- William Owen (1846–1910)
- Edward Graham Paley (1823–1895)
- Sir Joseph Paxton (1803–1865)
- John Loughborough Pearson (1817–1897)
- John Dick Peddie (1824–1891)
- Sir James Pennethorne (1801–1871)
- Walter Green Penty (1852–1902)
- Charles John Phipps (1835–1897)
- Hans Price (1835–1912)
- Augustus Welby Northmore Pugin (1812–1852)
- Edward Welby Pugin (1834–1875)
- William Railton (c. 1801–1877)
- Charles Reeves (1815–1866)
- David Rhind (1808–1883)
- Henry Roberts (1803–1876)
- John Thomas Rochead (1814–1878)

=== S–Z ===
- James Piers St Aubyn (1815–1895)
- James Salmon (1805–1888)
- Anthony Salvin (1799–1881)
- Sir George Gilbert Scott (1811–1878)
- George Gilbert Scott Jr. (1839–1897)
- John Oldrid Scott (1841–1913)
- John Dando Sedding (1838–1891)
- John Pollard Seddon (1827–1906)
- Edmund Sharpe (1809–1877)
- John Shaw Jr (1803–1870)
- Richard Norman Shaw (1831–1912)
- Cornelius Sherlock (c. 1824–1888)
- Isaac Thomas Shutt (1818–1879)
- Sir John Simpson (1858–1933)
- Sydney Smirke (1798–1877)
- Sidney R. J. Smith (1858–1913)
- William Smith (1831–1901)
- Robert Stephenson (1803–1859)
- George Edmund Street (1824–1881)
- Sir John Taylor (1833–1912)
- Samuel Sanders Teulon (1812–1873)
- Yeoville Thomason (1826–1901)
- Alexander "Greek" Thomson (1817–1875)
- Sir William Tite (1798–1873)
- John Thomas (1813–1862)
- Alfred Hill Thompson (1839–1874)
- Charles Harrison Townsend (1851–1928)
- Silvanus Trevail (1851–1903)
- Charles Trubshaw (1841–1917)
- Charles Tuke (1843–1893)
- Hugh Thackeray Turner (1853–1937)
- Charles Underwood (1791–1883)
- George Allen Underwood (1793–1829)
- Henry Underwood (1787–1868)
- Henry Jones Underwood (1804–1852)
- Henry Hill Vale (1831–1875)
- Thomas Verity (1837–1891)
- Lewis Vulliamy (1791–1871)
- Edward Walters (1808–1872)
- Alfred Waterhouse (1830–1905)
- Paul Waterhouse (1861–1924)
- Philip Webb (1831–1915)
- John Dodsley Webster (1840–1913)
- William White (1825–1900)
- James William Wild (1814–92)
- Charles Wilson (1810–1863)
- John Wilson Walton-Wilson (1823–1910)
- Henry Woodyer (1816–1896)
- Benjamin Woodward (1816–1861)
- Thomas Worthington (1826–1909)
- Sir Matthew Digby Wyatt (1820–1877)
- Thomas Henry Wyatt (1807–1880)
- J. & G. Young (1885–1895)
- John Young (1797–1877)
- William Young (1843–1900)

== Edwardian and inter-war period ==
1901 up to the end of the Second World War in 1945

=== A–G ===
- Theophilus Arthur Allen (1846–1929)
- Stanley Davenport Adshead (1868–1947)
- Charles Robert Ashbee (1863–1942)
- Charles Herbert Aslin (1893–1959)
- Robert Atkinson (1883–1952)
- Sir Frank Baines (1877–1933)
- Sir Herbert Baker (1862–1946)
- Peter Behrens (1868–1940)
- John Belcher (1841–1913)
- Edward Ingress Bell (1834–1913)
- Thomas Bennett (1887–1980)
- Hendrik Petrus Berlage (1856–1934)
- Sir Reginald Blomfield (1856–1942)
- Bradshaw Gass & Hope (founded 1862)
- Walter Henry Brierley (1862–1926)
- Sir John James Burnet (1857–1938)
- William Douglas Caröe (1857–1938)
- Ethel Charles (1871–1962)
- Serge Chermayeff (1900–1996)
- Wells Coates (1895–1958)
- Sir Ninian Comper (1864–1960)
- Amyas Connell (1901–1980)
- James Hoey Craigie (1870–1930)
- Robert Cromie (1855–1907)
- Peter Cummings (1879–1957)
- George Harry DeVall (1869–1956)
- Guy Dawber (1861–1938)
- George Edward Bond (1853–1914)
- Arthur Edwards (1863–1927)
- Ronald Fielding Dodd (c.1890–1958)
- H. Kempton Dyson (1880–1944)
- Vincent Esch (1876–1950)
- Reginald Fairlie (1883–1952)
- Cyril Farey (1888–1954)
- Horace Field (1861-1948)
- Edmund Fisher (1872–1918)
- Sir Banister Fletcher (1866–1953)
- Ernest Gimson (1864–1919)
- Harry Stuart Goodhart-Rendel (1887–1959)
- William Curtis Green (1882–1958)
- Sidney Greenslade (1867–1955)

=== H–M ===
- Vincent Harris (1876–1971)
- Gillian Harrison (1898–1974)
- Thomas Hastings (1860–1929)
- Stanley Heaps (1878–1962)
- George Noel Hill (1893–1985)
- Oliver Hill (1887–1968)
- Dr Harold Frank Hoar (1907–1976)
- Charles Holden (1875–1960)
- Arthur John Hope (1875–1960)
- Thomas Cecil Howitt (1889–1968)
- Charles Holloway James (1893–1953)
- R.W.H. Jones (1900–1965)
- Arthur Kenyon (1885–1969)
- Sir William Kininmonth (1904–1988)
- John Kinross (1855–1931)
- Ralph Knott (1878–1929)
- Henry Vaughan Lanchester (1863–1953)
- Archibald Leitch (1865–1939)
- William Lethaby (1857–1931)
- Sir Robert Lorimer (1864–1929)
- Berthold Lubetkin (1901–1990)
- Sir Edwin Lutyens (1869–1944)
- Charles Rennie Mackintosh (1868–1928)
- Frederick Edward Bradshaw MacManus (1903–1985)
- Elspeth Douglas McClelland (1879–1920)
- Frank Maxwell (1863–1941)
- Temple Moore (1856–1920)
- Ernest Morgan (1881–1954), Swansea Borough architect
- G. Val Myer (1883–1959)

=== N–Z ===
- Ernest Newton (1856–1922)
- George Oatley (1863–1950)
- Paul Paget (1901–1985)
- Henry Paley (1859–1946)
- F.W.J. Palmer (1864–1947)
- Arthur Joseph Penty (1875–1937)
- Stephen Rowland Pierce (1896–1966)
- Arthur Beresford Pite (1861–1934)
- John Russell Pope (1874–1937)
- Henry Price (1867–1944)
- Edward Schroeder Prior (1857–1932)
- Sir Charles Herbert Reilly (1874–1948)
- Sir Albert Richardson (1880–1964)
- W. H. Romaine-Walker (1854–1940)
- Herbert James Rowse (1887–1963)
- James Salmon (1873–1924)
- Adrian Gilbert Scott (1882–1963)
- Baillie Scott (1865–1945)
- Elisabeth Scott (1898–1972)
- Sir Giles Gilbert Scott (1880–1960)
- Arthur Shoosmith (1888–1974)
- Sir John Simpson (1858–1933)
- W. G. R. Sprague (1863–1933)
- Leonard Stokes (1858–1925)
- Walter Tapper (1861–1935)
- Thomas S. Tait (1882–1954)
- Tecton Group (founded 1932)
- Sir Alfred Brumwell Thomas (1868–1948)
- Sir Percy Thomas (1883–1969)
- Walter Aubrey Thomas (1859–1934)
- Sir Arnold Thornely (1870–1953)
- Philip Tilden (1887–1956)
- Twigg Brown Architects
- Sir Raymond Unwin (1863–1940)
- Charles Voysey (1857–1941)
- Wallis, Gilbert and Partners (founded 1914)
- Frederick Arthur Walters (1849–1931)
- George Henry Walton (1867–1933)
- Sir Aston Webb (1849–1930)
- Harry Weedon (1887–1970)
- Sir Owen Williams (1890–1969)
- Sir Clough Williams-Ellis (1883–1978)
- Edgar Wood (1860–1935)
- George Grey Wornum (1888–1957)
- Sir Percy Worthington (1864–1939)

== Post–war architects ==
1945 up to the present

=== A–M ===
- Dennis Birch (born 1931)
- Sir Patrick Abercrombie (1879–1957)
- Robert Adam (born 1948)
- Jonathan Adams (born 1961)
- Sir David Adjaye (born 1966)
- Peter Aldington (born 1933)
- Simon Allford (born 1961)
- Will Alsop (1947–2018)
- Bryan Avery (1944–2017)
- George Grenfell Baines (1908–2003)
- Basil Al Bayati (born 1946)
- Eric Bedford (1909–2001)
- Corinne Bennett (1935–2010)
- Julian Bicknell (born 1945)
- Stephen Dykes Bower (1903–1994)
- Alexander Buchanan Campbell (1914–2007)
- Sir Hugh Casson (1910–1999)
- Sir David Chipperfield (born 1953)
- Nigel Coates (born 1949)
- Edward Cullinan (1931–2019)
- Jane Duncan (born 1953)
- Bill Dunster (born 1960)
- Ralph Erskine (1914–2005)
- Sir Terry Farrell (1938–2025)
- Richard Feilden (1950–2005)
- Kathryn Findlay (1953–2014)
- Norman Foster, Baron Foster of Thames Bank (born 1935)
- Wendy Foster (1937–1989)
- Kenneth Frampton (born 1930)
- Tony Fretton (born 1945)
- Maxwell Fry (1899–1987)
- Sir Frederick Gibberd (1908–1984)
- Gerard Goalen(1918–1999)
- Ernő Goldfinger (1902–1987)
- Sir Nicholas Grimshaw (1939–2025)
- Piers Gough (born 1946)
- Dame Zaha Hadid (1950–2016)
- Denis Clarke Hall (1910–2006)
- Jonathan Hill (1958–2023)
- William Holford, Baron Holford (1907–1975)
- Sir Michael Hopkins (1935–2023)
- Patricia Hopkins (born 1942)
- Glenn Howells (born 1961)
- Geoffrey Jellicoe (1900–1996)
- Percy Johnson-Marshall (1915–1993)
- Edward Jones (born 1939)
- Shiu-Kay Kan (born 1951)
- Eric Kuhne (1951–2016)
- Sir Denys Lasdun (1914–2001)
- Gertrude Leverkus (1899–1976)
- Richard Llewelyn-Davies, Baron Llewelyn-Davies (1912–1981)
- Owen Luder (1928–2021)
- Berthold Lubetkin (1901–1990)
- Eric Lyons (1912–1980)
- Kate Macintosh (born 1937)
- Robert Hamilton Macintyre (1940–1997)
- Rick Mather (1937–2013)
- Sir Robert Matthew (1906–1975)
- Sir Leslie Martin (1908–1999)
- Sir Edward Maufe (1883–1974)
- John Melvin (born 1935)
- Peter Moro (1911–1998)
- Hidalgo Moya (1920–1994)
- Richard Murphy (born 1955)

=== N–Z ===
- John Outram (born 1934)
- George Pace (1915–1975)
- Claud Phillimore (1911–1994)
- Francis Pollen (1926–1987)
- Sir Philip Powell (1921–2003)
- Ernest Prestwich (1889–1977)
- Brian Ring
- Ian Ritchie (born 1947)
- James A. Roberts (1922–2019)
- Howard Morley Robertson (1888–1963) – president of the Royal Institute of British Architects from 1952 to 1954
- David Roberts (1911–1982)
- Richard Rogers, Baron Rogers of Riverside (1933–2021)
- Su Rogers (born 1939)
- Deborah Saunt
- Mervyn Seal (born 1930)
- Hugh Segar "Sam" Scorer (1923–2003)
- Richard Seifert (1910–2001)
- Sir Peter Shepheard (1913–2002)
- Richard Sheppard (1910–1982)
- Ken Shuttleworth (born 1952)
- Charlotte Skene-Catling (born 1965)
- Ian Simpson (born 1955)
- Alison Smithson (1928–1993)
- Peter Smithson (1923–2003)
- Ivor Smith (1926–2018)
- Sir Basil Spence (1907–1976)
- Sir James Stirling (1926–1992)
- Rosemary Stjernstedt (1912–1998)
- Quinlan Terry (born 1937)
- Ralph Tubbs (1912–1996)
- John Wells-Thorpe (1928–2019)
- Michael Wilford (1938–2023)
- Desmond Williams
- Keith Williams (born 1958)
- Sir Colin St John Wilson (1922–2007)
- John Winter (1930–2007)
- Georgie Wolton (1934–2021)
- Peter Womersley (1923–1993)
- Jonathan Woolf (1961–2015)

== 18th, 19th and 20th-century British and Irish architects who emigrated ==
=== A–M ===
- Edmund Anscombe (1874–1948) (New Zealand)
- John Lee Archer (1791–1852) (Australia)
- Benjamin Backhouse (1829–1904) (Australia)
- William Barnett Armson (1834–1883) (New Zealand)
- Herbert Baker (1862–1946) (South Africa, though he returned to England in 1913)
- James Barnet (1827–1904) (Australia)
- Edward Bartley (1839–1919) (New Zealand)
- Claude Batley (1879–1956) (India)
- John Begg (1866–1937) (India)
- Edward H. Bennett (1874–1954) (USA)
- James Blackburn (1803–1854) (Australia)
- Edmund Blacket (1817–1883)(Australia)
- C.A. "Peter" Bransgrove (1914–1966) (Tanganyika/Tanzania)
- Charles Cameron (1843–1812) (Russia)
- John James Clark (1838–1915) (Australia)
- Nicholas J. Clayton (1840–1916) (USA)
- Frederick de Jersey Clere (1856–1952) (New Zealand)
- Josiah Condor (1852–1920) (Japan)
- Frederick William Cumberland (1821–1881) (Canada)
- Peter Dickinson (1925–1961) (Canada)
- John Donaldson (1854–1941) (USA)
- John Ewart(1788–1856) (Canada)
- George Grant Elmslie (1869–1952) (USA)
- Ralph Erskine (1914–2005) (Sweden)
- Thomas Forrester (1838–1907) (New Zealand)
- Thomas Fuller (1823–1898) (Canada)
- Alfred Giles (1853–1920) (USA)
- Francis Greenway (1777–1837) (Australia)
- Samuel Hannaford (1835–1911) (USA)
- Alexander Nelson Hansell (1857–1940) (Japan)
- William Critchlow Harris (1854–1913) (Canada)
- John Haviland (1792–1852) (USA)
- John Cyril Hawes (1876–1956) (Australia)
- Peter Harrison (1716–1775) (USA)
- Peter Hemingway (1929–1995) (Canada)
- James Hoban (c.1758–1831) (USA)
- Talbot Hobbs (1864–1938) (Australia)
- Herbert Horne (1864–1916) (Italy)
- I. Vernon Hill (1872–1904) (USA)
- William Jay (1792–1837) (USA)
- Richard Roach Jewell (1810–1891) (Australia)
- Gordon Kaufmann (1888–1949) (USA)
- Henry Bowyer Lane (1817–1878) (Canada)
- Benjamin Latrobe (1764–1820) (USA)
- Robert Lawson (1833–1902) (New Zealand)
- Gordon W. Lloyd (1832–1905) (USA)
- John M. Lyle (1872–1945) (Canada)
- Adam Menelaws (1748–1831) (Russia)
- Charles Donagh Maginnis (1867–1955) (USA)
- William Mason (1810–1897) (New Zealand)
- Benjamin Mountfort (1825–1898) (New Zealand)

=== N–Z ===
- Percy Erskine Nobbs (1875–1964) (Canada)
- John Notman (1810–1865) (USA)
- John Ostell (1813–1892) (Canada)
- John C. Parkin (1922–1988) (Canada)
- John Parkinson (1861–1935) (USA)
- John A. Pearson (1867–1940) (Canada)
- Cecil Ross Pinsent (1884–1963) (Italy)
- Robert John Pratt (1907–2003) (Canada)
- Thomas Podmore (1859–1948) (USA)
- Francis Rattenbury (1867–1935) (Canada)
- Thomas Rowe (1829–1899) (Australia)
- Frederick Preston Rubidge (1806–1897) (Canada)
- Robert Russell (1808–1900) (Australia)
- Robert Tor Russell (1880–1972) (India)
- Conrad Sayce (1888–1935) (Australia)
- Thomas Seaton Scott (1826–1895) (Canada)
- Arthur Shoosmith (1888–1974) (India)
- Frank Worthington Simon (1863–1933) (Canada)
- Eden Smith (1858–1949) (Canada)
- Robert Smith (1722–1777) (USA)
- Frederick William Stevens (1847–1900) (India)
- George Strickland Kingston (1807–1880) (Australia)
- John Sulman (1849–1934) (Australia)
- Florence Mary Taylor (1879–1969) (Australia)
- James Chapman-Taylor (1878–1958) (New Zealand)
- George Temple-Poole (1856–1934)(Australia)
- Frederick Thatcher (1814–1890) (New Zealand)
- William Thomas (c. 1799–1860) (Canada)
- George Troup (1863–1941) (New Zealand)
- Kivas Tully (1820–1905) (Canada)
- Richard Upjohn (1802–1878) (USA)
- Henry Vaughan (1845–1917) (USA)
- Calvert Vaux (1824–1895) (USA)
- John Verge (1788–1861) (Australia)
- Richard A. Waite (1848–1911) (USA)
- William Wardell (1824–1899) (Australia)
- John Cliffe Watts (1786–1873) (Australia)
- Charles Webb (1821–1898) (Australia)
- Leslie Wilkinson (1882–1973) (Australia)
- George Wittet (1878–1926) (India)
- Charles Wyatt (1758–1813) (India)

== See also ==
- Architecture of the United Kingdom
- List of architects
- List of British architecture firms
- List of British people
- List of historic buildings and architects of the United Kingdom
- List of Oxford architects
- Royal Incorporation of Architects in Scotland
- Royal Institute of British Architects
- Royal Society of Architects in Wales
