= List of Oxford architects =

This list of Oxford architects includes architects and architectural practices that have designed buildings in the university city of Oxford, England.

== A ==
- Ahrends, Burton and Koralek
- ADAM Architecture
- Adrian James Architects
- Henry Aldrich
- William Arnold

== B ==
- Herbert Baker
- Charles Bell
- John Billing
- Arthur Blomfield
- Reginald Blomfield
- George Frederick Bodley
- Edward George Bruton
- Charles Buckeridge
- Herbert Tudor Buckland
- John Chessell Buckler
- William Burges
- William Butterfield

== C ==
- Walter Cave
- Basil Champneys
- George Clarke
- Charles Robert Cockerell
- Frederick Codd
- Ninian Comper
- Lewis Nockalls Cottingham

== D ==
- T. Lawrence Dale
- Thomas Newenham Deane
- Edwin Dolby
- Philip Dowson
- Harry Drinkwater

== E ==
- Raymond Erith

== F ==
- T. P. Figgis
- Edmund Fisher
- Norman Foster

== G ==
- Thomas Garner
- James Gibbs
- John Gibbs
- Gillespie, Kidd & Coia
- John Gwynn

== H ==
- Joseph Hansom
- Henry Hare
- Daniel Harris
- Austen Harrison
- Nicholas Hawksmoor
- John Hayward
- William Haywood
- Thomas Holt
- Geddes Hyslop

== J ==
- Thomas Graham Jackson
- Arne Jacobsen
- Robert Janyns
- Edward Jones with Jeremy Dixon

== K ==
- Henry Keene

== L ==
- Henry Vaughan Lanchester
- Thomas Arthur Lodge
- Edwin Lutyens

== M ==
- Richard MacCormac
- Leslie Martin
- Rick Mather
- Edward Maufe
- Walter Edward Mills
- MJP Architects
- Harry Wilkinson Moore
- Temple Moore
- Alfred Mardon Mowbray
- Percy Richard Morley Horder
- Hidalgo Moya

== O ==
- Original Field of Architecture
- William Orchard

== P ==
- John Loughborough Pearson
- John Plowman
- Demetri Porphyrios
- Philip Powell
- Augustus Pugin

== R ==
- Albert Richardson
- Daniel Robertson
- Clapton Crabb Rolfe

== S ==
- Stephen Salter
- Samuel Lipscomb Seckham
- George Gilbert Scott
- George Gilbert Scott Jr.
- Giles Gilbert Scott
- John Simpson
- Alison and Peter Smithson
- Sow Space
- J. J. Stevenson
- James Stirling
- Nicholas Stone
- George Edmund Street

== T ==
- Samuel Sanders Teulon

== U ==
- Henry Jones Underwood

== W ==
- Edward Prioleau Warren
- Alfred Waterhouse
- Paul Waterhouse
- Edward Doran Webb
- WilkinsonEyre
- William Wilkinson
- Colin St John Wilson
- Jake Aiken Winter
- Benjamin Woodward
- Hubert Worthington
- Thomas Worthington
- Christopher Wren
- James Wyatt
- William Wynford

== See also ==
- List of British architects
