= George Harry DeVall =

British Architect

George Harry Devall (1869–1956) was a British architect, who worked in Birmingham in the late nineteenth and early twentieth centuries, contributing much to the streetscape of the city. He was a contemporary of J. L. Ball, William Bidlake, Herbert Tudor Buckland, W. A. Harvey, and William Haywood, all of whom lived in Edgbaston and had architect practices in the city.

== Biography ==
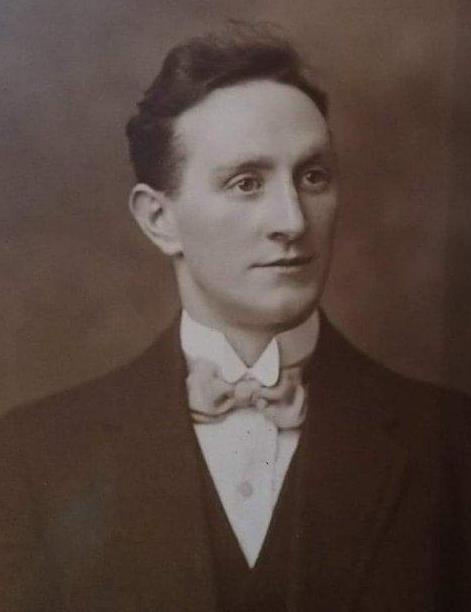
George Harry Devall, circa 1895

George Harry Devall (sometimes DuVall or DeVall) (1869–1956) practised from 1895 until he retired to Wales in 1934. Devall was a prolific architect who made a significant contribution to the quality of the built environment in Edgbaston, Harborne, Rotton Park and Winson Green areas of Birmingham.

George Devall was born in Birmingham in 1869, the eldest son of George and Phoebe Devall, who originally came from Dudley, Worcestershire. His father was a pawnbroker, and in 1891 (when George was 12) the family was living in Dudley Road, Birmingham . The area that George grew up in would be a stone's throw from the area where he would ultimately make his living. In the 1891 census he is shown as an Architect's Clerk, living with his father in Heath Street, Birmingham and by 1895 he is listed for the first time in Kelly's Directory of Birmingham as an Architect and Surveyor. In 1906 Devall was elected an associate member of the Birmingham Architectural Association. The association, which was affiliated to the Royal Institute of British Architects, was founded in 1873 to promote the union and professional integrity of architects and for the general advancement of architecture in Warwickshire, Staffordshire, Shropshire, Herefordshire and Worcestershire. In 1921, at the age of 62, Devall became a Fellow of the association and remained so until 1925, when he retired from the association.

A large number of properties were built by him during his professional life, many of which are large detached and semi-detached villa residences for the Victorian and Edwardian middle-classes. However, he also designed a number of attractive terraced houses in Winson Green, Edgbaston and Harborne, most notably War Lane, Hartledon Road and Victoria Road in Harborne, all of which are still extant. In these latter three roads, he uses highly decorative terracotta to include columns, corinthian capitals, pediments and cartouches. Evidence of his productive career can be seen in his list of works, which lists the planning applications submitted to Birmingham City Council by him between 1895 and 1912. After 1911 his attentions appear to have switched from private dwelling houses and focused more on the commercial, as many of the planning applications subsequent to 1911 relate to motor houses, shops, manufactories and alterations.

Much of his work of the larger villa style is concentrated in the Edgbaston roads of Melville Road, Clarendon Road, Montague Road, Gillott Road, Rotton Park Road and City Road (the latter two being notable for the large number of houses he designed there). His own house, where he lived from 1901 to 1934 at 152 Rotton Park Road, also survives and is a very attractive Edwardian detached villa. He also designed houses on individual plots in Edgbaston on Hagley Road, Lordswood Road, Portland Road and Somerset Road, many of which are still extant, but some, despite being in conservation areas, are at risk of demolition.

Devall retired to Wales in 1934 and died in Porthcawl in 1956. He is buried at St John the Baptist Church, Porthcawl.

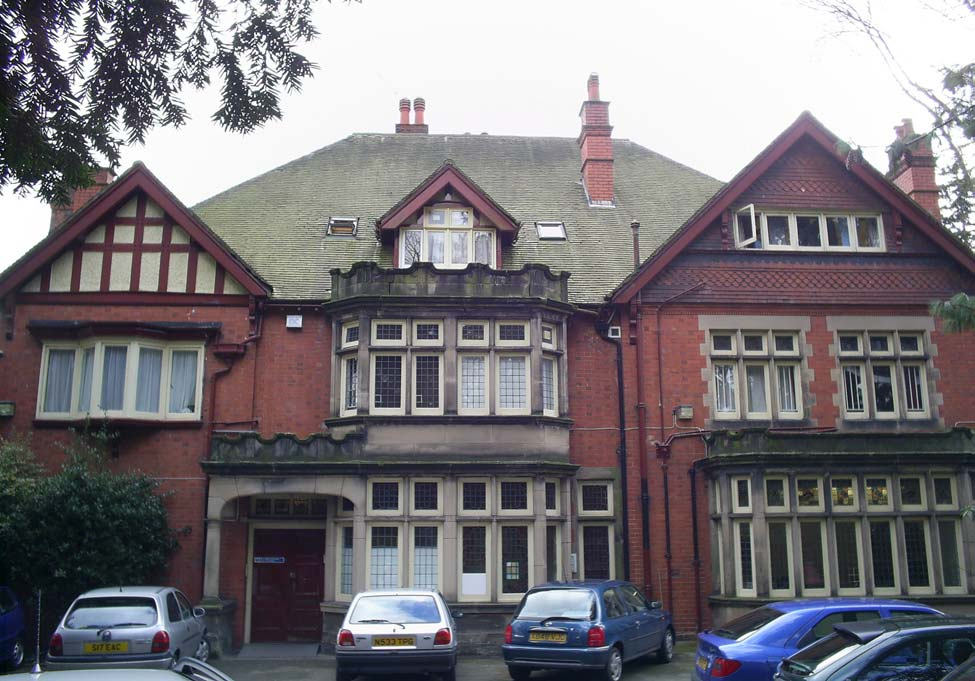
Somerset Grange, Edgbaston

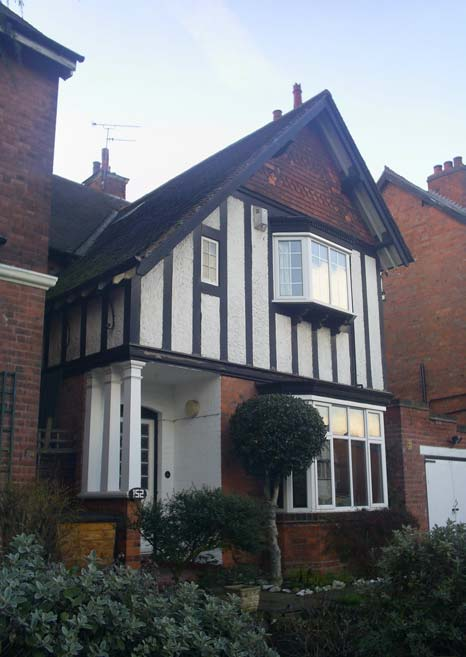
152 Rotton Park Road, Edgbaston (Devall's own home)

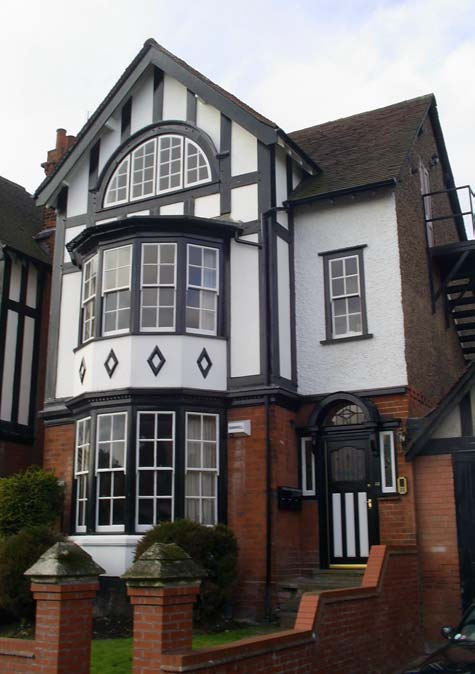
22 Wheatsheaf Road, Edgbaston

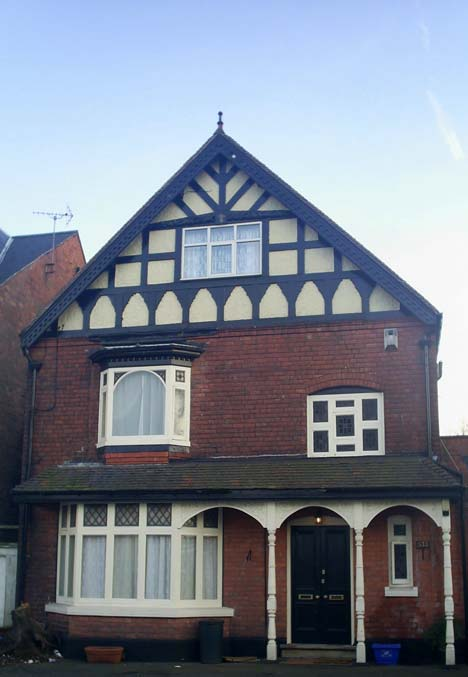
532 City Road, Edgbaston

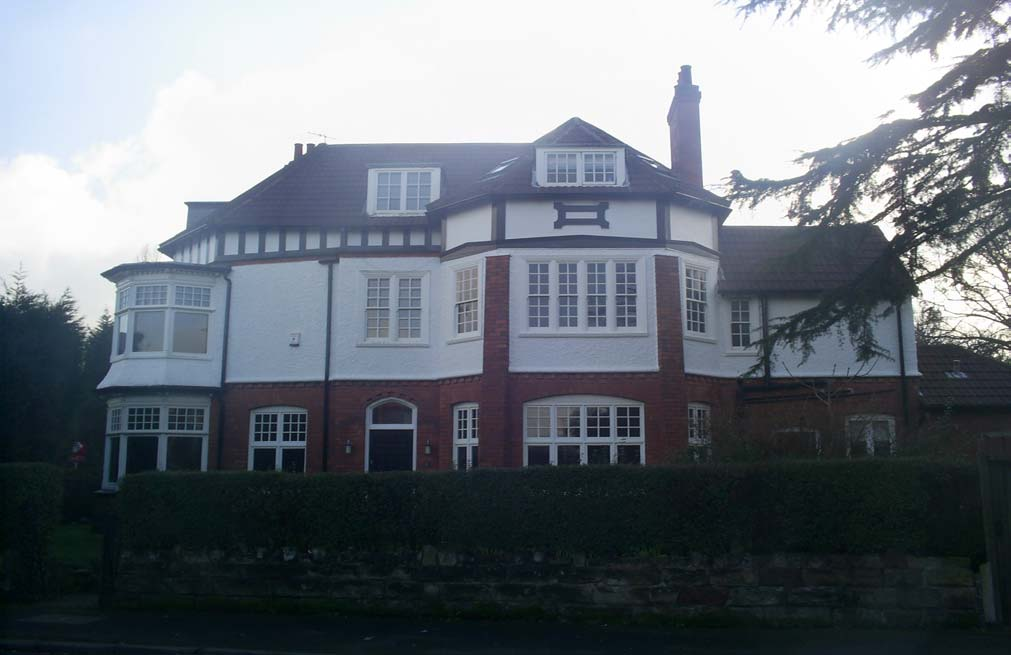
2 Vernon Road, Edgbaston

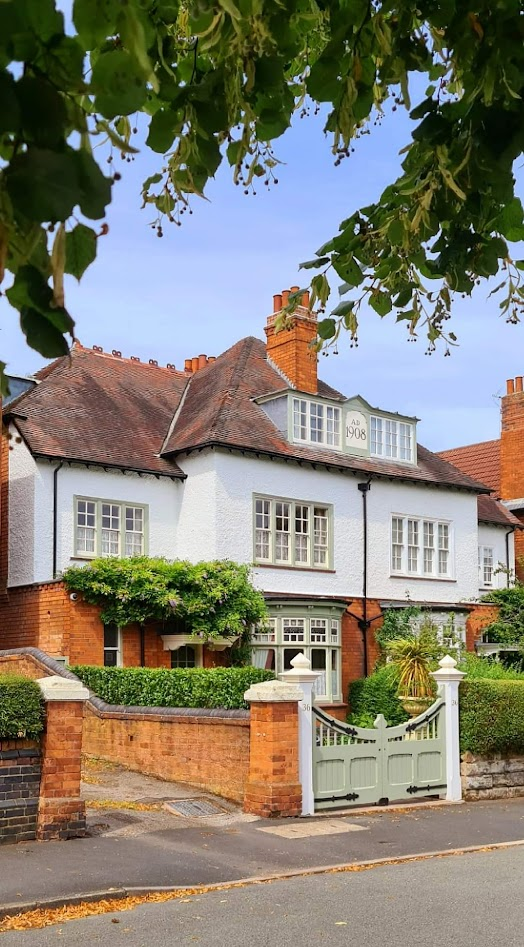
36 Clarendon Road, Edgbaston

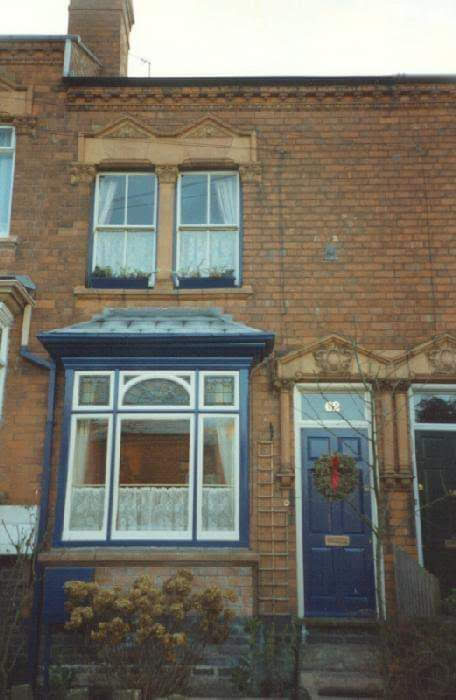
62 Hartledon Road, Harborne

== Built works ==
This list is compiled from research at the Birmingham City Council Archive, showing the date of the application and the planning application reference number (images referenced in this article in bold):

Date	Ref.	Details
25‑Apr‑1895	10919	House at Gillott Road, Edgbaston
22‑Dec‑1896	12486	4 houses at Rotton Park Road, Edgbaston
15‑Dec‑1896	12463	2 houses at Gillott Road, Edgbaston
19‑Jan‑1897	12531	4 houses at City Road, Edgbaston
07‑May‑1897	12935	House(s) at City Road, Edgbaston
31‑Jul‑1897	13157	5 houses at Portland Road, Edgbaston – near to York Road
21‑Sep‑1897	13276	2 houses at Rotton Park Road, Edgbaston
21‑Sep‑1897	13276	2 houses on the corner of Rotton Park Road and City Road, Edgbaston
27‑Sep‑1897	13294	4 houses at Gillott Road, Edgbaston
29‑Jan‑1898	13596	Sloe Lane
24‑Feb‑1898	13671	232 & 234 Rotton Park Road, Edgbaston
19‑Mar‑1898	13751	6 houses at Gillott Road, Edgbaston
19‑Mar‑1898	13752	Shops at St Mary Street
07‑May‑1898	13925	40 houses at Edgbaston Road, Cromer Road and Tudor Street, Winson Green
19‑Mar‑1898	13967	Houses at City Road, Edgbaston
23‑Jun‑1898	14056	31 houses at Constance Road and Edward Road
25‑Oct‑1898	14119	1 house at Melville Road, Edgbaston
18‑Jun‑1898	14165	6 houses at City Road, Edgbaston
20‑Aug‑1898	14173	6 houses at Rotton Park Road and Gillott Road, Edgbaston
21‑Sep‑1898	14254	1 house at Lordswood Road, Harborne
22‑Sep‑1898	14342	4 houses at Carlisle Street, Winson Green
05‑Nov‑1898	14380	9 houses at James Turner Street, Winson Green
07‑Jan‑1899	14494	10 houses at City Road, Edgbaston
07‑Jan‑1899	14495	1 house at 266 Rotton Park Road, Edgbaston
15‑Feb‑1899	14598	1 house at Rotton Park Road, Edgbaston for Ada Devall
28‑Apr‑1899	14800	2 houses at 32 and 34 Melville Road, Edgbaston
01‑May‑1899	14805	1 house at 62 Portland Road, Edgbaston for Mr (later Cllr Walthall
15‑Jun‑1899	14921	2 houses at 154/156 Rotton Park Road, Edgbaston
23‑Aug‑1899	15067	1 house at Hagley Road, Edgbaston for Ebeneezer J. Bradley (D)
18‑Oct‑1899	15184	4 houses at Franklin Street and Wellington Street, Winson Green
**04‑Nov‑1899**	**15230**	**1 house at 334 Hagley Road, Edgbaston for his brother-in-law, Thomas Sanders (D)**
21‑Nov‑1899	15267	10 houses at Gillott Road and proposed new road, Edgbaston
05‑Dec‑1899	15298	8 houses at Gillott Road, Edgbaston
27‑Jul‑1900	15738	5 houses at Beaconsfield Road
04‑Sep‑1900	15802	1 house at the corner of City Road and Selwyn Road
09‑Jan‑1900	15369	7 houses at Gillott Road and Rotton Park Road, Edgbaston
30‑Oct‑1900	15894	13 houses at Norman Street
09‑Jan‑1900	15369	Houses at Rotton Park Road and Gillott Road, Edgbaston
11‑Jul‑1900	15718	2 houses at 245/247 Rotton Park Road, Edgbaston for Mrs Podmore
09‑Jan‑1901	15998	37 houses at John Turner Street, Eva Road and Perrott Street, Winson Green
12‑Jan‑1901	16002	37 houses at Edward Road, Eva Road, Perrott Street and John Turner Street
**22‑Jan‑1901**	**16335**	**House called “Somerset Grange” at 26 Somerset Road, Edgbaston for Walter Smith Bradley**
**25‑Jan‑1901**	**16684**	**1 house at 152 Rotton Park Road, Edgbaston for Mr G H Devall**
18‑Mar‑1901	16772	2 houses at “Woodcote” 369 Hagley Road, Edgbaston for Mr John Bradley (D)
11‑Jul‑1901	16995	5 houses at Winson Street and Tudor Street, Winson Green
14‑Aug‑1901	17001	4 houses at Bankes Road, Winson Green
04‑Oct‑1901	17072	4 houses at Crabtree Road, Winson Green
08‑Oct‑1901	17079	8 houses at Beeton Road, Winson Green
**20‑Dec‑1901**	**17200**	**79 houses at Hartledon Road and 49 houses at Victoria Road and 30 houses at War Lane**
26‑Jan‑1903	17243	Brewery
02‑Apr‑1903	17382	1 house at Cromer Road
**09‑Jun‑1903**	**17502**	**1 house at 336 Hagley Road, Edgbaston for Mr Samuel White**
01‑Jul‑1903	17567	1 house at Mansell Road, Winson Green
29‑Dec‑1903	17805	15 houses at Tudor Street, Winson Green
26‑Jan‑1904	17841	Stabling at Victoria Road
19‑Mar‑1905	18539	2 houses at Raglan Road, Winson Green
19‑Mar‑1905	18545	71 houses at Rotton Park Road
19‑Mar‑1905	18577	23 houses and 1 shop at War Lane, Harborne
08‑Feb‑1906	19008	6 houses at Gillott Road, Edgbaston
09‑Jan‑1906	19013	Manufactory at Hampton Street
05‑Jul‑1906	19279	2 houses at 8/10 Fountain Road, Edgbaston for W. Reed
07‑Jul‑1906	19288	10 houses at War Lane, Harborne
11‑May‑1907	19743	14 houses at Selwyn Road, Edgbaston
**19‑Jul‑1907**	**19854**	**3 houses at 36/38 Clarendon Road and 2 Vernon Road, Edgbaston**
20‑Sep‑1907	19927	2 houses at 18 and 20 Wheatsheaf Road, Edgbaston
**28‑Dec‑1907**	**20061**	**1 house at 22 Wheatsheaf Road, Edgbaston for Mr L. Turner.**
22‑Feb‑1908	20133	3 houses at Montague Road, Edgbaston
14‑Apr‑1908	20195	1 house at 160 Portland Road, Edgbaston for Mr C. J. Hoare
11‑Apr‑1908	20210	3 houses at 119–123 Rotton Park Road, Edgbaston
02‑May‑1908	20242	8 houses at Grove Street
01‑Jul‑1908	20338	8 houses at 119–133 Rotton Park Road, Edgbaston (replacing 20210)
28‑Sep‑1908	20478	1 house at 435 Hagley Road, Edgbaston called “Mandalay” for Mr William S. Sheldon
27‑Mar‑1909	20776	1 house at Lee Bank Road, Edgbaston
10‑Mar‑1910	21343	8 houses at Don Street
22‑Jul‑1910	21630	3 cottages at Metchley Lane, Harborne next to Sportsman P.H. for Mr S. Allen
27‑Aug‑1910	21677	3 houses at 21–25 Metchley Lane, Harborne resubmitted as above (No. 25 demolished)
17‑Oct‑1911	23574	1 house on the corner of Rotton Park Road and Selwyn Road, Edgbaston

== See also ==
- Architecture of Birmingham
