= Sōraku-en =

Gardens in Chūō-ku, Kobe, Japan

Sōraku-en 相楽園
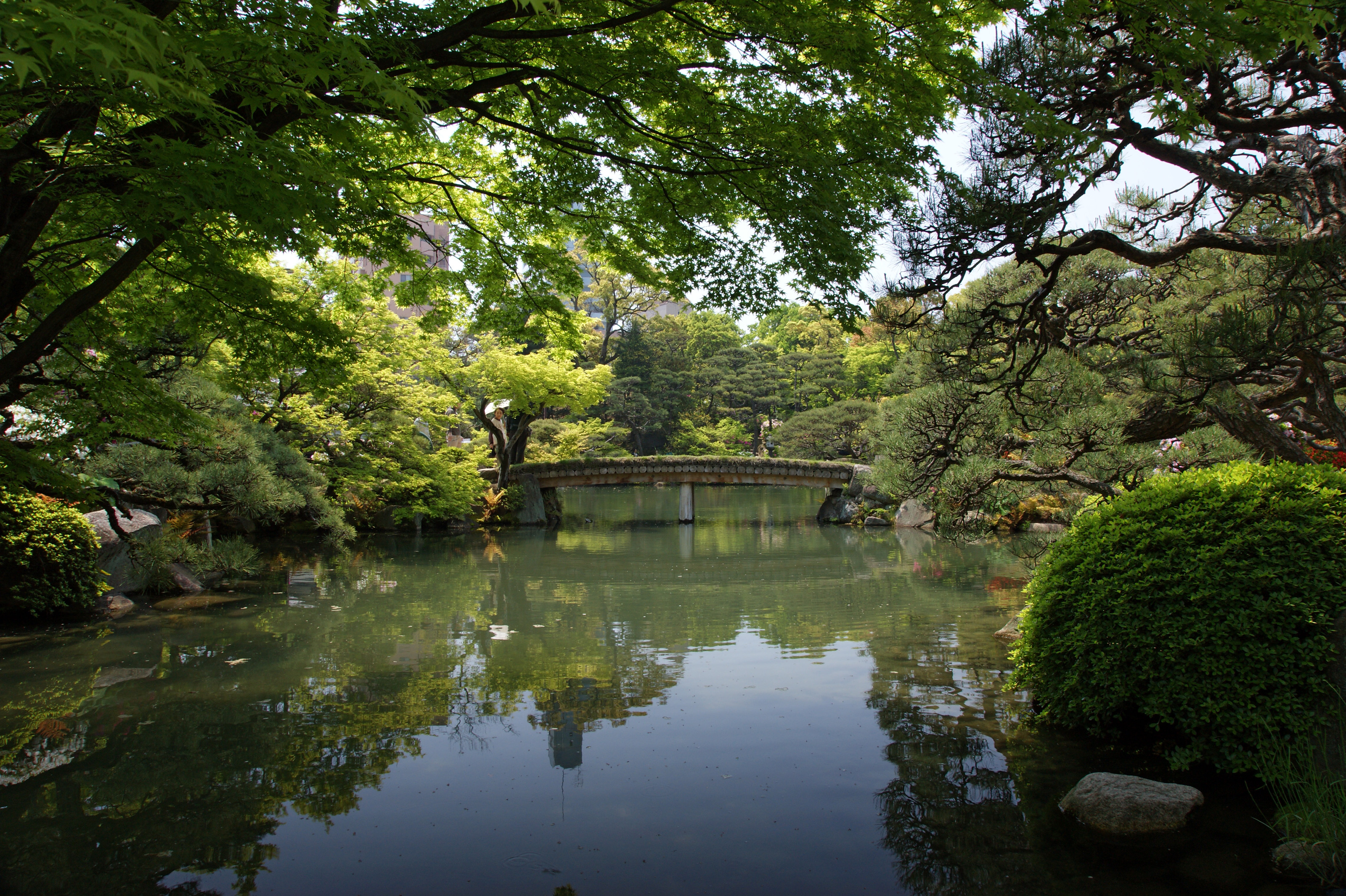
- Interactive map of Sōraku-en 相楽園
- Location: 5-3-1, Nakayamate-dōri, Chūō-ku, Kobe, Hyōgo Prefecture, Japan
- Coordinates: 34°41′33″N 135°10′54″E
- Opened: 1941
- Owner: Kobe City
- Website: www.sorakuen.com (jp)

The gardens of Sōraku-en (相楽園) are in Chūō-ku, Kobe, Japan. Formerly attached to the Taishō-era residence of Kodera Yasujirō, ownership passed to the city of Kobe in 1941. Since then they have been open to the public. Most of the former residence was destroyed in the Pacific War; the stables of 1907 survived and have been designated an Important Cultural Property.

It is one of the few historical Japanese gardens that exists within Kobe city. It adopts a "chisen kaiyu shiki (池泉回遊式)”, style which is a style of garden that features a path around a pond. The giant camphor tree standing inside the garden is considered one of the most iconic elements of the site. This tree is known to have been there before the original residence of Kodera Yasujirō was built.

In the gardens are the former Hassam Residence, built by the English architect Alexander Nelson Hansell in 1902 and relocated to its current site in 1963 (ICP); an Edo-period building shaped like a boathouse, dating from 1682-1704 (ICP); a tea house; and a stroll garden.

In 2006 Sōraku-en was registered as a Place of Scenic Beauty. The gardens take their name from a passage of the I Ching.

== Gallery ==
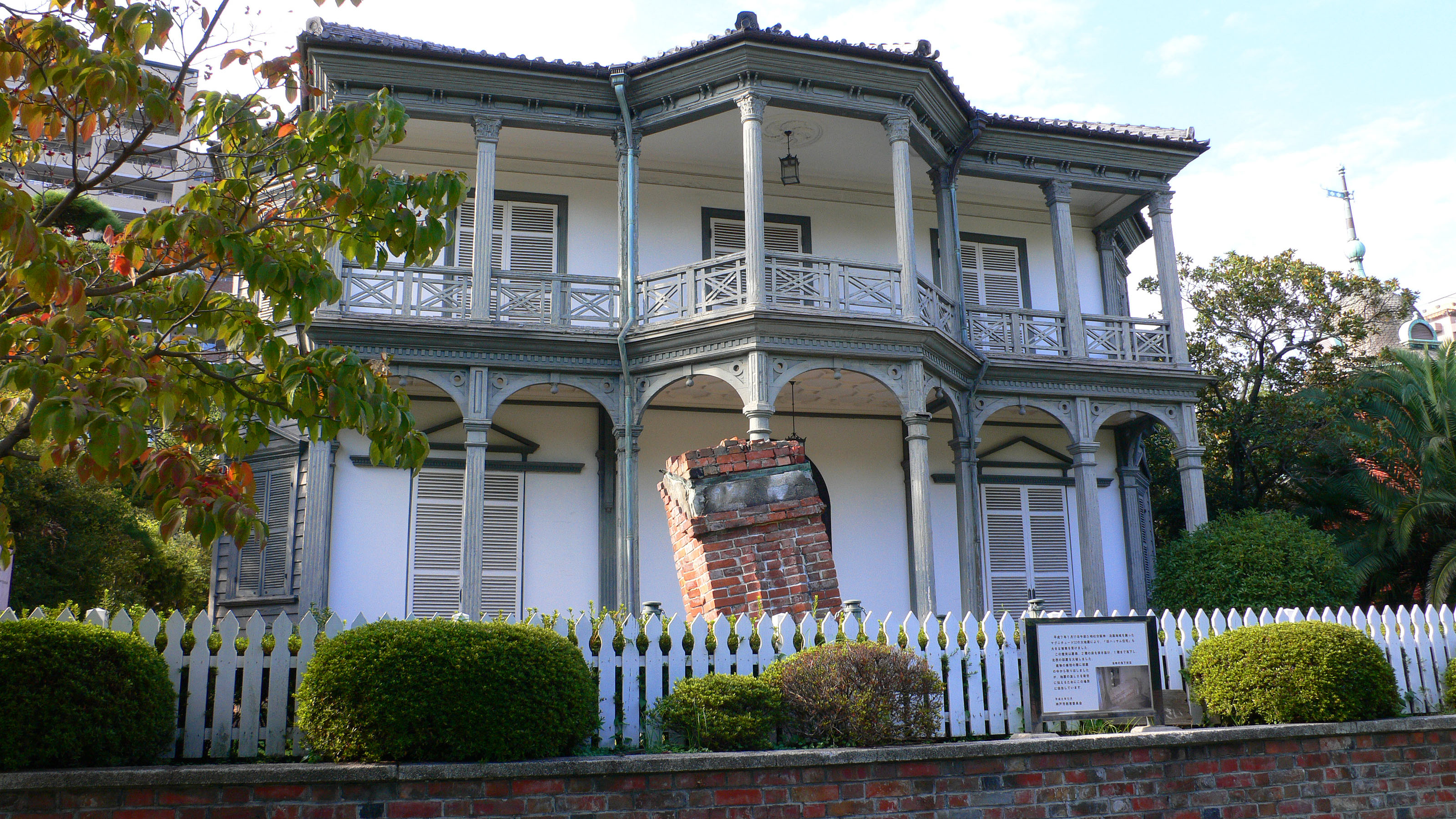
Former Hassam Residence

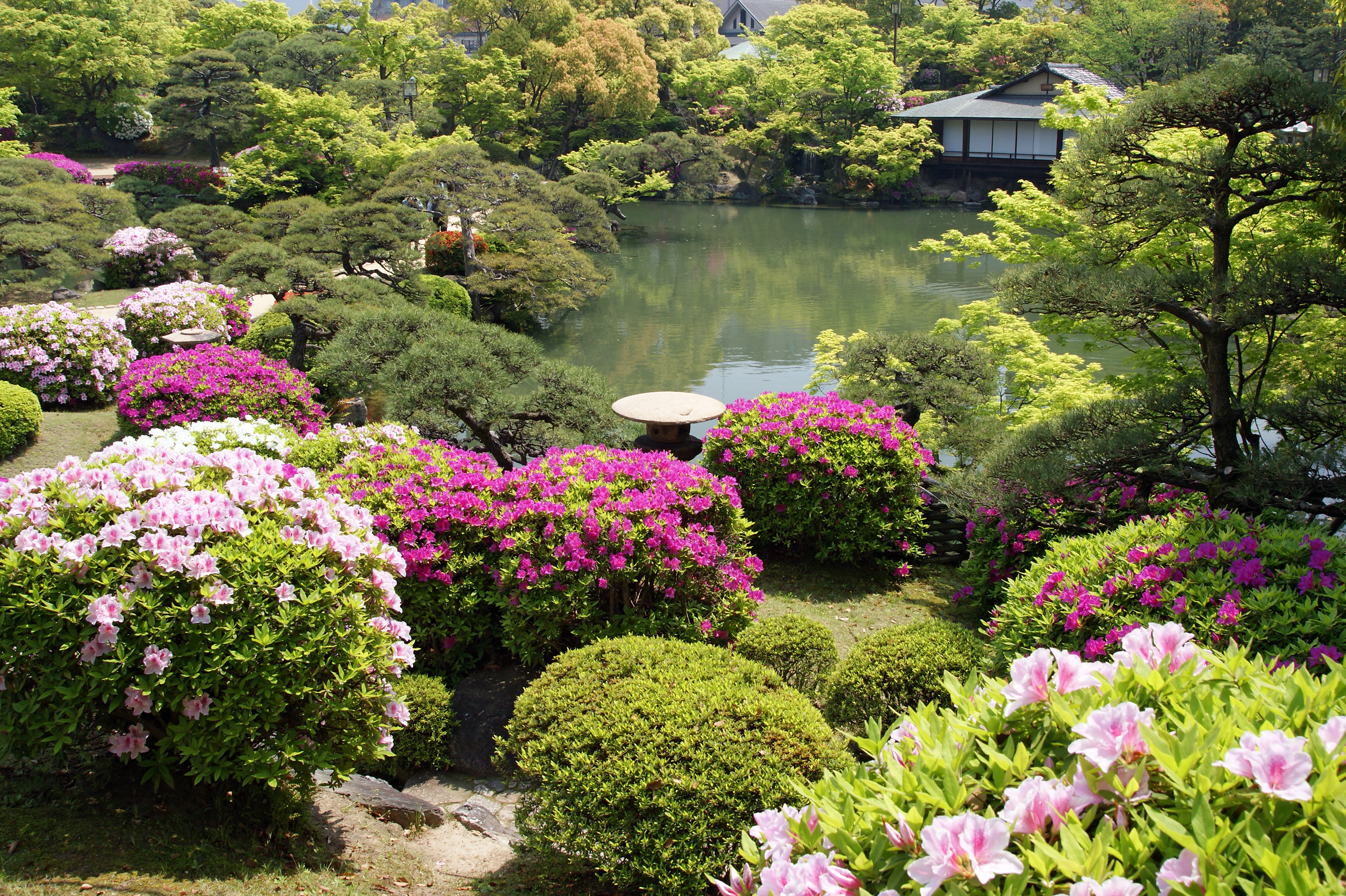
Rhododendron garden

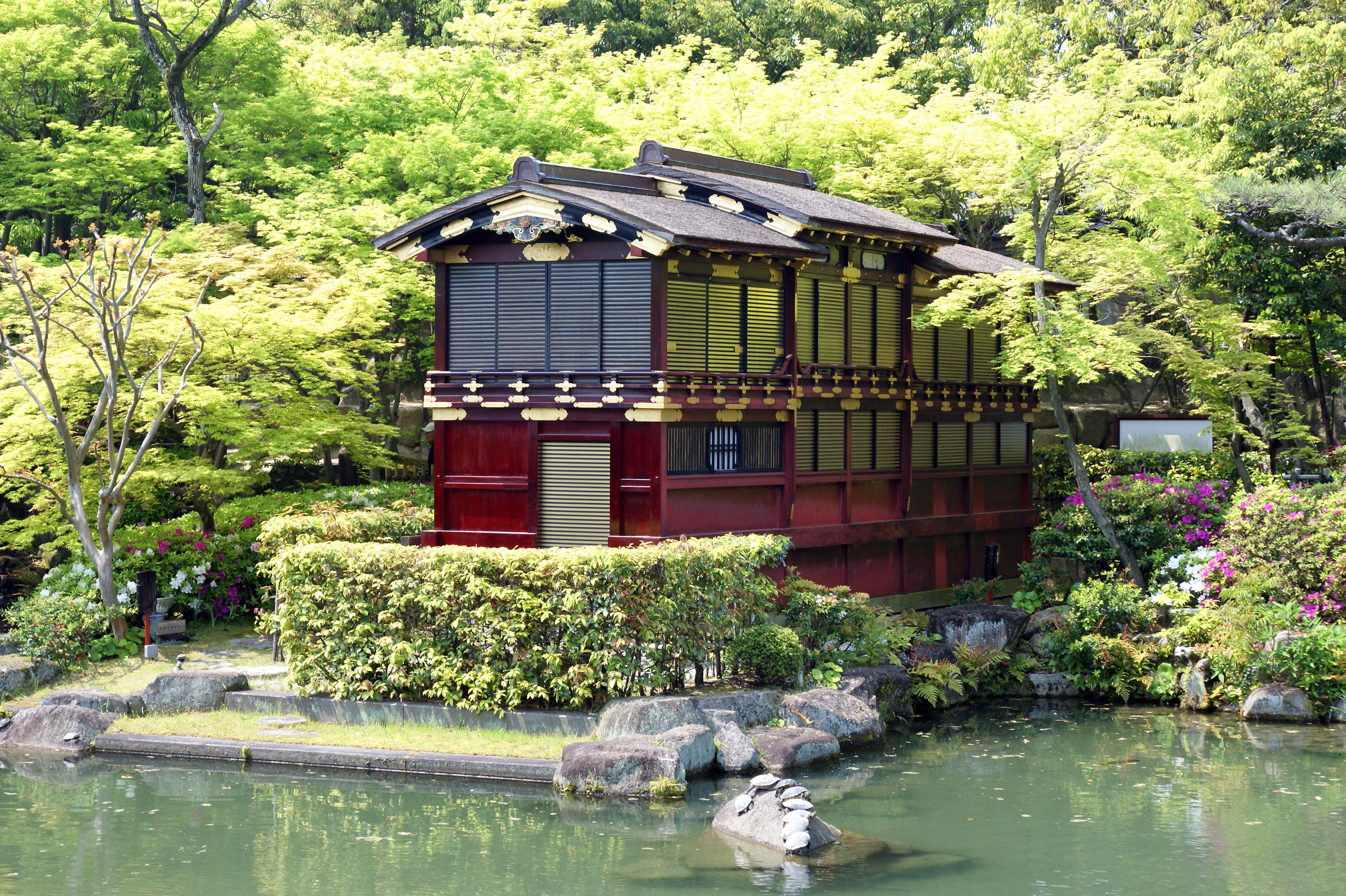
Boathouse-shaped building

== See also ==
- Nunobiki Herb Garden
- Rokkō Alpine Botanical Garden
