= Aelric =

Northumbrian mason

Aelric (or Aelricus) was a Northumbrian mason, probably of Saxon origin, known for his work during the 12th century on the building of Dunfermline Abbey.

A document produced between 1153 and 1156 granted the lands of Ledmacduuegil by Malcolm IV of Scotland to Dunfermline Abbey and records him as "master, mason". That land became known as Maistertoun or Masterton, with reference to Aelric.
