= Henry Underwood (architect, born 1787) =

Henry Underwood (1787 – 8 March 1868) was an architect, initially working in Cheltenham, who later moved to Bath.

His most important building in Bath was the Swedenborgian New Jerusalem Church in the Greek Revival style (now the Institute of Public Care. In 1829 he worked on Penpont, Brecon Beacons.

His brothers Charles Underwood and George Allen Underwood were also architects. Henry Underwood died in Bath, aged 80.
