= Arthur Kenyon =

Arthur W Kenyon (1885–1969) was an English architect.

Kenyon was articled to Henry Leslie Paterson of Sheffield in the early 1900s. In 1906 he moved to the office of Niven and Wigglesworth as assistant. He took over David Barclay Niven's interest in the practice after it dissolved in 1926.

Kenyon worked with Louis de Soissons at Welwyn Garden City for eighteen years designing many of the houses there. He undertook development work on pre-fabricated houses during the Second World War and after the war specialised in town planning.

== Works ==
- 1934 16 houses in cul-de-sac on SW side of Attimore Rd, Welwyn
- 1936-7 St Alban's Church, Norwood Drive, Harrow
- 1955 St Barnabas' Church, Pound Hill, Crawley
