= Birmingham Architectural Association =

The Birmingham Architectural Association (BAA), known between 1933 and 1967 as the Birmingham and Five Counties Architectural Association, is a professional association of architects based in Birmingham, England, and affiliated to the West Midlands Region of the Royal Institute of British Architects.

The association was formed through the amalgamation of two earlier groupings. The Birmingham Architectural Society was founded in 1851 with the aim of holding regular meetings between senior local members of the profession and providing an architectural library. The Birmingham and District Architectural Association was formed in 1874 for younger members of the profession. The two were closely related, with a member of the senior society being elected as the President of the junior grouping, and by 1895 the two had combined into a single organisation under the Birmingham Architectural Association name.

The Birmingham School of Architecture can trace its origins to a series of classes held by the association in 1908.

By 1933, membership had expanded to include architects from the area surrounding the city. In that year the name of the association was changed to the Birmingham and Five Counties Architectural Association to reflect its representation in the counties of Warwickshire, Staffordshire, Shropshire, Worcestershire and Herefordshire – the area of the modern West Midlands Region. Chapters were set up throughout the district and studentships were awarded for the first time.

In 1968, the Royal Institute of British Architects reorganised into a comprehensive regional structure. The regional role of the Birmingham association was taken over by the new West Midlands Region of the RIBA, and the BAA returned to its original name and role representing the architects of the city, as the largest of the new region's six affiliated societies.

== See also ==
- John Jones Bateman, founder and first president
- Arthur Edwards, member
