= Arthur Edwards (architect) =

English architect 1863–1971

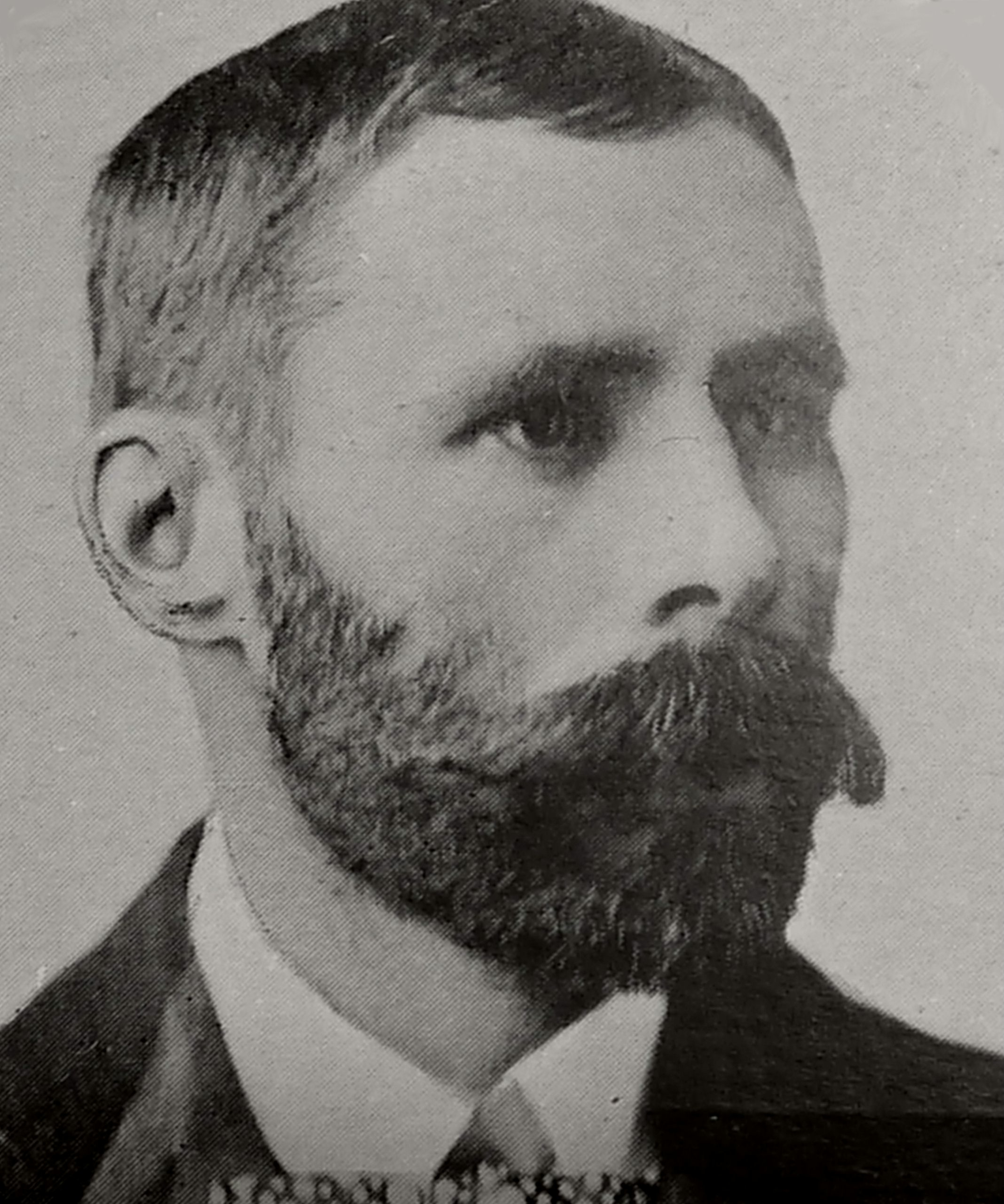
- Born: 18 March 1863; Birmingham, Warwickshire
- Died: 6 July 1927 (aged 64); Handsworth, Staffordshire
- Resting place: Handsworth Old Church
- Occupation: Architect
- Years active: 1874–1927
- Awards: Member of Birmingham Architectural Association
- Buildings: Birmingham Municipal Technical School; Royal Albert Hall, Aston; Craven Arms, Birmingham; Samson and Lion pub, Bordesley Green

Signature
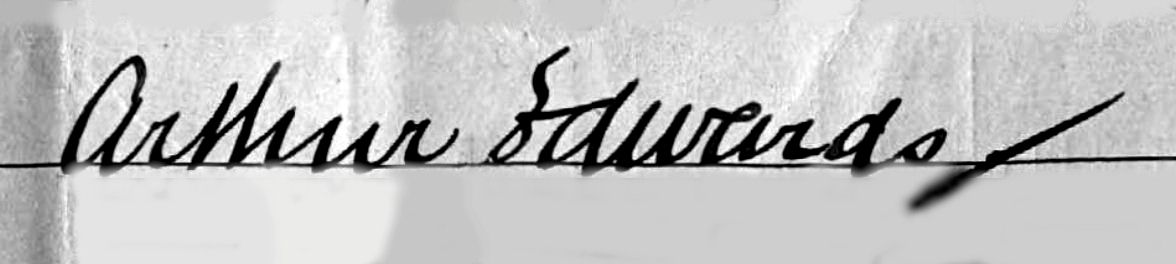

Arthur Edwards (18 March 1863 – 6 July 1927) was an architect based in Birmingham, Warwickshire. He designed or remodelled at least four listed buildings, including the Craven Arms public house, Birmingham, the Samson and Lion public house Bordesley Green, the Aston Cross Clock Tower and the Aston Cross Lamp Standard. He also designed the Birmingham Municipal Technical School which was a foundational building of Aston University, the Royal Albert Hall, Aston, various mills and factories, and numerous local residences.

== Background ==
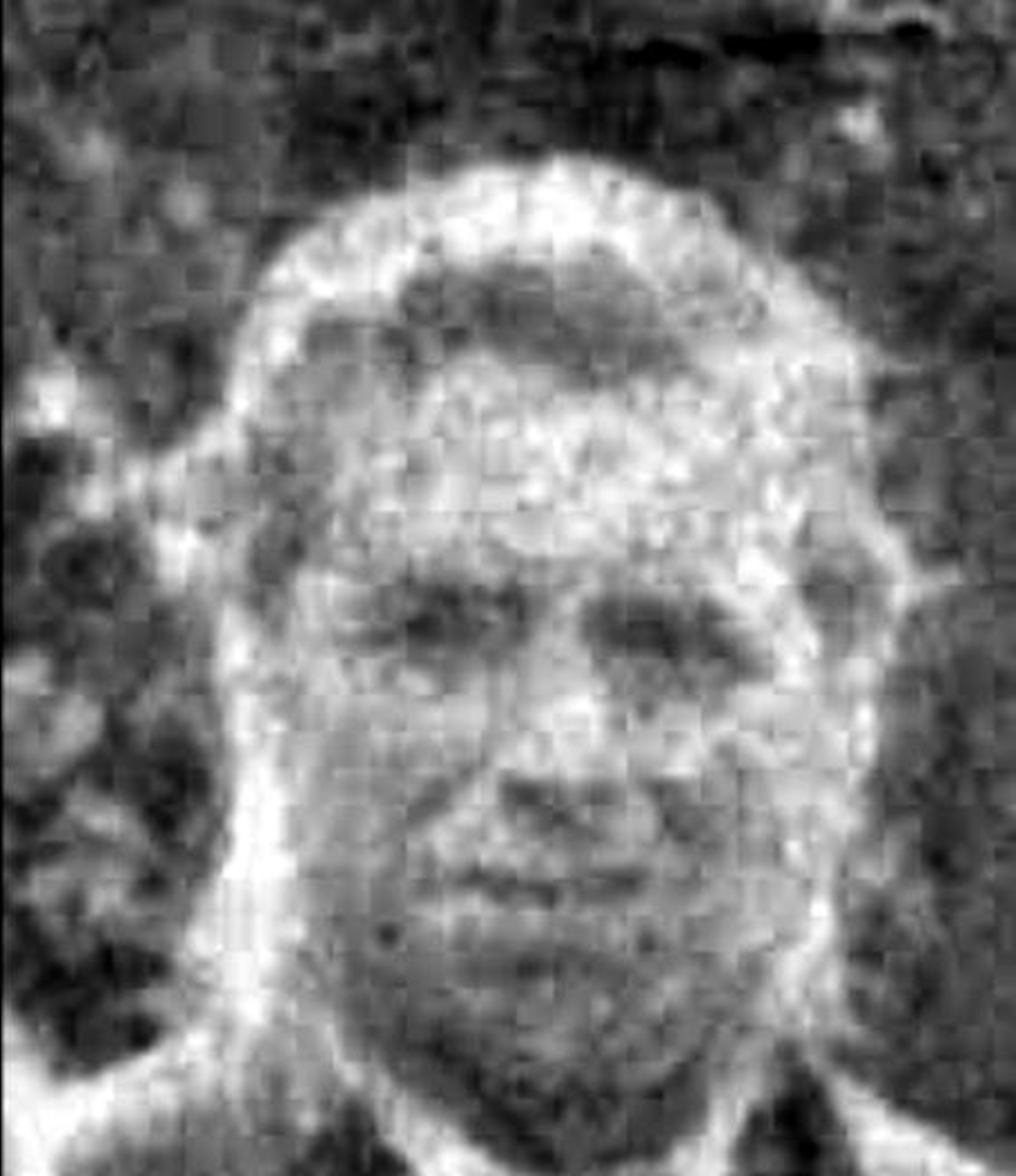
Gunmaker William Edwards

The immediate family of Edwards and his wife were Birmingham artisans and manufacturers. His paternal grandfather was John Edwards of Birmingham, a boot and shoe maker who was born in London, (Note: John Edwards (born London c.1803).) (Note: 1841 England census, Craken/Croker Lane, Birmingham, St Philip's parish. HO 107/1146/1 Page 38/38 John and Sarah Edwards (H.M. Government)) (Note: 1851 England census John and Sarah Edwards. 7 Coach Yard, St Peter's parish, Birmingham. HO 107/2057. Page 9. Schedule 26 (H.M. Government)) and his paternal grandmother was Sarah Edwards. (Note: Sarah Edwards (born Staffordshire c.1803).) Edwards' father was William Edwards of Birmingham, (Note: William Edwards (born Birmingham c.1825).) (Note: 1871 England Census, 79 Tower Street, Birmingham. RG10/3121. page 22/3. Schedule 13 (H.M. Government). Quote. Head, William Edwards, age illegible, born Birmingham, gun finisher. Wife Emma Edwards age 37, born Birmingham. Son William, age (13), clerk, born Birmingham. Son Arthur, age 8, scholar, born Birmingham) (Note: 1901 England Census 26 Vicarage Road, Handsworth. RG13/2709. Page 33/79. Schedule 180. (H.M. Government) Quote Arthur Edwards, 38, architect/building surveyor. Wife Rose Edwards 36. Children Mary E. age 11 and Arhur S. age 4. Edwards' parents: William Edwards age 76 retired gunmaker and Emma Edwards age 67. All born in Birmingham except Rose Edwards (born Aston)) originally a boot and shoe maker, then a gunmaker and gun finisher. His mother was Emma née Ford. (Note: Emma Edwards née Ford (born Birmingham c.1834). GRO index: Marriages Mar 1850 Ford Emma and Edwards William Aston 16 272.) (Note: 1871 England Census, 79 Tower Street, Birmingham. RG10/3121. page 22/3. Schedule 13 (H.M. Government). Quote. Head, William Edwards, age illegible, born Birmingham, gun finisher. Wife Emma Edwards age 37, born Birmingham. Son William, age (13?), clerk, born Birmingham. Son Arthur, age 8, scholar, born Birmingham) (Note: 1901 England Census 26 Vicarage Road, Handsworth. RG13/2709. Page 33/79. Schedule 180. (H.M. Government) Quote Arthur Edwards, 38, architect/building surveyor. Wife Rose Edwards 36. Children Mary E. age 11 and Arhur S. age 4. Edwards' parents: William Edwards age 76 retired gunmaker and Emma Edwards age 67. All born in Birmingham except Rose Edwards (born Aston)) Arthur Edwards was born in Birmingham. (Note: Arthur Edwards (Birmingham 18 March 1863 – Handsworth 6 July 1927). GRO index: Births Jun 1863 Edwards Arthur Birmingham 6d 173.) He had an elder brother, William Edwards junior. (Note: William Edwards junior (born Birmingham c. 1858) GRO index: Births Dec 1858 Edwards William Birmingham 6d 143.) (Note: 1871 England Census, 79 Tower Street, Birmingham. RG10/3121. page 22/3. Schedule 13 (H.M. Government). Quote. Head, William Edwards, age illegible, born Birmingham, gun finisher. Wife Emma Edwards age 37, born Birmingham. Son William, age (13), clerk, born Birmingham. Son Arthur, age 8, scholar, born Birmingham)

In West Bromwich in 1888, Edwards married Rose Heaton. (Note: Rose Edwards née Heaton (born Aston c.1865). GRO index: Marriages Sep 1888 Edwards Arthur and Heaton Rose W.Bromwich 6b 954.) Her ancestors were "well known in Birmingham, with family members involved with the Birmingham Mint". Her paternal grandfather was John Heaton, an iron founder of Aston, Birmingham. (Note: John Heaton (Birmingham c.1811 – Birmingham 1883).) (Note: 1841 England Census St James Street, Aston. John Heaton. HO 107/1149/9. Page 2/43. (H.M. Government)) Her father was Reuben George Heaton, (Note: Reuben George Heaton (Birmingham 1 August 1839 – Erdington 3 November 1923).) (Note: 1841 England Census St James Street, Aston. John Heaton. HO 107/1149/9. Page 2/43. (H.M. Government)) who in 1857 founded the Reuben Heaton company, which manufactures angling equipment. Edwards and his wife Rose had three children: Mary Eveline Edwards, (Note: Mary Eveline (or Evaline) Edwards (born Aston 1890). GRO index: .) (Note: 1901 England Census 26 Vicarage Road, Handsworth. RG13/2709. Page 33/79. Schedule 180. (H.M. Government) Quote Arthur Edwards, 38, architect/building surveyor. Wife Rose Edwards 36. Children Mary E. age 11 and Arhur S. age 4. Edwards' parents: William Edwards age 76 retired gunmaker and Emma Edwards age 67. All born in Birmingham except Rose Edwards (born Aston)) (Note: 1891 England census. 7 Buckfield Road, Aston Manor, Warwickshire. RG12/2432. Page 31/130. Schedule 193 (H.M. Government). Quote. Arthur Edwards, architect, wife Rose Edwards, child May Evaline Edwards age 1 year, one servant Charlotte S. Steadman) Arthur Stanley Edwards, (Note: Arthur Stanley Edwards (born Aston 1896). GRo index: Births Sep 1896 Edwards Arthur Stanley Aston 6d 403.) (Note: 1901 England Census 26 Vicarage Road, Handsworth. RG13/2709. Page 33/79. Schedule 180. (H.M. Government) Quote Arthur Edwards, 38, architect/building surveyor. Wife Rose Edwards 36. Children Mary E. age 11 and Arhur S. age 4. Edwards' parents: William Edwards age 76 retired gunmaker and Emma Edwards age 67. All born in Birmingham except Rose Edwards (born Aston)) and Grace Marjorie Edwards. (Note: Grace Marjorie Edwards (born Handsworth 1903). Births Jun 1903 Edwards Grace Marjorie W Bromwich 6b 833.)

Edwards died, aged 65, at his last address in 4 Park Avenue, Handsworth. His funeral was held at Handsworth Old Church on 9 July, 1927. He left £5,326 (equivalent to £289,285.61 in 2025).

== Career ==
Edwards was an architect and surveyor. He was articled to the architect William Jenkins at 34 Bennett's Hill, Birmingham, in 1878 when he was fifteen years old. He completed his articles and then remained in Jenkins's firm until 1891. Thereafter, he set up his own practice as an architect and quantity surveyor at 9 Bennett's Hill. Beside major projects such as the Royal Albert Hall, Aston, and the Birmingham Municipal Technical School, he designed town and country houses, warehouses, factories, breweries, bicycle works and large rubber mills.

== Building designs ==
=== Aston Cross Clock Tower, 1891 ===
The Aston Cross Clock Tower is a listed building, designed by Edwards. Historic England describes it as: "Iron. Square in plan. High plinth, the panelled shaft with Corinthianesque colonnettes with ring shafts at the corners and then the 4 clock faces surmounted by pediments with elaborate open cresting. Finial".

=== Aston Cross Lamp Standard, 1891 ===
The Aston Cross Lamp Standard is a listed building, designed by Edwards. It is described by Historic England as: "Iron. Ionic style column carrying scrolly arms for lamps now missing and ball finial".

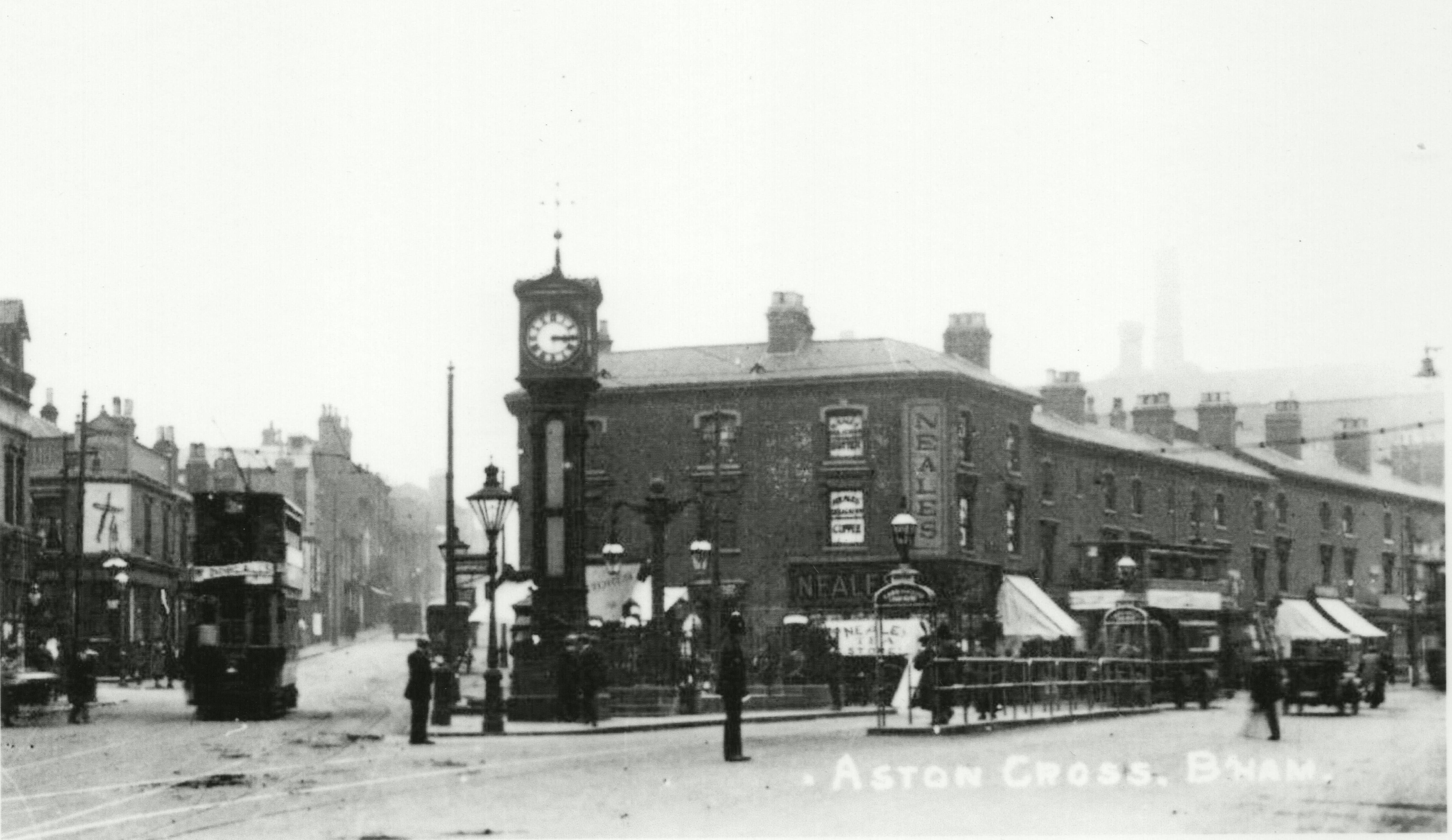
The Aston Clock Tower and Lamp Standard originally formed a group

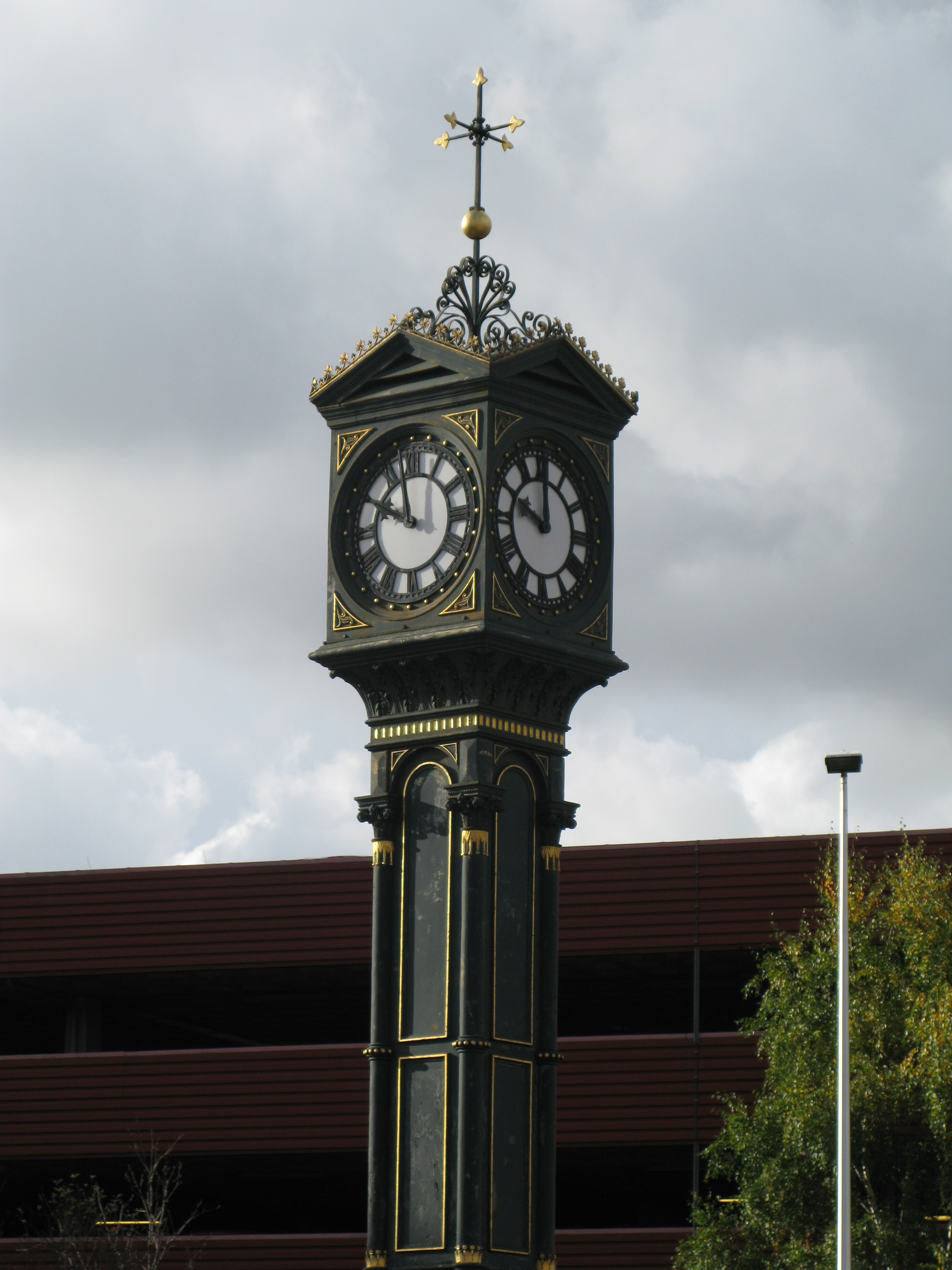
Aston Cross Clock Tower (detail)

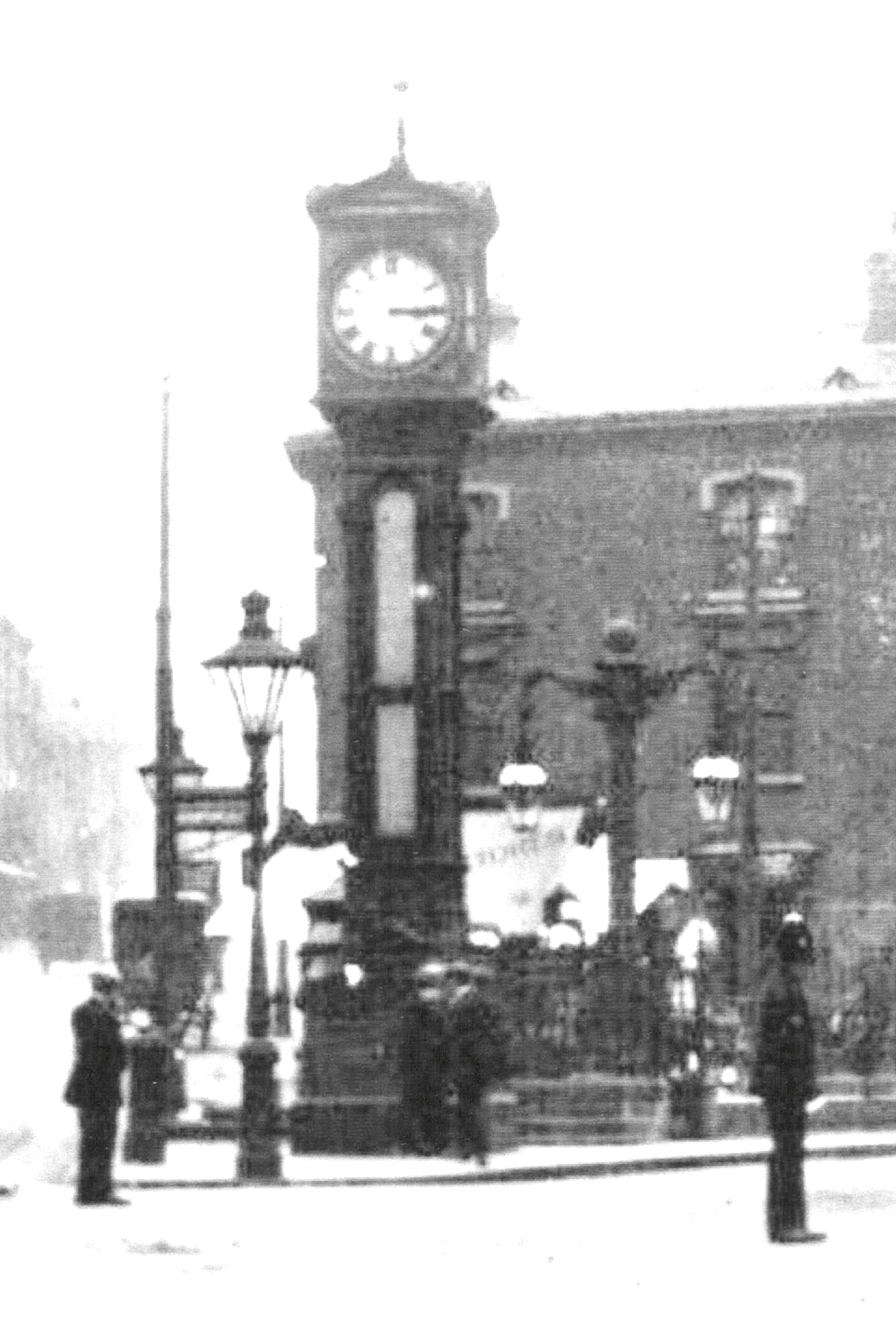
Aston Cross Clock Tower with Lamp Standard behind, before 1914

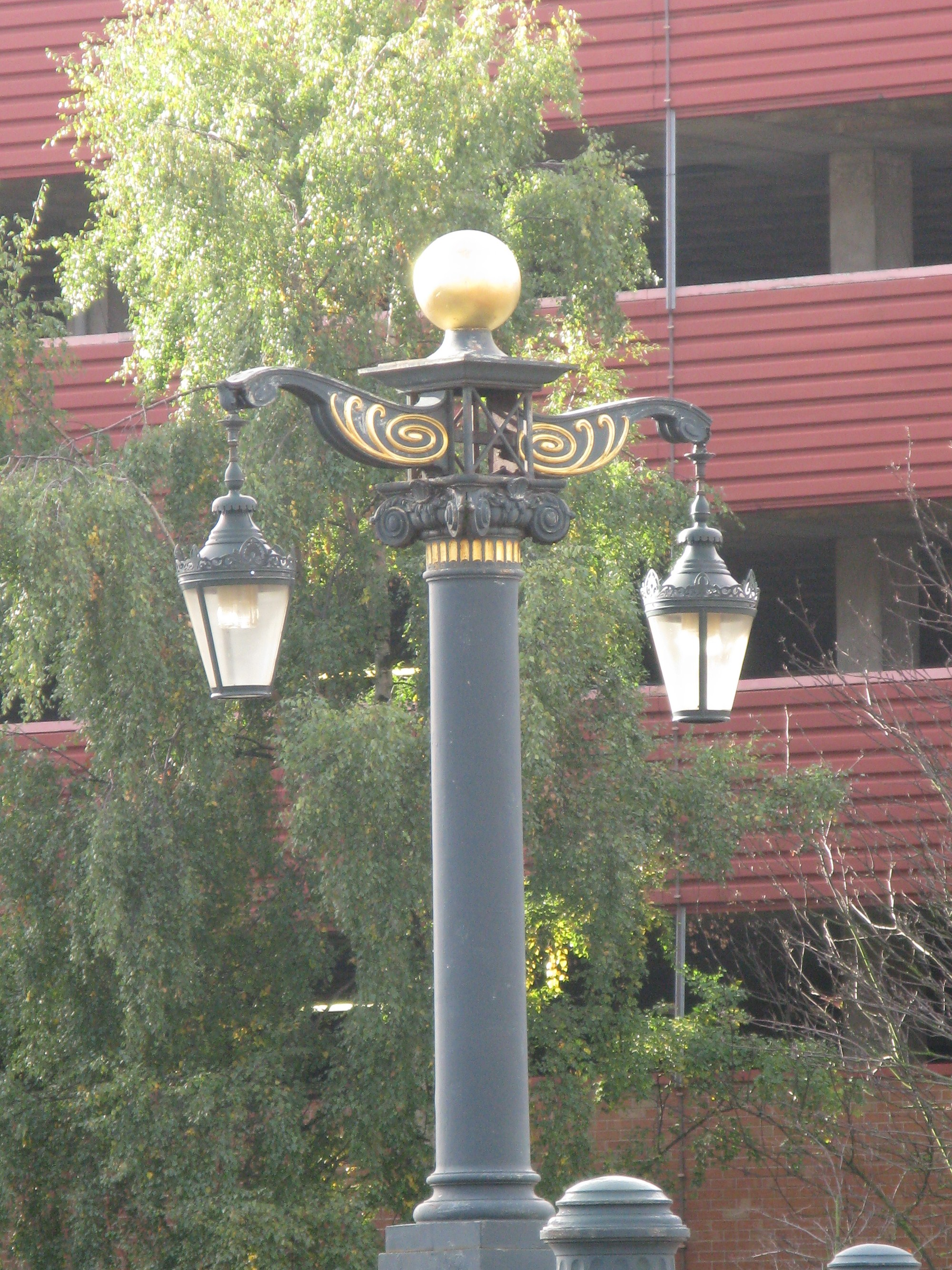
Aston Cross Lamp Standard (detail)

=== Birmingham Municipal Technical School, 1894 ===
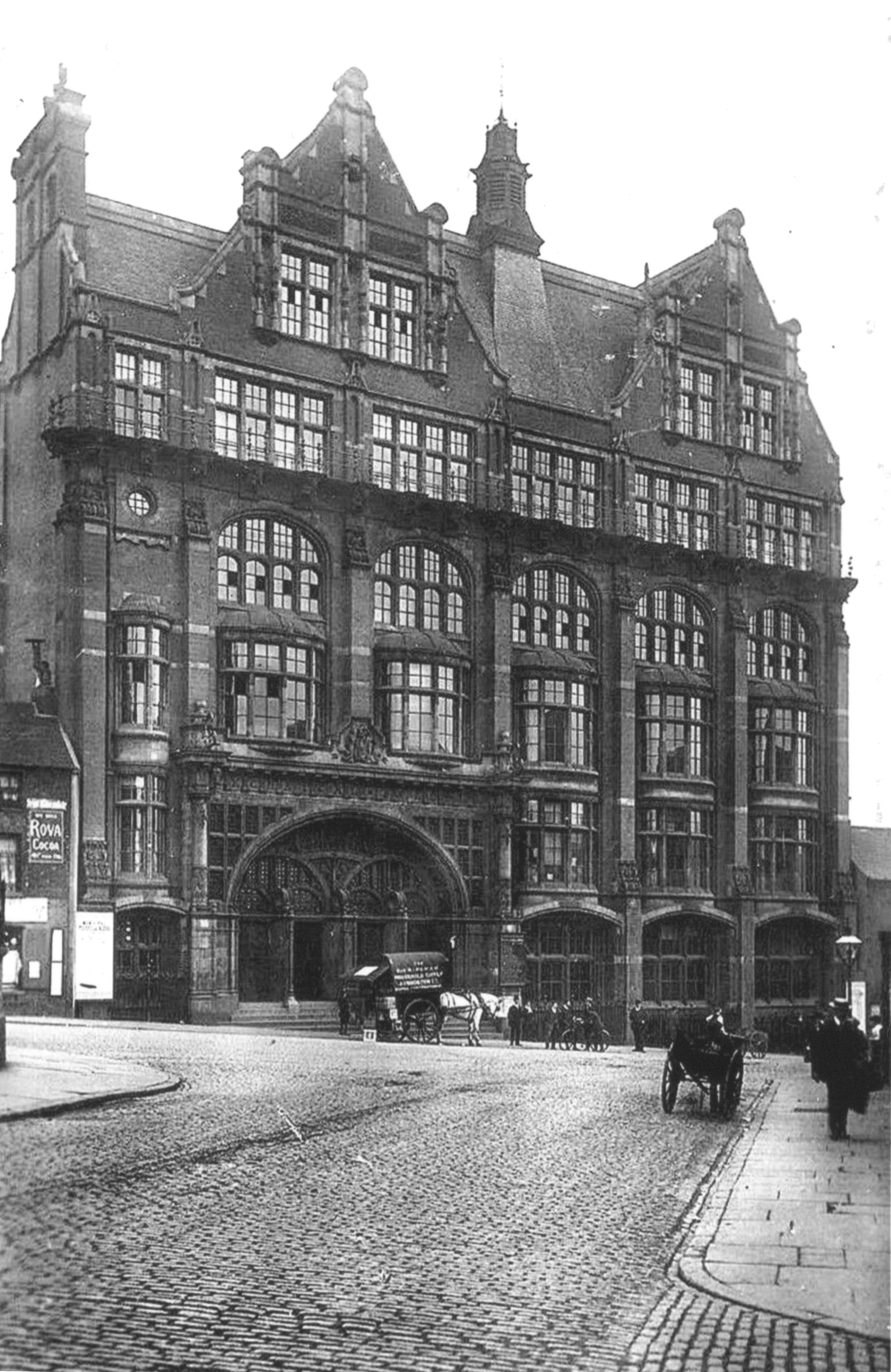
Former Birmingham Municipal Technical School

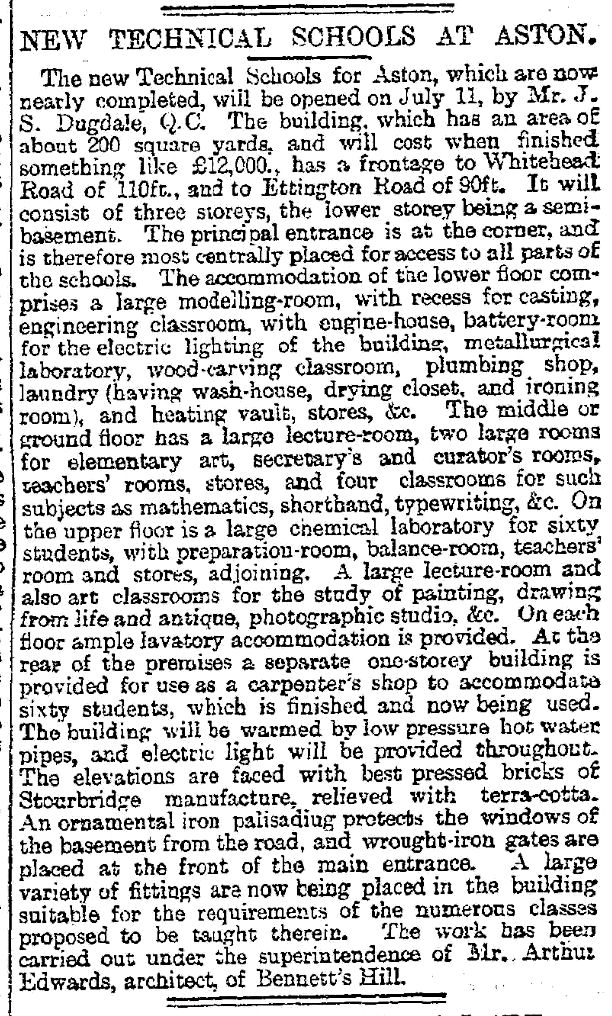
Newspaper description of the Aston Technical School, 1894

This building in Suffolk Street, Birmingham, was designed by Edwards as the Aston Technical Schools, and cost around £12,000 (equivalent to £1,348,528.64 in 2025). It was opened on 11 July 1894 by the barrister and politician John Stratford Dugdale, Q.C., who was at that time chairman of Warwickshire County Council. The occasion involved a two-hour light refreshment break for a "large number" of guests in a large classroom, followed by a speeches session in another large classroom. Dugdale was presented with a gold key decorated with "an embossed view of the school ... together with the arms of Aston and Mr Dugdale in enamel".

The three storeys of the building performed three functions: the basement held engineering shops using power, the middle storey held lecture rooms, and the top floor held laboratories. The lower storey was a semi-basement, holding heavy equipment such as a modelling room with casting facilities, an engineering classroom with engine house, a battery storage room which lit the building, a metallurgical laboratory and more. The term, "engine house" implies a steam engine, as it was normal at that time to use a horizontal-cylinder steam engine and hydraulics to power an engineering workshop, when the first functional diesel engine prototype was not built until 1897, and electric motors would power individual machines without the need for an engine house. However the engine house could have contained an additional Crossley gas engine for some purposes.

The ground or middle floor contained a lecture room, art rooms, classrooms and facilities for teachers and technical workers. On the top floor was a chemical laboratory, a lecture room and more art rooms, besides other facilities. The carpenter's shop was situated behind the building. The structure had electric light, lavatories and piped hot water heating. The building's exterior was decorated with terracotta, ornamental iron palisades, and wrought iron gates. Edwards was very much a project architect, being present to superintend the construction. It was a foundational building of Aston University, and was demolished in the 1960s.

=== Royal Albert Hall, Aston, 1899 ===
The Royal Albert Hall, Witton Road, Aston, was designed by Edwards in 1899. (Note: A picture of the Royal Hall, Witton Road, Aston (now known as the Royal Albert Hall) can be seen on Flickr)

=== Bandstand, Aston Park, Aston ===
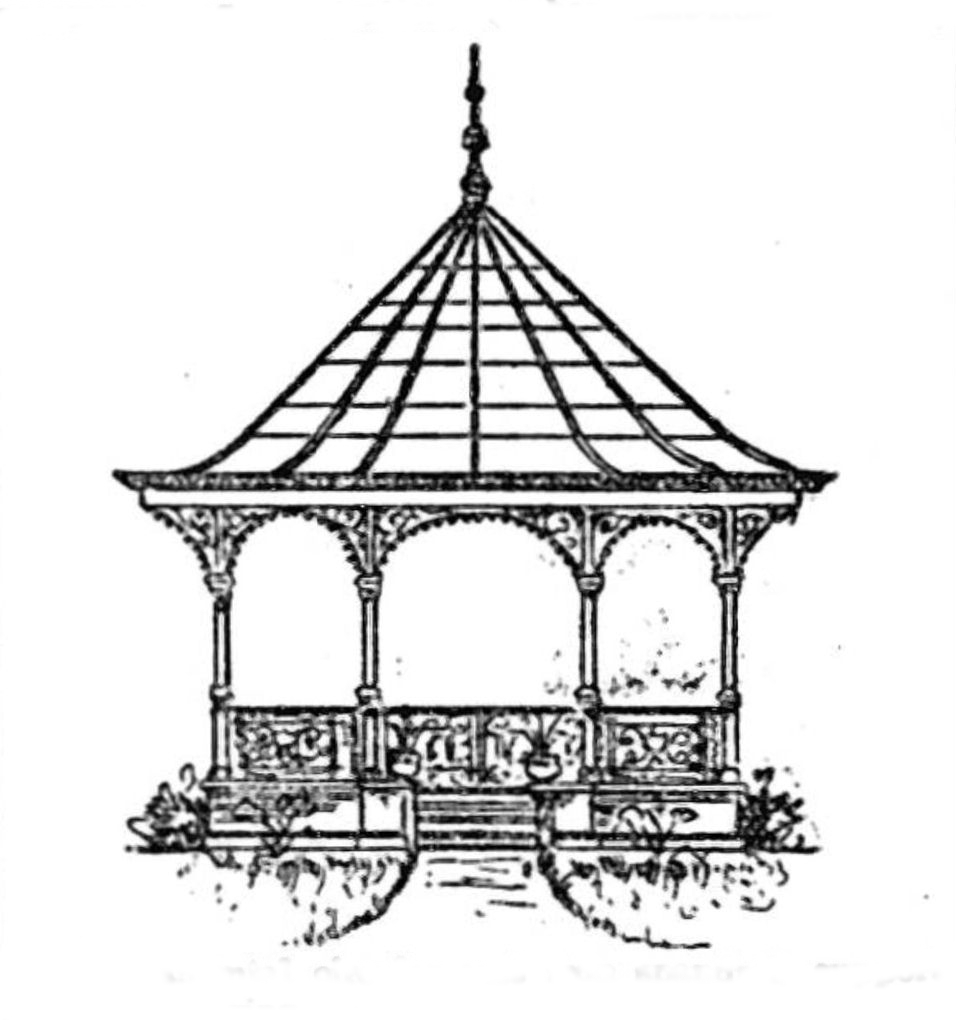
Aston Park Bandstand

Before Aston became part of Birmingham, the people of Aston had no local bandstand, and bands performing in Aston had to work outdoors, unprotected, in all weathers. Ultimately, Aston District Council paid for a bandstand, which was designed by Edwards at a cost of £360 (equivalent to £39,996.13 in 2025), and opened on 28 May 1899, on the site of Aston Hall's former tennis court in the grounds of Aston Park. The Birmingham Mail described it thus:

This erection ... which occupies the south end of what was originally the tennis lawn, is octagonal in shape and is 22 feet in diameter. The base is of King's red bricks, with York stone coping ... It has cast iron columns, with ornamental circular cast iron spandrels, supporting overhanging pyramid roof, 30ft in diameter. The roof is covered in zinc, surmounted by an artistic iron finial. The sides are filled in with ornamental cast iron railing and oak handrail, and each bay of the railing has a shield, two of which have the Birmingham coat of arms, two the Aston coat of arms, and two with inscription as follows: Presented to the City of Birmingham by Frederick Smith Esquire, J.P., chairman of the Aston Manor Urban District Council, May, 1899. The ceiling is boarded, so as to form a sounding board, and the structure is painted pale blue picked out with gold. It has been attempted as far as possible to make the design harmonious with the hall and its surroundings.

=== Harborne Industrial School, 1900–1902 ===
Edwards designed a building for Harborne Industrial School, replacing a former building which had become unusable. The pupils moved in, in 1902. Edwards' building was later demolished, and Aston University now stands on the site.

=== Samson and Lion pub, Yardley Green Road, 1913–1915 ===
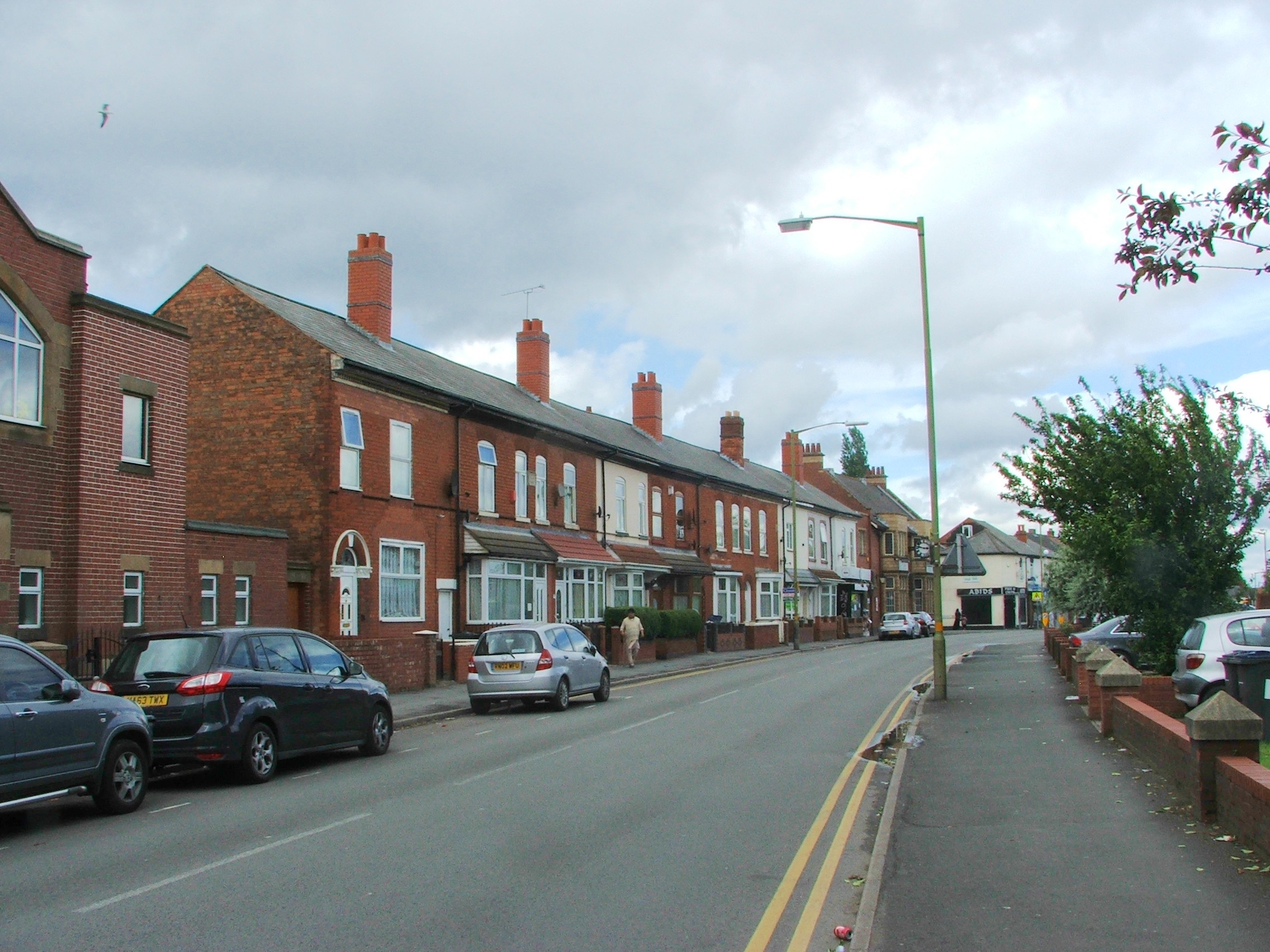
Former Samson and Lion pub, Bordesley Green (centre right)

The former Samson and Lion public house, 42 Yardley Green Road, Bordesley Green, Birmingham, is a listed building, designed by Edwards. Historic England says: "No longer in use as a pub. It was converted to The Clock Café, which is now closed. Currently in use by the Association of Islamic Charitable Projects". The building can be glimpsed behind the street lamp in the photograph (right). This is a decorative structure as described by Historic England. It is a bay-windowed, red brick building with diapering and terracotta details. The doors have "round-arched canopies with dentil ornament", and there is a large, bracketed clock projecting above the entrance. When registered by Historic England, the interior retained many original features, including a mirrored bar with etched glass panels, stained glass windows and original fire surrounds. Historic England describes the building as, "Well-detailed and little altered early C20 public house which illustrates the shift of emphasis from lavish decoration and opulence to greater restraint, simplicity and decency in the design of early C20 premises".

== Alterations and renovations ==
=== Components Tube Company, Birmingham, 1896 ===
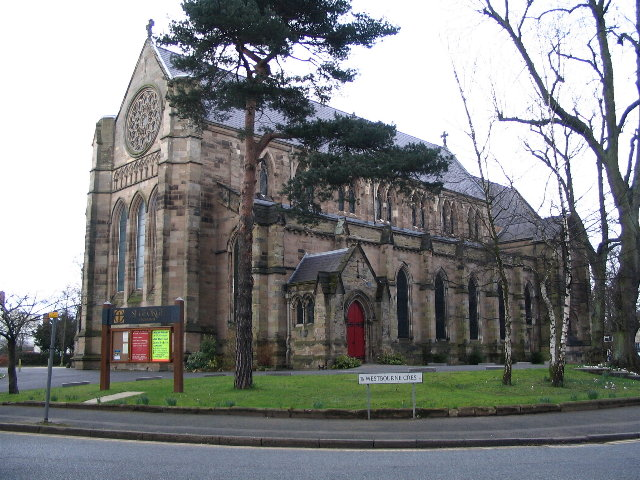
St George's Church, Edgbaston

Edwards prepared plans for alterations at the Components Tube Company (which made bicycle tyres) in Birmingham. The works were later carried out at the mills.

=== St George's Church, Edgbaston, 1899 ===
St George's Church, Edgbaston is a listed building, designed by Joseph John Scoles, Charles Edge and J. A. Chatwin. Edwards "carried out extensive alternations and restorations in the interior of the church in 1899".

=== Craven Arms, Birmingham, 1906–1910 ===
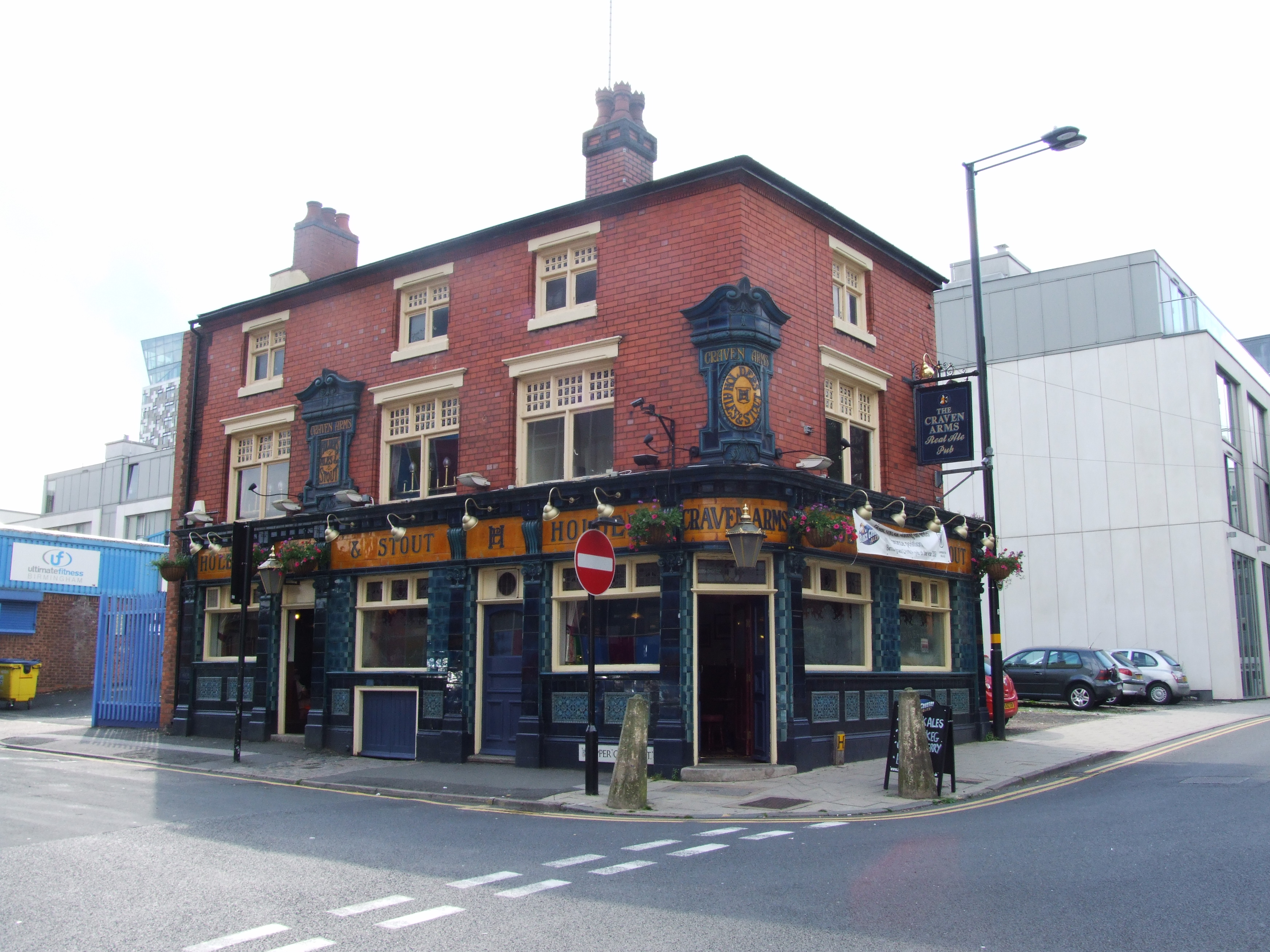
Craven Arms pub

The Craven Arms public house in Birmingham is a listed building, decoratively remodelled inside and out by Edwards. Historic England describes the building thus:

A C19 public house, remodelled between 1906 and 1910, with the addition of an ornate ceramic façade, attributed to local architect Arthur Edwards for Holders Brewery ... [designated] for its bold exterior which incorporates an exemplary scheme of architectural ceramics, featuring ornate capitals and textured tilework, along with high-quality etched and stained glass windows; [and] for the remarkable survival of the elegant Holders Brewery signage moulded into the friezes and cartouches, which speaks to the brewery’s pride and ambition for their tied premises. (Note: Historic England is correct that the Craven Arms was run by Holders Brewery, Birmingham, not Holdens Brewery which was also a Midlands company.)

== Associations ==
Edwards was elected a member of the Birmingham Architectural Association in 1892. He became a Worshipful Master of the Lodge of Freemasons in Holte in 1907. He was a manager of voluntary schools, a superintendent of the Working Men's School, and a member of the Handsworth Golf Club, the local Conservative Club and the Conservative Association. He was a churchwarden for St George's Church, Edgbaston, and an active church member and worker.
