= George Allen Underwood =

George Allen Underwood (1793 – 1 November 1829, Bath) was an architect in Cheltenham.

He was a pupil of Sir John Soane from 1807 to 1815 and then started his own practice in Cheltenham. He was Surveyor for Somerset, Dorset and the Dean and Chapter of Wells before moving to Bath in the 1820s.

Among the buildings in Cheltenham he designed were the Montpellier Spa (1817), Sherborne Spa (1818, demolished 1938), Cheltenham Masonic Hall (1818–1823), Holy Trinity Church (1820–1822) and the Plough Hotel (before 1826, demolished 1982 to build the Regent Arcade).

His other works include enlarging Beaminster Manor (1822) and rebuilding Ashwick Church (1825).

His brothers Charles and Henry were also architects.
