= Charles Underwood =

English builder

- Born: 1791
- Died: 5 March 1883 (aged 91–92); Clifton, Bristol, England
- Occupation: Architect

Charles Underwood (1791 – 5 March 1883) began as a builder in Cheltenham. He later moved to Bristol, and became a neo-classical architect. Underwood is known for his Greek revival style. This style is visible in some of his most famous works.

He designed the buildings of Arnos Vale Cemetery, in 1836. Arnos Vale is a notable example of the Greek revival style. In 1857, Underwood also designed the Royal West of England Academy, and is considered as another significant building in Bristol. Worcester Terrace in Clifton, is another example of his work. This impressive terrace shows his skill with neo-classical design. It stands in central Clifton.

Underwood's family also worked in architecture. His brothers, George Allen Underwood and Henry Underwood, were architects too. Each brother contributed to the architectural field in some way.
