= Robert Janyns =

English architect

Robert Janyns (fl. 1438–1464) was an English gothic architect. He worked on All Souls College, the chapel of Merton College and the Divinity School, Oxford.
