= Alexander Nelson Hansell =

British architect

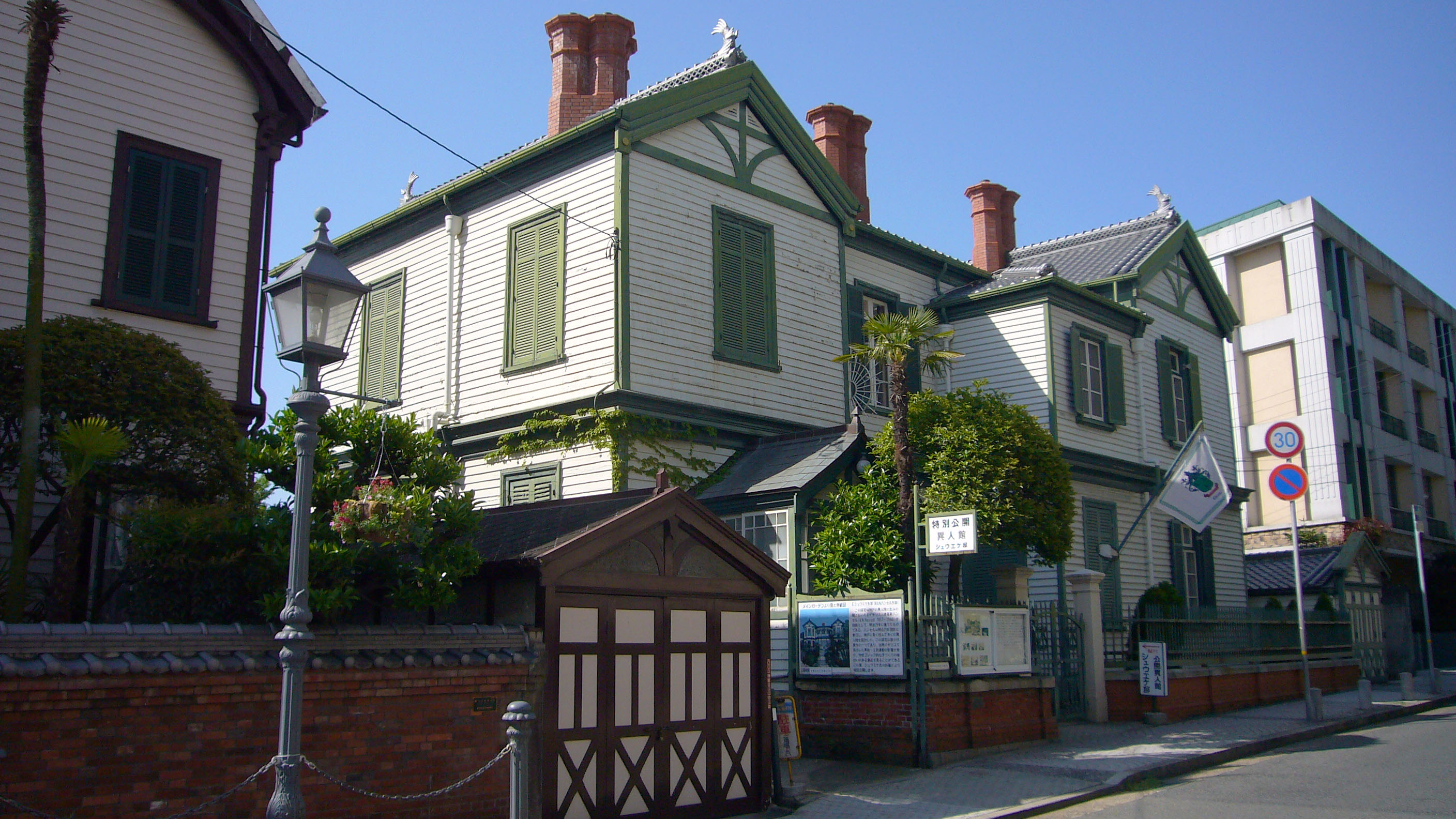
The Choueke House, built as Hansell's personal residence

Alexander Nelson Hansell (6 October 1857 (Note: Or 1856 according to Arthur Charles Fox-Davies (1929). Armorial Families: A Directory of Gentlemen of Coat-Armour. Hurst & Blackett, Ltd. p. 870.) – 1940) was a British architect known primarily for his activities in Kobe, Japan. In 1891 he became a fellow of the Royal Institute of British Architects (Note: The only other fellow of the RIBA in Japan at the same period was Josiah Conder.) He had an apprentice named Yokoyama Eikichi.

== Life ==
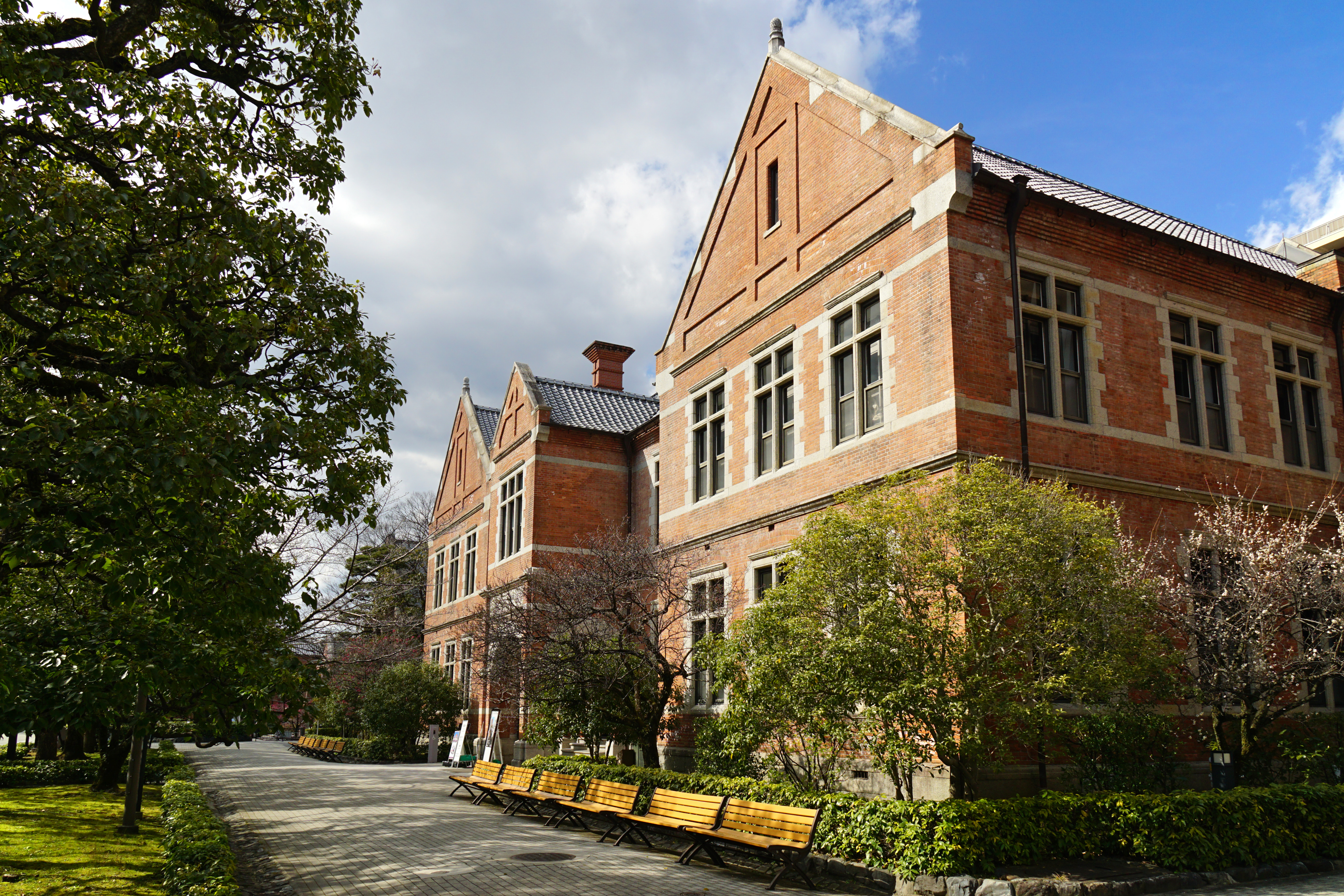
The Harris Science Hall at Doshisha University, the first building in Japan that Hansell was involved in building

Hansell was born on 6 October 1857 in Caen in Normandy, France.His father Peter Hansell was a British pastor, who had been rector of Kingsdon, Somerset before being appointed as Consular Chaplain of Caen on 11 October 1853. Father and son later returned together to Somerset, England.

At some point Alexander moved from Somerset to Winchester, where he studied architecture, and in 1888 he moved to Japan. He worked teaching English at a seminary on Lot 18 of the Kawaguchi foreign settlement in Osaka before beginning his activities as an architect. His first job was the planning of the Harris Science Hall at Doshisha University. He continued on to design the clubhouse of the newly renamed Kobe Club at the Kobe foreign settlement, and was thereafter involved in the planning of many more structures both inside the foreign settlement and in the surrounding mixed residential zone.

During the First World War, Alexander's only son Kenneth was killed in battle. Alexander mourned his loss greatly, and in 1920 he moved to Hankou in China, and then later to Monaco, where he died.

Hansell's personal residence, known as the Choueke House, is now run as a tourist attraction, located on Yamamoto-dōri in Chūō-ku, Kobe.

== Important works ==
In and around the foreign concession

- Original Kobe Club clubhouse: 1890 (in Higashi Yuenchi Park, destroyed by the war in 1945)
- Delacamp & Co. office at Lot 122 in the concession: 1893
- Choueke House: 1896, Hansell's own residence
- Club Concordia clubhouse at Lot 126 in the concession: 1896
- German consulate at Lot 115 in the concession: 1901
- HSBC at Lot 2 in the concession: 1902
- Jardine Matheson at Lot 67 in the concession: 1905
- Guggenheim House: 1912, currently owned by the stained glass artist Michiyo Durt-Morimoto
- Standard Chartered bank at Lot 67 in the concession
- Sharp House (assumed): 1903, Important Cultural Property
- Former Hassam House (assumed): 1902, Important Cultural Property

Elsewhere

- Harris Science Hall at Doshisha University: 1890, Important Cultural Property
- Meiji Hall at St. Agnes' School: 1895, registered Tangible Cultural Property
- Dethlefsen House, 1895, former home of A. P. Dethlefsen
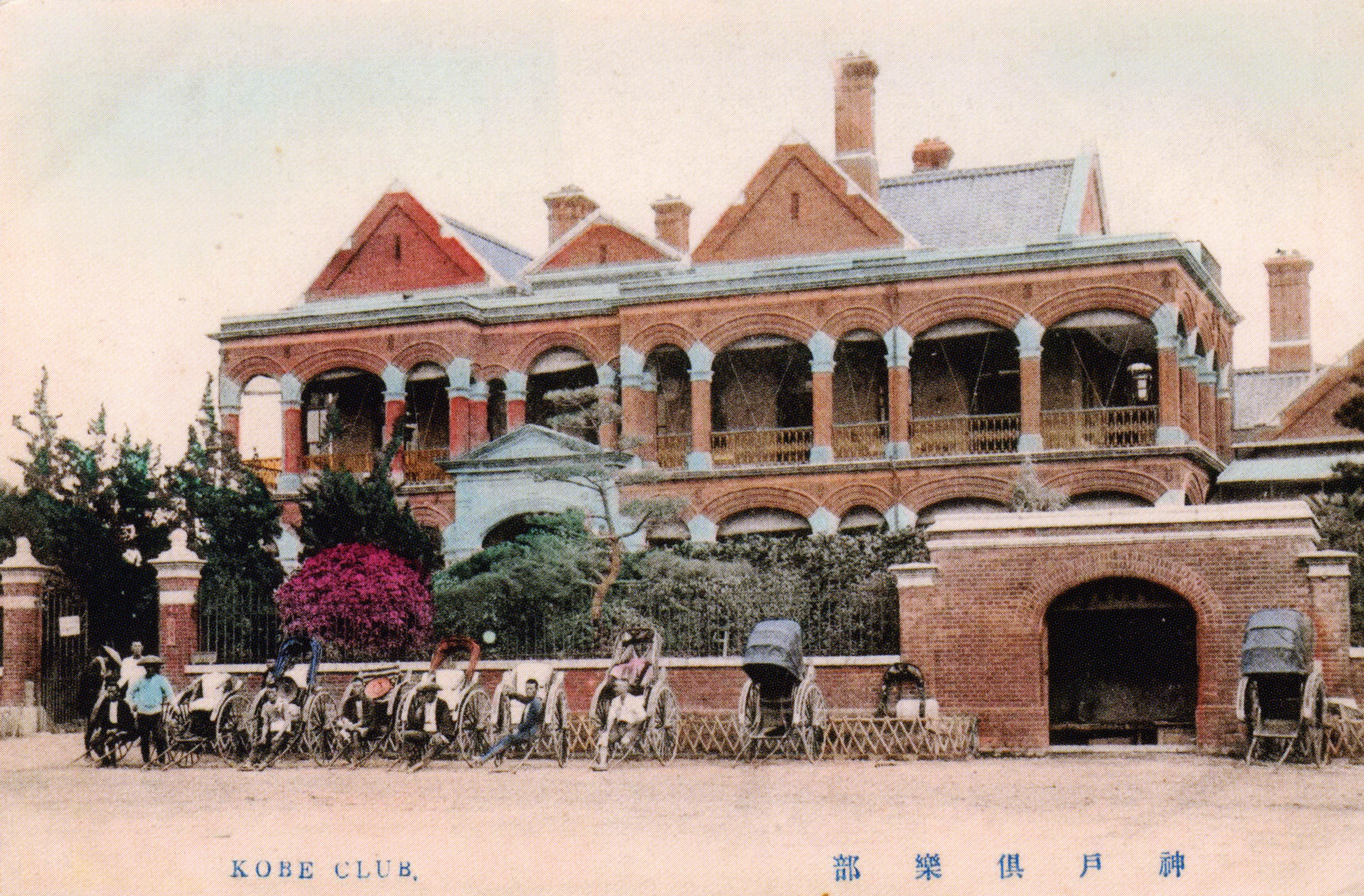
The first clubhouse of the Kobe Club

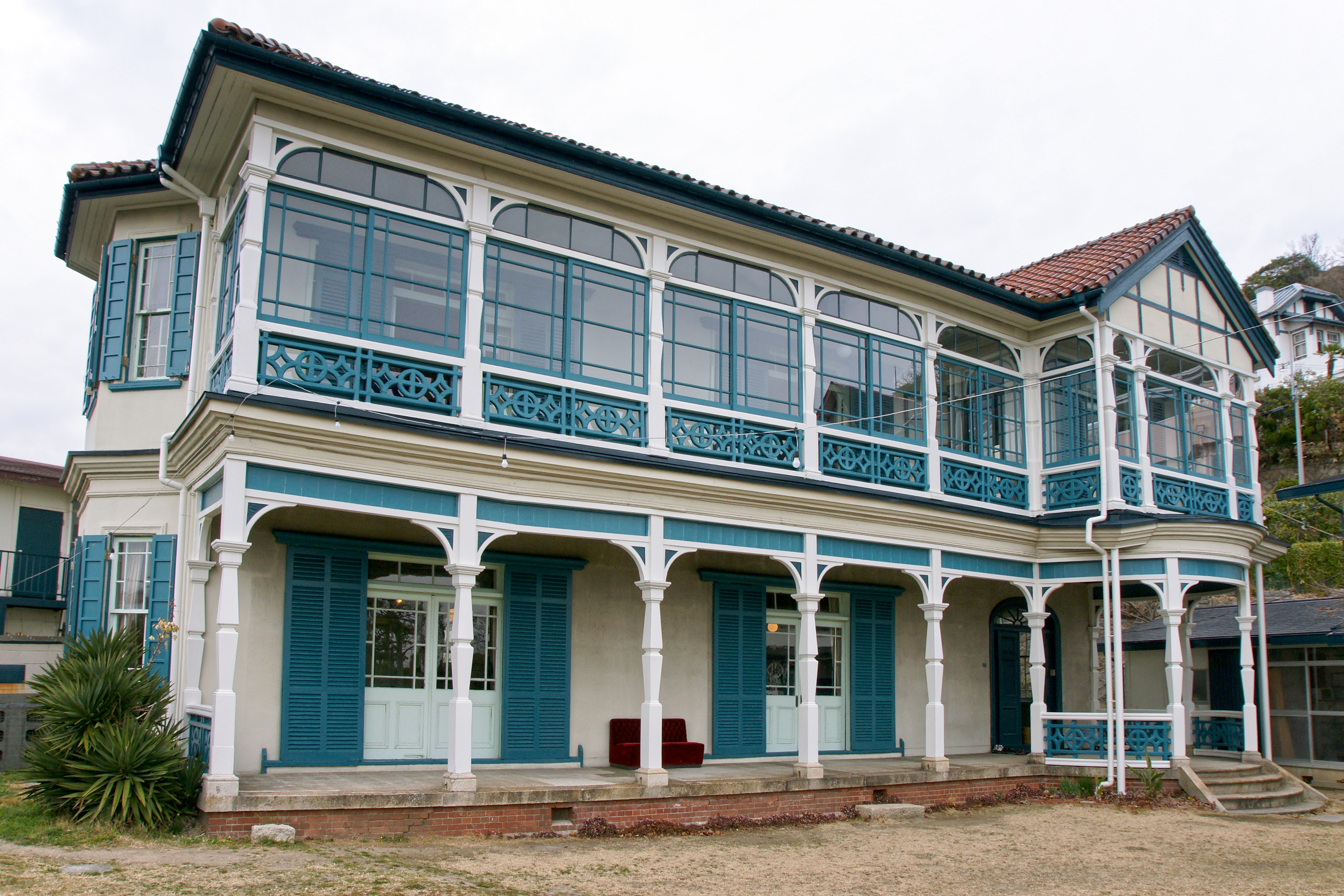
The Guggenheim house
