= Pitsea Marsh =

Protected area in Essex, England

Coordinates: 51.554°N 0.51°E

- Site of Special Scientific Interest
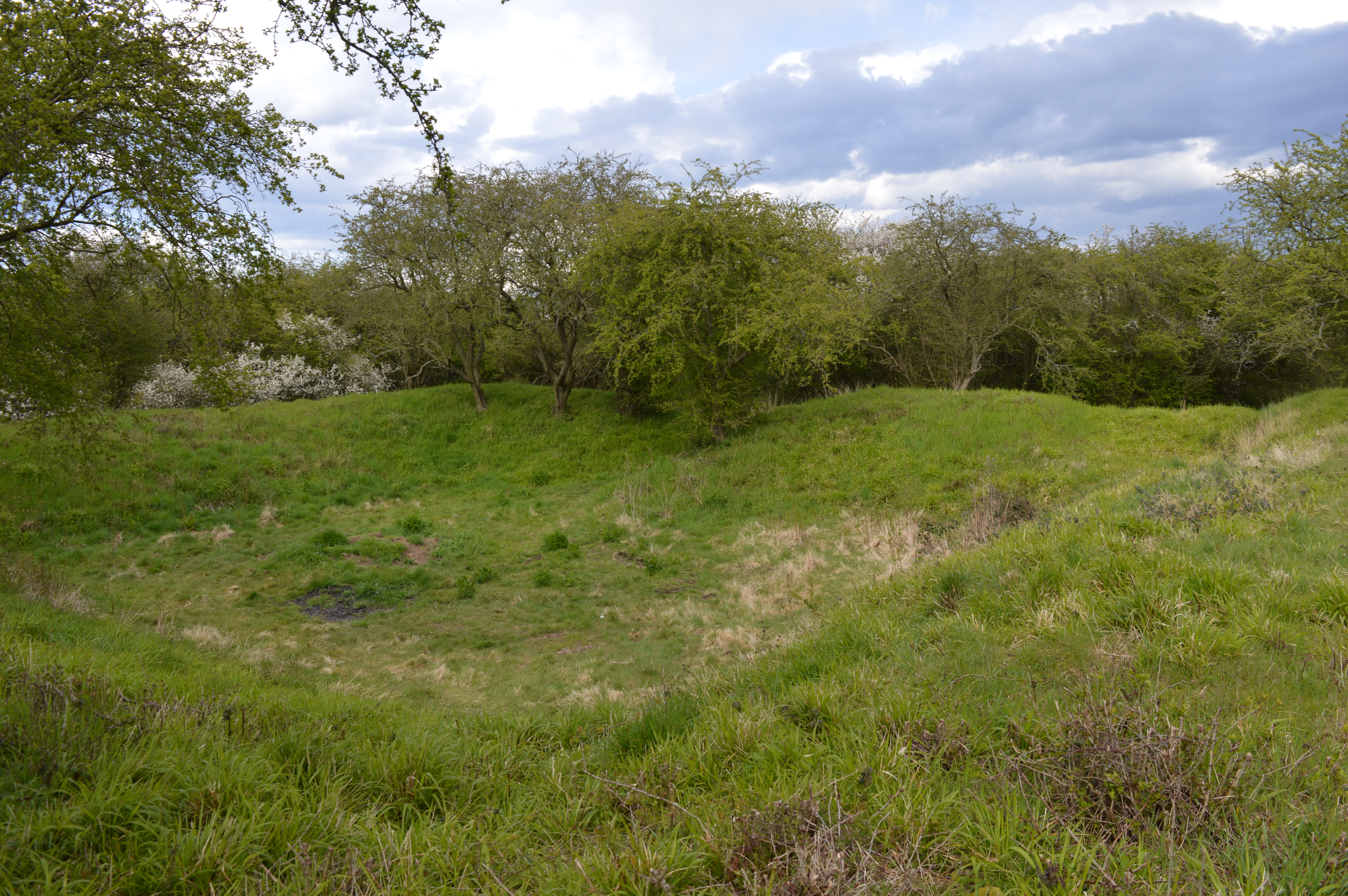
- Location of Pitsea Marsh.
- Area of search: Essex
- Grid reference: TQ735863; TQ740870
- Interest: Biological
- Area: 94.6 ha (234 acres)
- Notification date: 1987
- Location map: Magic Map

Pitsea Marsh is a 94.6-hectare (234-acre) Site of Special Scientific Interest in Pitsea in Essex. The southern half is the Wat Tyler Country Park, and the northern half is private land.

The site has a variety of habitats, such as grassland, scrub, reedbed, fen, ponds and saltmarsh. It was reclaimed in the seventeenth century, when Pitseahall Fleet was excavated to construct sea walls. The Fleet has a large and varied bird population. Dykes and ponds support the scarce emerald damselfly, and other rare invertebrates include Roesel's bush-cricket, a harvestman Leiobunum rotundum, a hoverfly xanthandrus comtus, and a ground beetle dyschirius impunctipennis.

There is access to the country park from Pitsea Hall Lane.
