= Gloucester Park =

Gloucester Park may refer to:

- Gloucester Park, Perth, harness racing and cricket venue in Perth, Western Australia
- Gloucester Park, Gloucester, public park in Gloucestershire, England
- Gloucester Park, Basildon, public park in Essex, England
- Te Hopua a Rangi, volcano in Auckland, New Zealand
- Gloucester National Park south of Perth, Western Australia
- Gloucester Business Park, in Gloucester, England
