= Pitsea waste management site =

Landfill in Essex, England

Coordinates: 51.556°N 0.505°E

Pitsea waste management site is a large landfill site on the north side of the Thames estuary 0.7 miles (1.1 km) from Pitsea in Basildon, Essex. It is the second largest landfill site in the UK operated by Veolia Ltd. receiving 800,000 tonnes of solid waste per year, mostly from the London conurbation.

The decomposition of organic matter within the landfill generates a gas rich which is rich in methane. This landfill gas is collected by a network of pipes and since 2001 has been used to power generators producing 16.2 MW of electricity. The electricity is sent into the National Grid; this amounts to about 94.4 GWh per year sufficient to power 14,300 homes.

After the site closes in the early 2020s, the Royal Society for the Protection of Birds plans to convert it to a nature reserve.
