= Vange Hill =

Nature reserve in Essex, England

Coordinates: 51.5621798°N 0.4788534°E

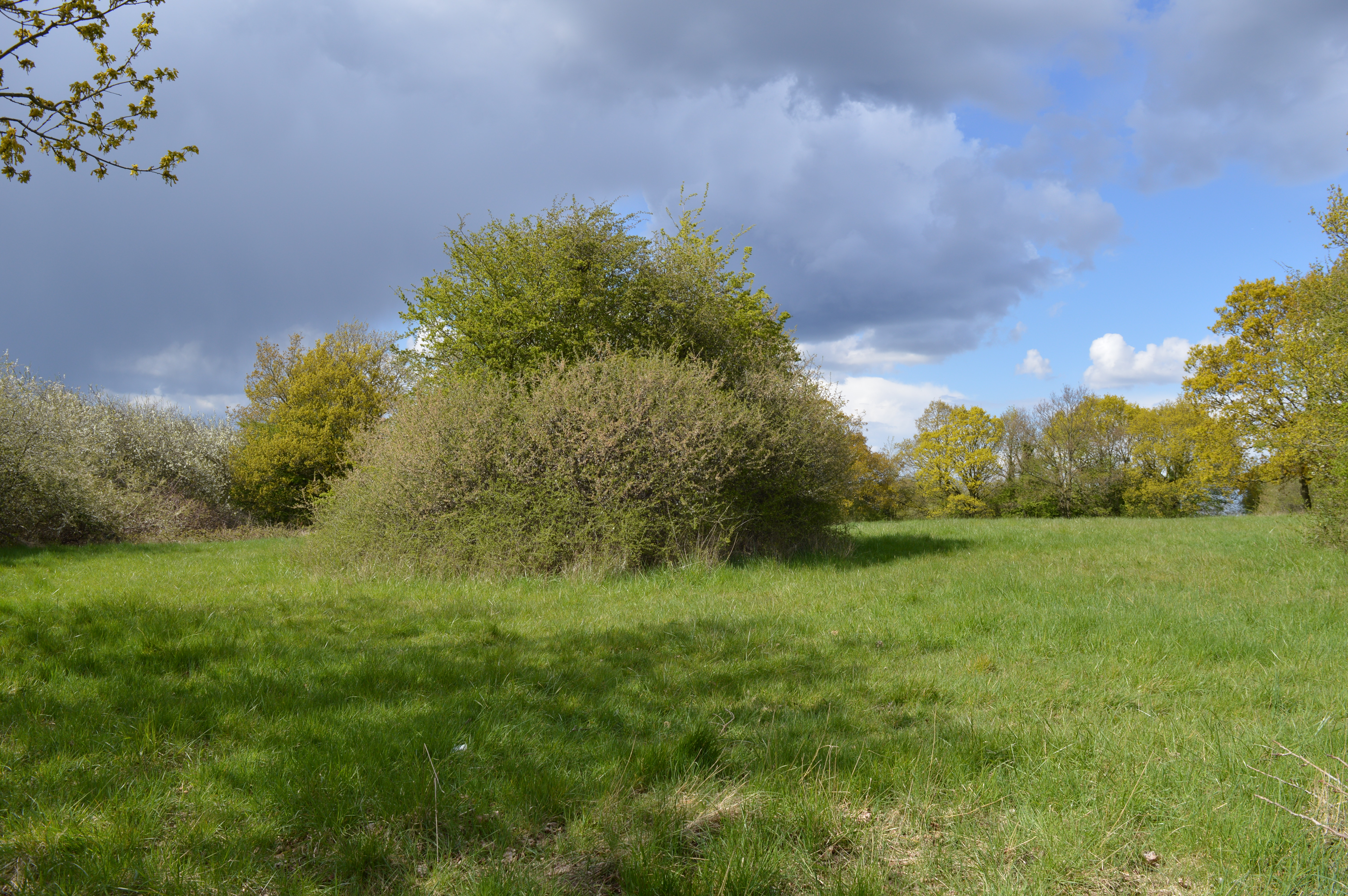
- Interactive map of Vange Hill
- Type: Local Nature Reserve
- Location: Basildon, Essex
- OS grid: TQ720876
- Area: 11.5 hectares (28 acres)
- Manager: Basildon Borough Council

Vange Hill is an 11.5 hectare Local Nature Reserve in Vange, a suburb of Basildon in Essex. It is owned and managed by Basildon Borough Council.

The site has grassland and scrub woodland, surrounded by a drainage ditch. Some meadow areas are closely mown, but others are only cut annually, allowing flowers to grow provide food for bumblebees and butterflies. There are unusual plants such as Pale Flax.

There is access from Vange Hill Drive.
