= Basildon =

Town in Essex, England

Coordinates: 51.58°N 0.49°E

- Town
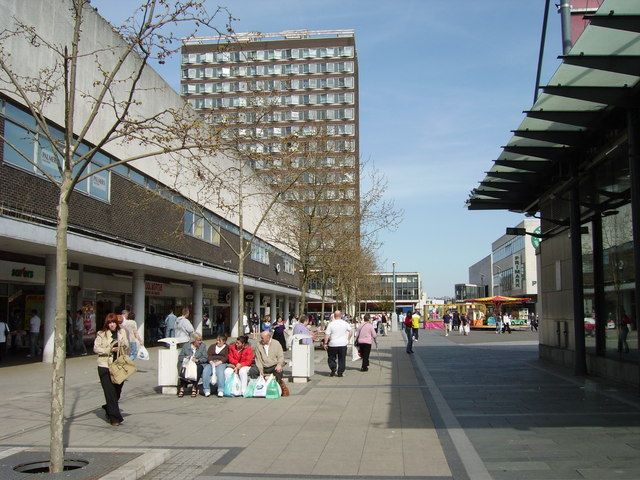
- Basildon Town Square, looking east

- Location within Essex
- Population: 144,859 (Built up area, 2021)
- OS grid reference: TQ7389
  - London: 25.6 miles (41.2 km) WSW
- District: Basildon
- Shire county: Essex
- Region: East
- Country: England
- Sovereign state: United Kingdom
- Post town: Basildon
- Postcode district: SS13 – SS16
- Dialling code: 01268
- Police: Essex
- Fire: Essex
- Ambulance: East of England
- UK Parliament: Basildon and Billericay; South Basildon and East Thurrock
- Website: basildon.gov.uk

Basildon (/ˈbæzɪldən/ BAZ-il-dən) is a town in Essex, England. It lies 27 miles (43 km) east of Central London, 11 miles (18 km) south of Chelmsford, and 10 miles (16 km) west of Southend-on-Sea. It gives its name to the wider Borough of Basildon which also includes the towns of Billericay and Wickford and surrounding rural areas.

Basildon was a small village until the mid-20th century. In 1949 Basildon was designated a new town to accommodate London overspill, with the designated area for the new town also covering the existing villages of Pitsea, Laindon, and Vange, along with smaller hamlets. The town was then developed with new residential and industrial areas, and a new town centre. At the 2021 census the Basildon built up area had a population of 115,955.

The town is served by three railway stations on the London, Tilbury and Southend line, being Laindon, Basildon, and Pitsea. The main part of the town lies between the A127 road to the north and the A13 road to the south, both of which are dual carriageways linking London to Southend.

== History ==
=== Before the new town ===
The name Basildon is Old English and means the hill (dun) of someone called Beorhtel. "Beorhtel's dun" evolved over time into Basildon. Variant names historically recorded for the place have included Berdlesdon, Batlesdon and Belesduna.

The Domesday Book of 1086 lists two estates or manors at the vill of Belesduna or Berlesduna in the Barstable Hundred of Essex. Both manors were held by Swein, son of Robert FitzWimarc. Adjoining the two Basildon manors was a third manor called Barstable or Barstable Hall; the name suggests it may have included the meeting place for Barstable Hundred.

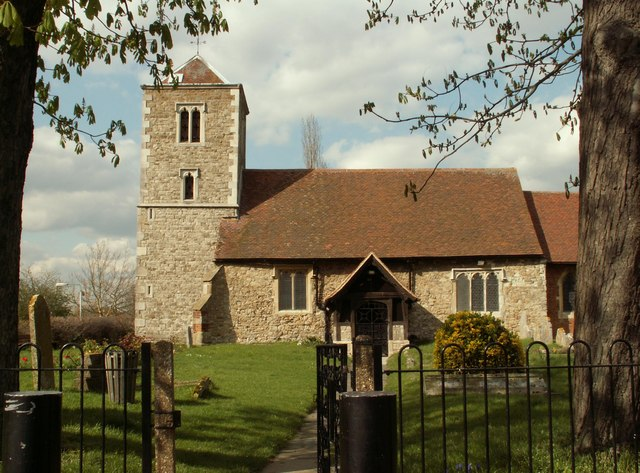
Holy Cross Church

Basildon became part of the parish of Laindon. Basildon was served by a chapel of ease dedicated to Holy Cross; the oldest parts of the current building date back to the 14th century. Basildon then formed a chapelry of Laindon, covering the two old Basildon manors, which had become known as Botelers and Battleswick, plus the old manor of Barstable. The chapelry of Basildon took on parish functions under the poor laws from the 17th century onwards. It therefore became a separate civil parish from Laindon in 1866 when the legal definition of 'parish' was changed to be the areas used for administering the poor laws.

The London, Tilbury and Southend Railway built its original main line from London to Southend via Tilbury with a station at Pitsea, which opened in 1855. The company subsequently built a shorter inland route, deviating from the older line at Barking and rejoining it at Pitsea. Laindon station opened with that new route on its completion in 1888.

The Basildon area remained sparsely populated until the early 20th century. The heavy clay soil was poor quality agricultural land. The first half of the 20th century was a period of wider agricultural depression, and many farms in the area were sold for development as plotlands, especially during the 1920s and 1930s. These saw people buy an individual plot to build a house. Little infrastructure was provided to serve the plotlands, and many of the houses built were of poor quality. The population of Basildon parish rose sharply in the early 20th century with the development of the plotlands; the population had been 179 in 1891, and grew to 505 in 1911 and 1,159 in 1931.

=== The new town ===
In the 1940s, Billericay Urban District Council and Essex County Council, concerned by lack of amenities in the area and by its development, petitioned the government to create a new town. Basildon was one of eight new towns created in the wider south-east of England after the passing of the New Towns Act 1946. On 4 January 1949 Lewis Silkin, Minister of Town and Country Planning, officially designated Basildon as a new town.

Basildon Development Corporation was formed in February 1949 to transform the designated area into a modern new town. The main villages within the designated area for the new town were Laindon and Pitsea, with other settlements including the smaller Basildon and Vange. There were about 8,700 existing homes in the designated area for the new town, of which 5,500 were deemed substandard. A masterplan was published in 1951, structuring the development around a number of small neighbourhoods. The landscaping was designed by Sylvia Crowe, with open space and playing fields distributed throughout the developed area to preserve the best landscape features. The first house built under the new town programme was completed in June 1951. The first tenants moved into homes in Redgrave Road in Vange.

The masterplan included employment areas along the northern edge of the town along the A127 corridor. A new town centre based around a pedestrian shopping precinct was begun in 1956. A new Basildon railway station on the southern edge of the town centre was opened in 1974.

A large, illuminated town sign "Basildon Town Centre Site" at 3.5 feet (1.1 m) was erected in 1956 beside the railway and stood until early construction was completed. The Basildon Centre, which incorporates the local council offices, was officially opened by Jack Cunningham on 14 November 1989.

Since March 2010, Basildon has a miniature famous white Hollywood sign, reading "Basildon"; at five feet tall, the new sign is one-ninth of the height of the Hollywood original. part of a plan of landscaping and infrastructure improvements funded by £400,000 from the Prescott-spearheaded Thames Gateway. Opponents from all parties believe spending could have been directed toward social problems.

== Governance ==
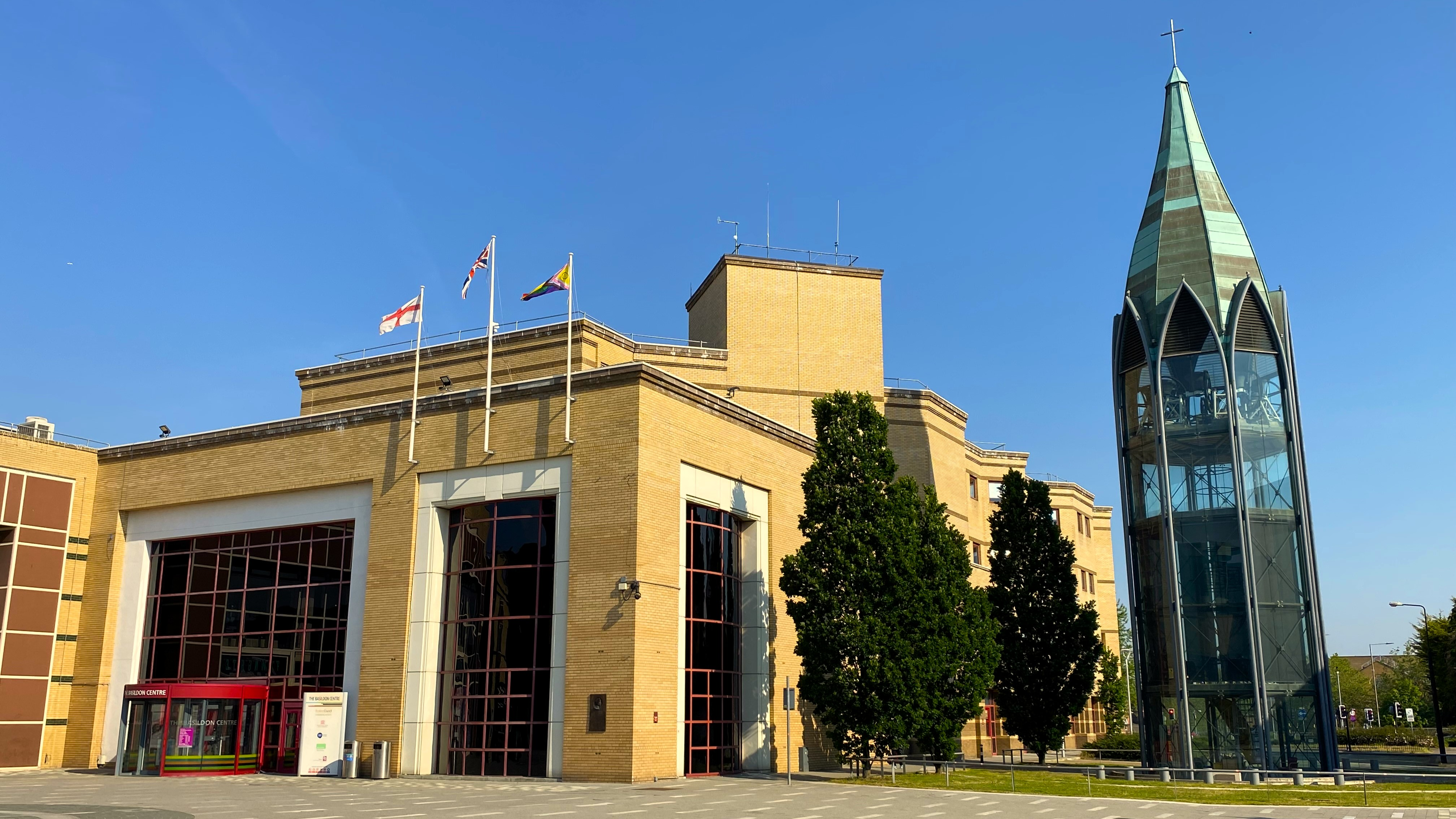
The Basildon Centre and bell tower of St Martin's Church, St Martin's Square

There are two main tiers of local government covering Basildon, at district and county level: Basildon Borough Council and Essex County Council. Most of the built up area as defined by the Office for National Statistics is unparished, although the northern part forms part of the parish of Noak Bridge, which forms an extra layer of local government for that area. The borough council is based at the Basildon Centre in St Martin's Square.

The former constituency of Basildon was considered a barometer of public opinion in general elections. The results of the constituency elections were the same as the overall result of general elections from 1983 to its abolition in 2010. Basildon was said to epitomise the working class conversion to Thatcherism during the 1980s, though the town did not vote Conservative in 1979; nor did the Conservative Party ever hold an absolute majority in the town – its success was due to the split between the SDP and the Labour Party. "Basildon Man" or "Essex Man" was coined to describe an aspirational working class voter.

Boundary changes, which came into force from the 2010 general election, mean that the area is politically represented by two MPs, from the constituencies of Basildon and Billericay and South Basildon and East Thurrock. The current MPs are Richard Holden (Conservative Party) and James McMurdock (Independent).

In January 2026 the Labour leader of Basildon Borough, Gavin Callaghan instigated a vote to cancel the local May elections due to the pending local government changes which would see Basildon Council replaced. The vote was successful and the request was passed to the government to decide. Opposition groups criticised Callaghan, with Andy Barnes, the Conservative leader, stating the decision was a "dark day for democracy".

=== Administrative history ===
Basildon was historically a chapelry of the ancient parish of Laindon, and became a separate civil parish in 1866. When elected parish and district councils were created in 1894, Basildon was included in the Billericay Rural District. Most of the rural district, including Basildon, was converted into the Billericay Urban District in 1934, and the parishes within the urban district were united into a single parish called Billericay in 1937. At the 1931 census (the last before the abolition of the civil parish), Basildon had a population of 1,159.

Following the designation of the new town in 1949, it was decided in 1955 to rename the urban district from Billericay to Basildon. In 1974 the urban district was replaced by a non-metropolitan district called Basildon, which covered the area of the old urban district plus a small area ceded from neighbouring Thurrock which lay within the designated area for the new town.

The Basildon district was awarded borough status in 2010, allowing the chair of the council to take the title of mayor.

== Communities ==
Basildon was built like many new towns with each area being a planned community. These communities are now the local areas of the town:

- Pitsea - one of the original four villages that were incorporated into the new town. Pitsea itself is split into 7 distinct communities - Pitsea, Pitsea Mount, Eversley, Chalvedon, Northlands (formerly Felmores), Burnt Mills and Nevendon.
- Laindon - one of the original four villages that were incorporated into the new town.
- Vange - one of the original four villages that were incorporated into the new town.
- Fryerns - an area of Basildon which is located along Whitmore Way. The name came from a nearby farm (reputedly the first farm compulsorily purchased by the Basildon Development Corporation) and was formerly the home of Fryerns Comprehensive School.
- Craylands - an area between Fryerns and Pitsea, and was named after the former Craylands County Secondary School. The area is under redevelopment by Swan Housing and has been renamed by them as Beechwood Village.
- Barstable - an area situated along Timberlog Lane. The area is named after the former Barstable Hundred and known for its local shopping parade Stacey's Corner. It was formerly home to both Barstable School and Timberlog Secondary School with the former being now part of the Basildon Academies.
- Kingswood - an area situated at the west end of Clay Hill Road.
- Ghyllgrove - an area situated between the Town centre and Fryerns.
- Lee Chapel South - an area situated between the Town centre and Basildon University Hospital.
- Lee Chapel North - an area situated between Gloucester Park, Lee Chapel South and Laindon
- Langdon Hills - an area situated south of Laindon.
- Dry Street - a small hamlet situated just south of Laindon and west of Vange.
- Great Berry - declared a village by Essex County Council in 2015, the area is situated west of Laindon.
- Noak Bridge - an area just north of Pipps Hill and east of Steeple View.
- Steeple View - an area just north of Laindon and West of Noak Bridge. It is so named because the steeples of Great Burstead Church, St. Mary the Virgin Church and St Nicholas Church, Basildon are visible from the area.
- Pipps Hill - an industrial area just north of Gloucester Park and west of Cranes.
- Cranes - an industrial area east of Pipps Hill. The name comes from the former Cranes Farm which stood on the site.

== Industry ==
Basildon has a heavily developed industrial base. During the construction of the New Town, government grants were given to companies to set up their businesses in Basildon. Amongst the companies that took up these grants were Ford Motor Company (active since 1964), Carreras Tobacco Company (1959–1984), Yardley of London (1966–1998), Gordon's Gin (1984–1998) and GEC-Marconi (now home to Leonardo MW).

Basildon has industrial areas situated in Laindon, Cranes Farm Road and Burnt Mills. Cranes Farm Road is currently home to CNH Tractor Plant. Argos opened a regional warehouse on Pipps Hill Industrial Estate in the 1990s. In 2015, an Amazon delivery base was opened in Christopher Martin Road. A data centre hosting the European matching engine of the Intercontinental Exchange is located in Gardiners Lane, Basildon on the site of the former York International factory.

In 2017, Costa Coffee established a roastery in Basildon – quadrupling the company's roasting capacity from 11,000 tonnes to 45,000 tonnes per year. The roastery, dubbed "Paradise Street", is the largest in Europe and can handle around 24 tonnes of coffee beans per hour.

== Climate ==
Climate in this area has mild differences between highs and lows, and there is adequate rainfall year-round. The Köppen Climate Classification subtype for this climate is "Cfb" (Marine West Coast Climate/Oceanic climate).

Climate data for Basildon
Month	Jan	Feb	Mar	Apr	May	Jun	Jul	Aug	Sep	Oct	Nov	Dec	Year
Mean daily maximum °C (°F)	8 (46)	8 (46)	11 (52)	13 (55)	17 (63)	20 (68)	22 (72)	22 (72)	19 (66)	15 (59)	11 (52)	8 (46)	15 (59)
Mean daily minimum °C (°F)	3 (37)	3 (37)	4 (39)	5 (41)	8 (46)	11 (52)	14 (57)	14 (57)	11 (52)	9 (48)	5 (41)	3 (37)	8 (46)
Average precipitation days	18	14	16	15	13	13	12	12	14	16	16	16	175
Source: Weatherbase

== Transport ==
=== Roads ===
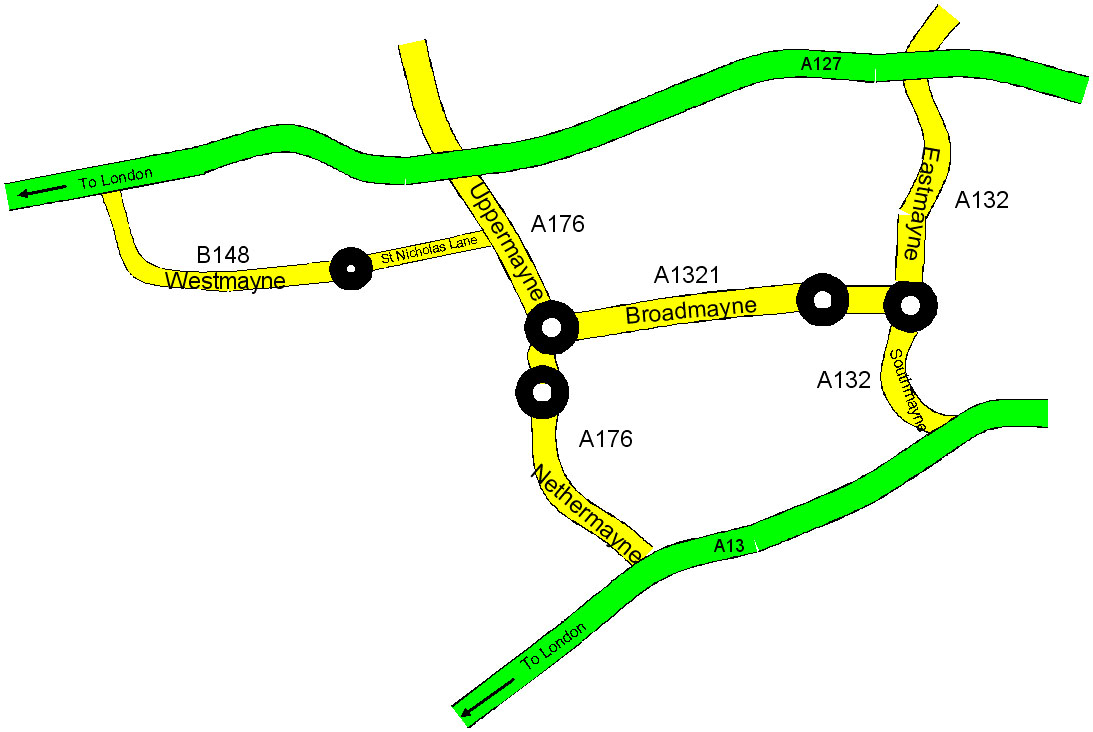
Schematic of the 'Mayne' road network

The two main roads from London to Southend, the A13 and A127, pass to the south and north of the town respectively. Both are important commuter trunk roads, allowing direct access to the M25 and the rest of the motorway network. Locally, the A13 gives access to Pitsea and Vange; the A127 gives access to Basildon town centre and Laindon.

Within the town are six main roads which link to and from the A13 and A127; all of them include the word 'Mayne' in their names:

- Nether Mayne runs from the town centre to the A13 at Five Bells junction, just west of Vange
- Upper Mayne runs from the town centre to the A127 in the north-east corner of Laindon. Both this road and Nether Mayne form part of the A176, which continues north to Billericay
- South Mayne runs from Northlands Park to the A13 at Pitsea
- East Mayne runs from Northlands Park to the A127 near Noke Wood. Both this road and South Mayne form part of the A132, which continues north to Wickford
- Broadmayne runs from the town centre to Northlands Park, connecting the four aforementioned roads. It forms the A1321
- West Mayne runs from the centre of Laindon to the A127 at Dunton Wayletts. It forms part of the B148, which continues east from Laindon to Upper Mayne.

=== Railway ===
The town has three stations on the London, Tilbury and Southend line: Pitsea, Basildon and Laindon. The town is well connected in the county to the City of London and the Docklands financial and corporate headquarters districts, with a 36–58 minute journey from the three Basildon stations to Fenchurch Street. All are served by c2c trains running between Fenchurch Street and Shoeburyness; trains serving Basildon and Laindon stations run via Upminster.

=== Buses ===
Most bus services are provided by First Essex, which connect Basildon to nearby towns and cities. Other providers are Stephensons of Essex and NIBS Buses.

=== Major transport investments ===
==== A127, Basildon Enterprise Corridor ====
Basildon Enterprise Corridor
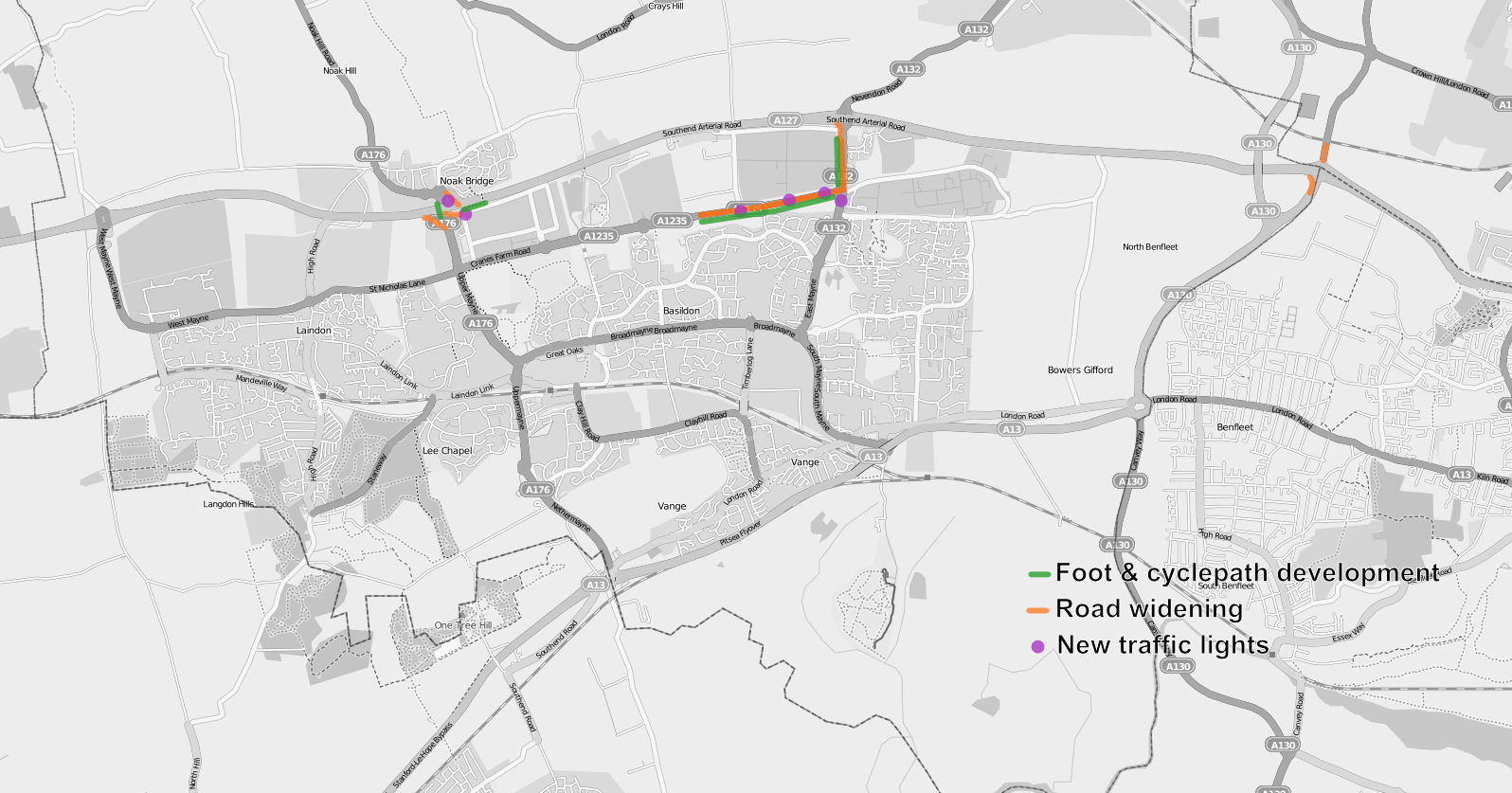
- Location: Essex
- Proposer: Essex County Council
- Cost estimate: £14.7m
- Completion date: March 2011

As part of Basildon's redevelopment, Essex County Council had proposed that the A127 undergo significant development at a cost of £15 million, which was expected to be finished by March 2011. It was funded via the Community Infrastructure Fund (CIF). The project was completed and was divided into three sections:

- Section 1 – Eastmayne. Implementation of an additional lane northbound (600 metres approx.) and new drainage and footpath realignment.
- Section 2 – Cranes Farm Road. Included dualling of the existing carriageway of which was already there (approx. 1500m) and enhancing and upgrading junctions – with the creation of a dedicated left turn lane at the roundabout at Eastmayne to help ease traffic flows during busy hours at the junction.
- Section 3 – Introduction of a new A176 junction at Pipps Hill. This included upgrading the east and westbound off slips to increase the capacity of vehicles and ease traffic flows. The implementation of queue detection and advanced warning signs was also added to this section of the road. Part of section 3 also saw the introduction of the new Hollywood sign for Basildon at the A176 junction.

== Education ==
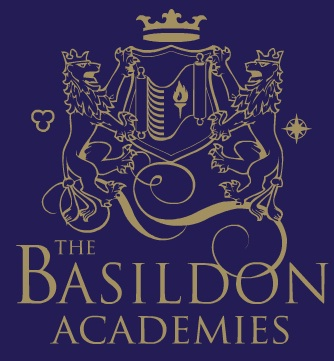
The logo of the Basildon Academies

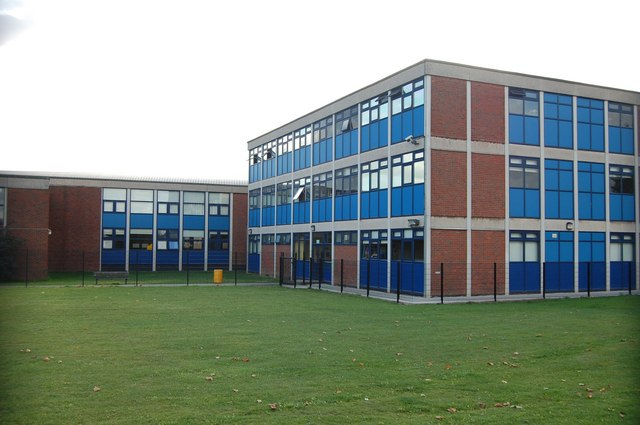
James Hornsby School

There are several secondary schools in the Basildon district:

- Basildon Academies
- De La Salle School
- James Hornsby School
- Woodlands School

Basildon also has two further education colleges:

- South Essex College - located in the town centre. It was originally located at Nethermayne (formerly Thurrock and Basildon College) near Basildon University Hospital.
- PROCAT – an engineering and construction FE college (formerly Prospects College) based at Pipps Hill.

New Campus Basildon, formerly part of SEEVIC, was based in Church Walk. It was announced in January 2017 that the college would be closing from September 2017.

Essex County Council's Adult Community Learning service, ACL is based at Ely House, Churchill Avenue, while there are several private providers delivering apprenticeship, traineeship and business training.

== Sport ==
Basildon has three senior men's football clubs:

- Bowers & Pitsea F.C. play in the Isthmian League Premier
- Basildon United play in the Isthmian League North Division
- Basildon Town, which plays in the Essex Olympian Football League. Basildon also has a senior ladies team, Hashtag United Women F.C. (formerly AFC Basildon), who play in the National League Southern Premier.

In rugby, the town is represented in the London 2 North East League by Basildon R.F.C., while there is only local cricket played at Basildon and Pitsea C.C. in the Shepherd Neame Essex League Division 3. Basildon is home to the South Essex Gymnastics Club, where Olympic champion Max Whitlock trains.

The town's main sporting facility is the Basildon Sporting Village, that opened in 2011 and is based in Gloucester Park. The Village consists of an Olympic-sized swimming pool, 8 court sports hall, a climbing wall, athletics track and is home to the South Essex Gymnastics Club. It was revealed in 2014 that more people swim in Basildon than anywhere else in the county and that 3.5 million people had visited the centre since it had opened. There are also smaller leisure centres, named The Place and Eversley Centre, located in Pitsea, which opened during the 1980s.

Basildon golf course is based in the Kingswood district of the town.

== Entertainment and culture ==
A 2024 analysis by The Economist found Basildon to be the "most typical place in Britain'.

=== Shopping ===
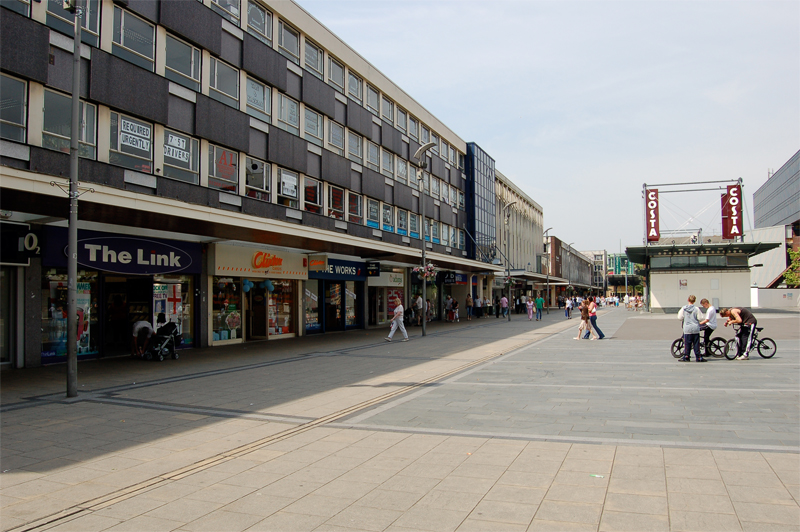
Basildon Town Square looking West

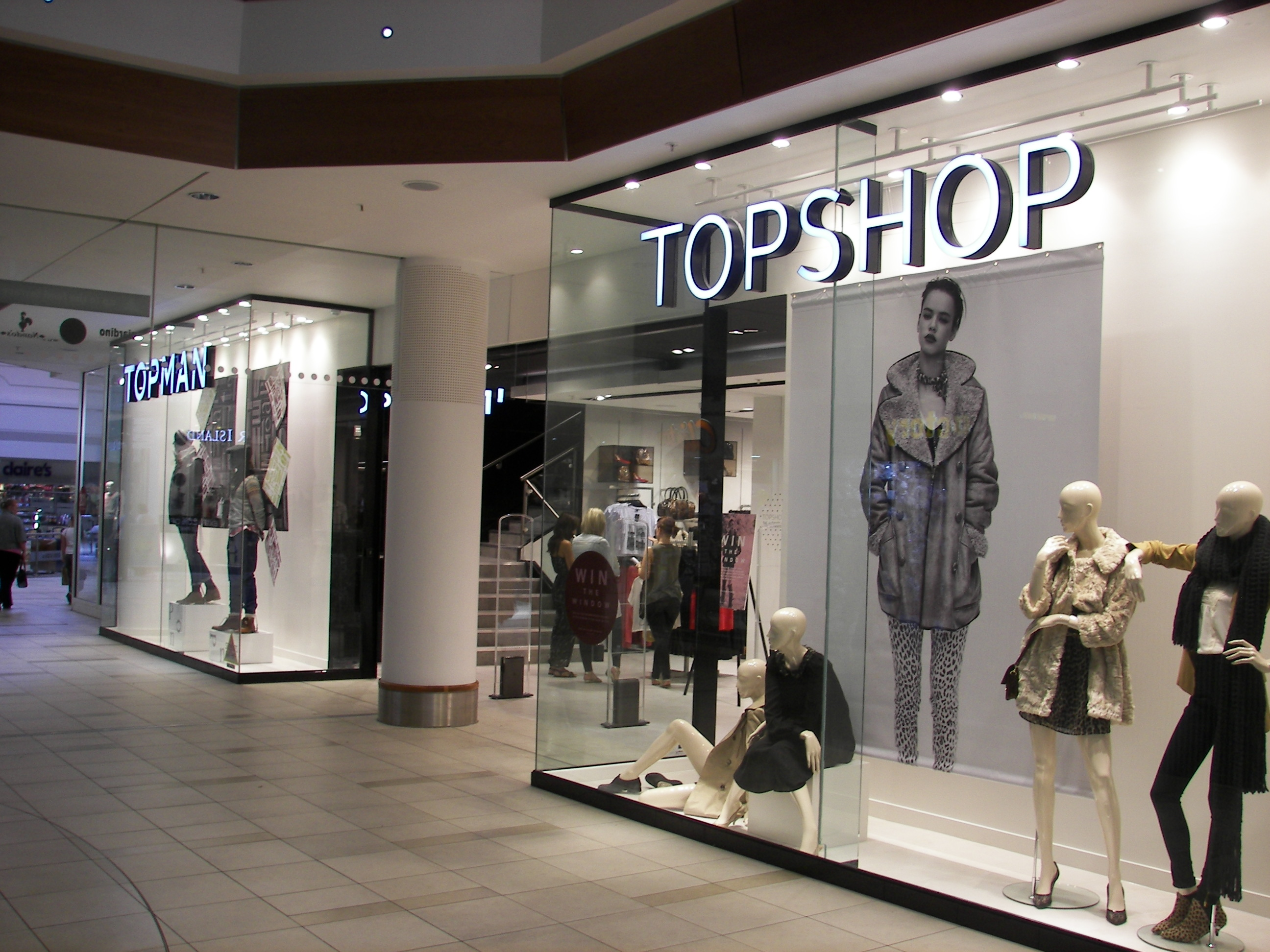
Shops in the Eastgate Shopping Centre

The town centre has a variety of high street stores. As well as shops and coffee houses in the open air East Walk and Town Square, there is the covered Eastgate Shopping Centre which is home to over 100 retailers.

When Eastgate was completed in 1985, it was the largest covered shopping centre in Europe until the opening of the Metro Centre. Eastgate has undergone a number of facelifts since 1985, with its most recent substantial refurbishment in 2007 at a cost of more than £10m.

Further shopping facilities in the town can be found at Westgate Shopping Park, while there is a pavement market selling fresh fruit and vegetables as well as household goods, which in 2018 moved to a new location in St. Martins Square.

Outside of the town centre there are retail parks at Pipps Hill and Mayflower on the A127, while there are smaller shopping centres in Laindon and Pitsea, which is home to a famous market that opened in the 1920s. There are several smaller shopping areas located in each of the communities.

=== Festival Leisure Park ===
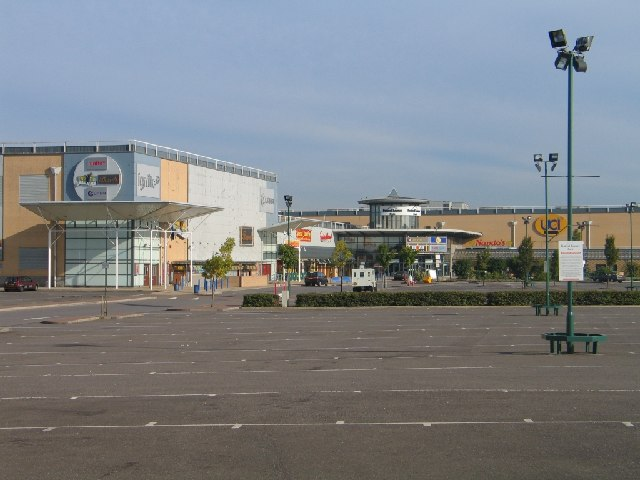
Festival Leisure Park also known as "Bas Vegas"

Festival Leisure Park is a trading leisure park located in the north of Basildon and owned by Aviva. The Festival Leisure Park, includes 15 restaurants, a bowling and arcade centre, a family and entertainment centre with play frame and dodgem car track, two hotels, a bar, a sixteen screen Cineworld cinema and two health clubs. The Festival Leisure Park is colloquially known as "Bas Vegas". The name originated from a proposed Casino development on the site. The site was previously home to the Aquatels park which hosted a zoo, ski slope and golf range that opened in 1972, which was replaced in 1982 by a conference venue called the Festival Hall which was home to the MFI World Matchplay darts championship.

A wakeboarding complex also opened in 2012, attracting both professionals and amateurs alike

=== Theatre ===
The Arts Centre was the first theatre in Basildon, opening in 1968 in a temporary facility behind the then temporary council offices, on the site of the current Westgate shopping park. This was renamed 'The Towngate Theatre and Arts Centre' in 1976, before being replaced by a new purpose built theatre as part of the new Basildon Centre, on the opposite side for the former Towngate Road.

In 1989, the culture and history of the town was documented by the newly re-opened Towngate Theatre, when it commissioned a community play from Arnold Wesker for the town's 40th anniversary. The potted history that Wesker called "Boerthel's Hill" was acted out by a 125 members of the community recording a fascinating history of London's East Enders, who were the first Basildon residents.

=== Cinema ===
Basildon currently has two cinemas: Cineworld and Vue. The former was owned previously by Empire Cinemas, but was purchased as part of $124m deal to purchase five cinemas; it had opened originally as a UCI.

Previously, Basildon had an ABC Cinema, which was built in 1971 and was based in North Gunnells. This changed hands several times becoming a Cannon and a Robins cinema before closing in 1999. The building until August 2022 was home to the British Heart Foundation store. Prior to this, a cinema in Pitsea, originally called The Broadway from 1930, before changing its name in 1955 as The Century, operated until its closure in 1966 when it was converted to a Bingo hall.

In 2018, planning permission was granted for a new ten screen Empire cinema, along with new restaurants on the site of Freedom House in Basildon town centre, with demolition of the current buildings on site starting in 2019. As of January 2023, the partially completed cinema has not opened. As of July 2024, the cinema was opened under Vue's management.

=== Libraries and museums ===
Basildon Central Library is now based in the Basildon Centre (since 1989), but had previously been in prefabs next to the temporary council offices on Fodderwick. There are also numerous smaller libraries across Basildon: Clay Hill Road in Vange, Pitsea Centre in Pitsea, Fryerns Library in Whitmore Way, and Laindon Library on New Century Road Laindon.

Basildon is home to the Haven Plotlands Museum and was previously home to the National Motorboat Museum, which had been based at Wat Tyler Park. Currently there is not a museum dedicated to the history of Basildon, though plans had previously been made to site one at Wat Tyler Park. As of 2018 there is still a campaign to have a museum created.

=== Parks and recreations grounds ===
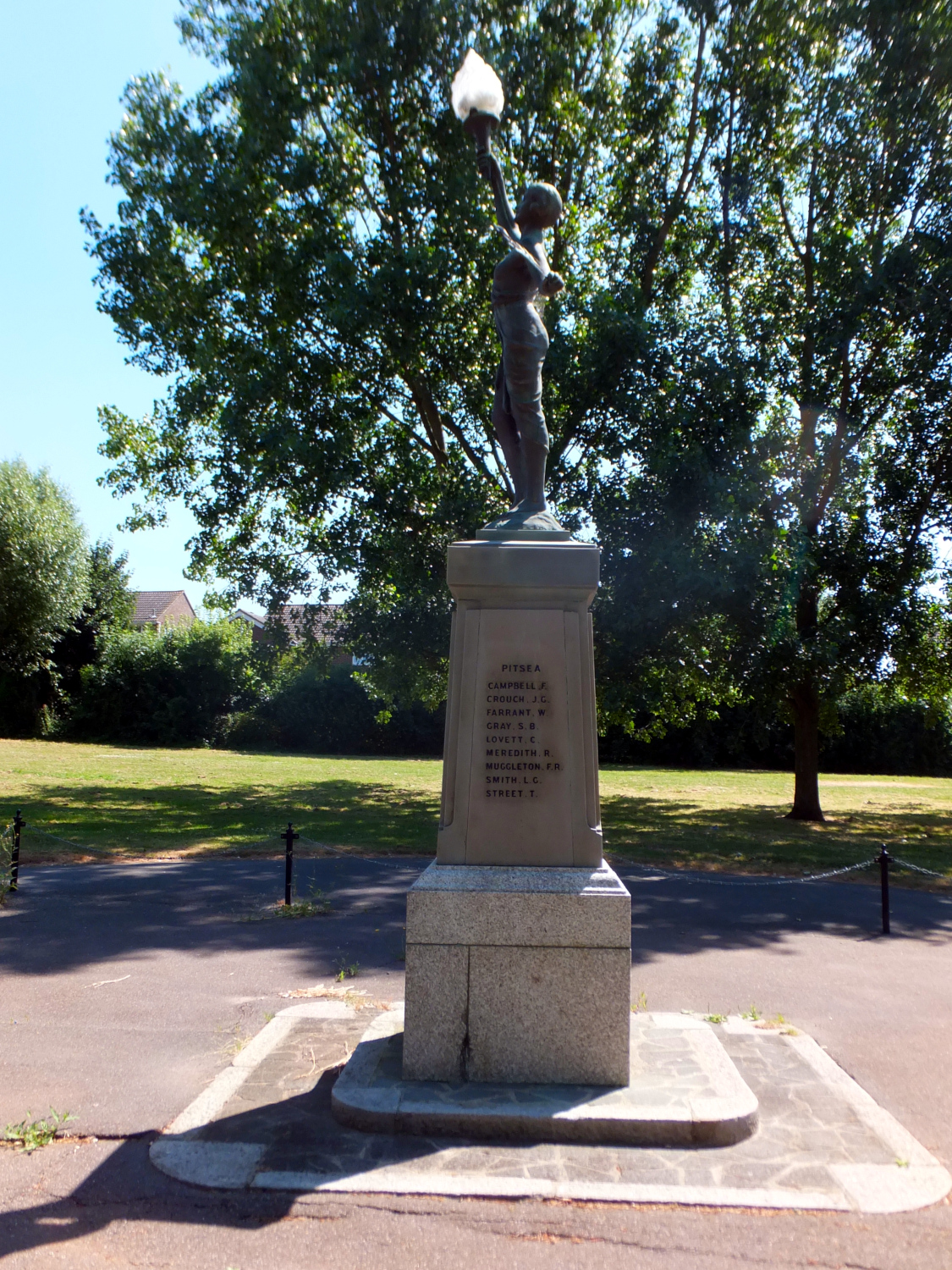
Pitsea War Memorial in Howards Park (Grade II)

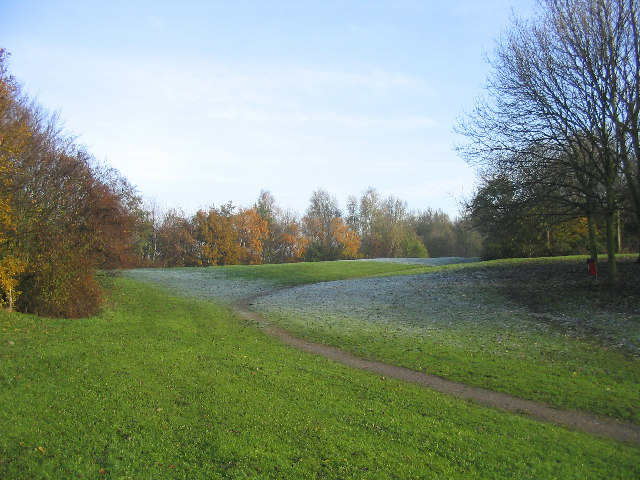
Northlands Park

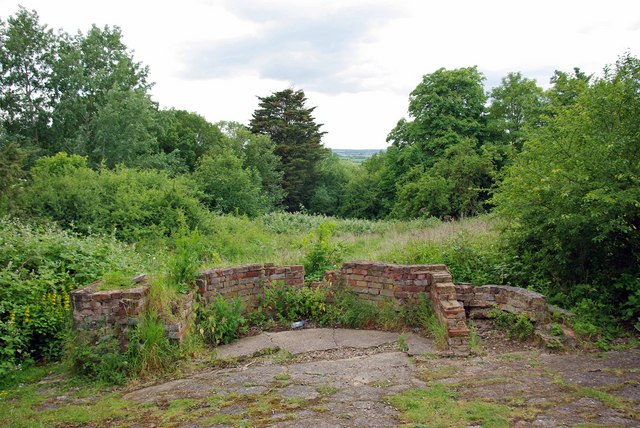
Langdon Nature Reserve

Basildon was designed with large amounts of green spaces with Gloucester Park dominating the centre of Basildon. Kent View Recreation ground in Vange and Northlands Park in Pitsea are the other large green spaces. Other formal parks include Mopsies Park in Timberlog Lane, and Howards Park in Pitsea.

Basildon is also home to Wat Tyler Country Park which opened in 1984; Marks Hill Nature Reserve (opened 1981); Vange Hill; One Tree Hill Country Park; Langdon Hill Country Parks and the RSPB Nature Reserve at Bowers Marshes. Essex Wildlife Trust run a large reserve at Langdon.

=== Heritage ===
Even though Basildon is a new town, there are still traces of its historical past visible. Old roads that once connected the villages have been incorporated into the new town: Clay Hill Road, Timberlog Lane, Rectory Road, Pound Lane, Church Road and Dry Street. Dry Street is a perfect example of old Basildon, as it is an undeveloped country lane that runs through One Tree Hill and Langdon Hill Country Parks and is home to several listed properties.

Other than St Martin's Church, most of the historical parish churches still exist. St Nicholas (13th century and Grade I listed) sits proudly over Laindon, from where Basildon can be seen clearly, however St Peter's (13th century Grade II* listed) at Nevendon is hidden behind Sainsbury's and is little known by its residents. St Michael's at Pitsea is said to be 13th century, but was rebuilt in 1870 and now only its Bell Tower remains on Pitsea Mount. The village of Basildon's parish church, Holy Cross (Grade II listed) can still be seen in Church Road, while Vange's 14th-century church All Saints was remodelled in the 19th century and is set back from the London Road and is Grade II listed.

Other buildings of note are: the Barge Inn at Vange; the Broadway at Pitsea, with its mock Tudor architecture built by Harold Howard in 1929; Cromwell Manor, formerly Pitsea Hall Grade II listed, by Pitsea railway station that dates from the 15th century; and Great Chalvedon Hall, Grade II listed and now a pub in Tyefields, which is reputed to date from the 16th century. Nevendon Hall was built in 1789 and is Grade II listed. The moat at the former site of Boetlers, a Tudor house demolished in the 1960s, is located near to Holy Cross Church.

One notable building is Little Coopers Farmhouse, which was originally located in Takeley. It was designated a Grade II building in 1980. In the late 1980s, due to redevelopment, the whole structure was dismantled and re-built at the Wat Tyler Country Park.

On the west side of town, the Dunton Plotlands area was occupied by small rural dwellings in the mid twentieth century. Today, it forms Langdon Nature Reserve.

In 2008, a National Lottery funded heritage trail was started to highlight the 1960s architecture.

=== Media ===
Basildon's local radio stations are BBC Essex, Heart East, Greatest Hits Radio East and its own community radio station, which is aimed towards the residents of Basildon, East Thurrock and its surrounding areas called Gateway 97.8 which broadcasts from the Eastgate Shopping Centre.

Basildon is within the BBC London and ITV London region. Television signals are received from Crystal Palace TV transmitter. BBC East and ITV Anglia can also be received from the Sudbury TV transmitter as well as BBC South East and ITV Meridian from the Bluebell Hill TV transmitter. Basildon Development Corporation had installed a Cable Television service into many of its home, called Rediffusion, but this service stopped during the 1990s. The service was replaced by United Artists Cable which were based in the town; this is now Virgin Media, although the customer service operation closed in the 2000s.

Since 1969, The Evening Echo newspaper offices have been based on the Pipps Hill Industrial Estate. The town has been home to The Yellow Advertiser since 1976.

=== Television ===
Basildon was the setting for the BBC programme White Gold with filming taking place in Basildon Town Centre. Channel 5 programme Extreme Hair Wars was set at JET training academy in Basildon. The fictional character Nellie Bertram, played by Catherine Tate in the US comedy television series The Office was said to have been born in Basildon.

=== Music ===
Basildon had a great influence on the 1980s music scene, with bands Depeche Mode and Yazoo, and later by Alison Moyet in her solo career and Vince Clarke in his role with Erasure.

=== Film ===
The documentary film New Town Utopia by Christopher Ian Smith was made about Basildon. Basildon also hosts Europe's only Underwater film studio that can be inside or out, as it has a removable roof. The studios have been used to film scenes in the Anglo-French drama The Tunnel and for the film 47 Meters Down.

=== Art ===
Basildon was the focus of Magic Party Place by photographer CJ Clarke. "Comprising of a largely white working class community, the town is one of the most statistically average places in England", he said.

=== Poetry and literature ===
Caron Freeborn, (previously Severn), (1966–2019) author, poet and performer, grew up in Basildon and attended Fryerns Comprehensive. Later she attended Lucy Cavendish college at Cambridge as a mature student, then as a teacher/lecturer in creative writing including poetry. Freeborn obtained her master's degree in Renaissance literature. She published three novels: Three Blind Mice (2001), described by Marian Keyes as "a dark and compelling love story of a genre that could be called East End noir"; Prohibitions (2004), a literary thriller again set in the East End; and Presenting … the Fabulous O'Learys (2017), a take on King Lear, updated to the 1980s. Georges Perec is my hero (2015) showcased Freeborn's poetic voice(s). Much of Georges Perec is my hero celebrates the real, the brutal (including embracing the brutalist architecture of Basildon), with many poems and photographs based on the town.

== Modern architecture and design ==
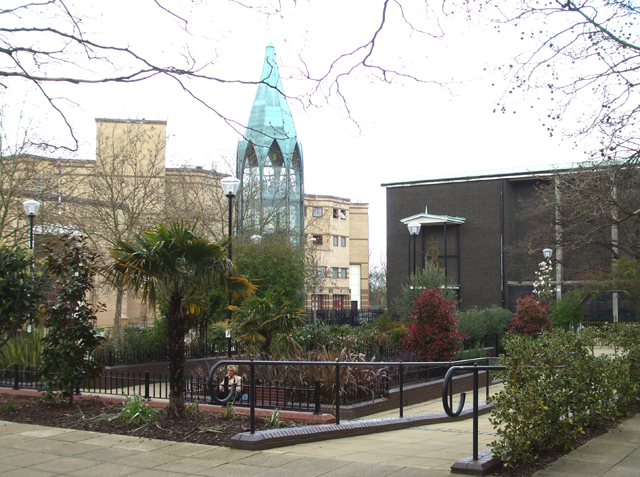
Church Garden: the area in front of St. Martin's Church in Basildon Town Centre is landscaped.

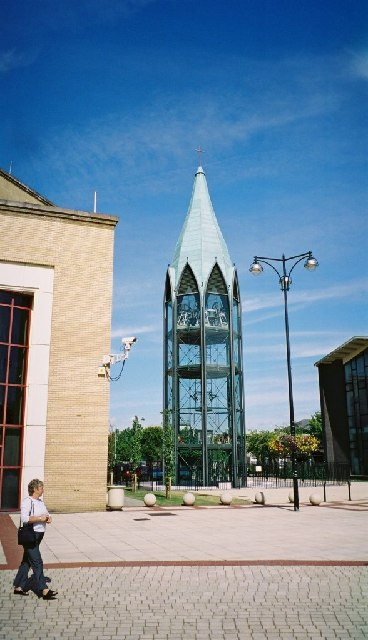
St. Martin's Bell Tower

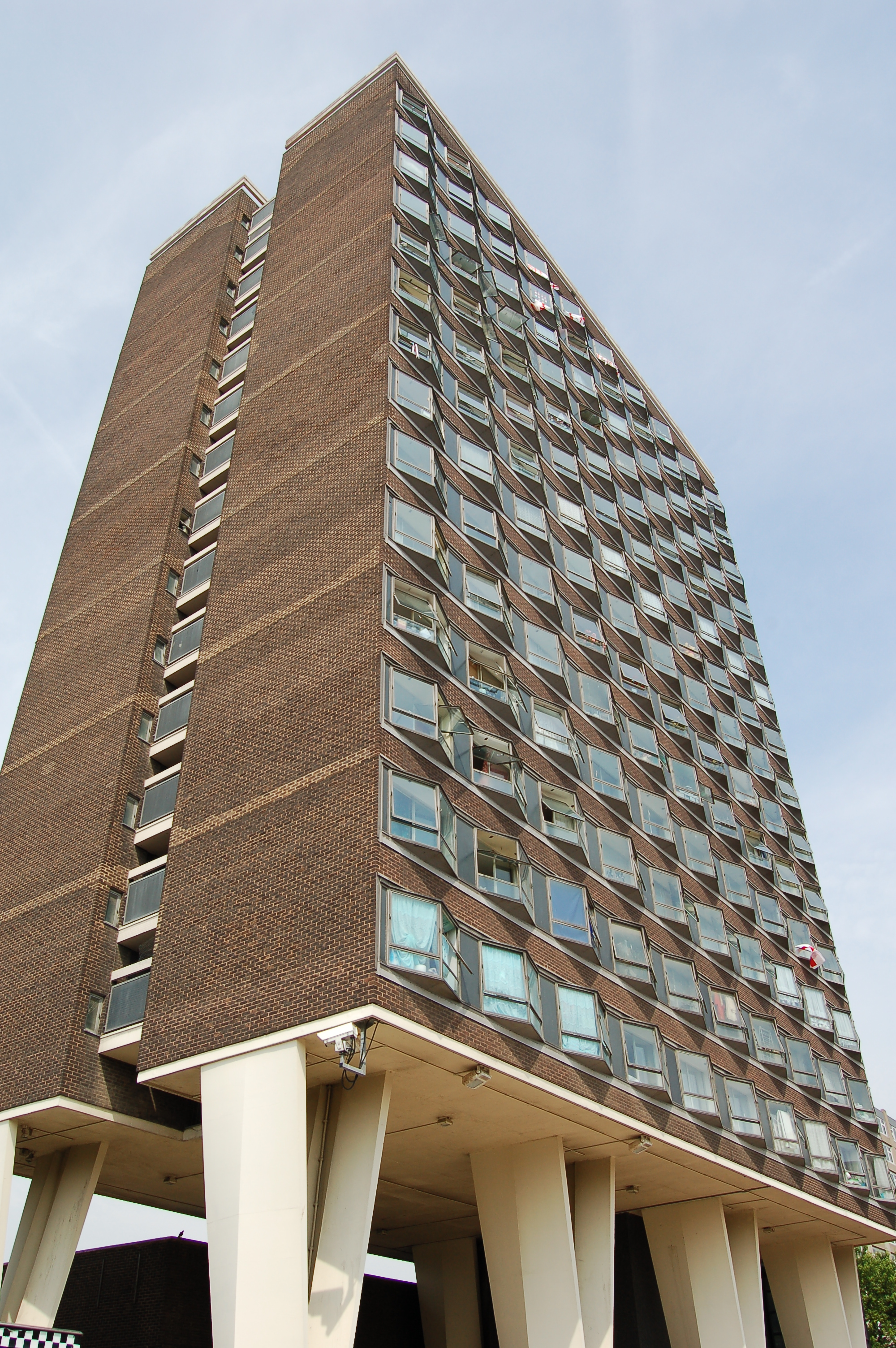
Brooke House, showing its V-shaped pylons

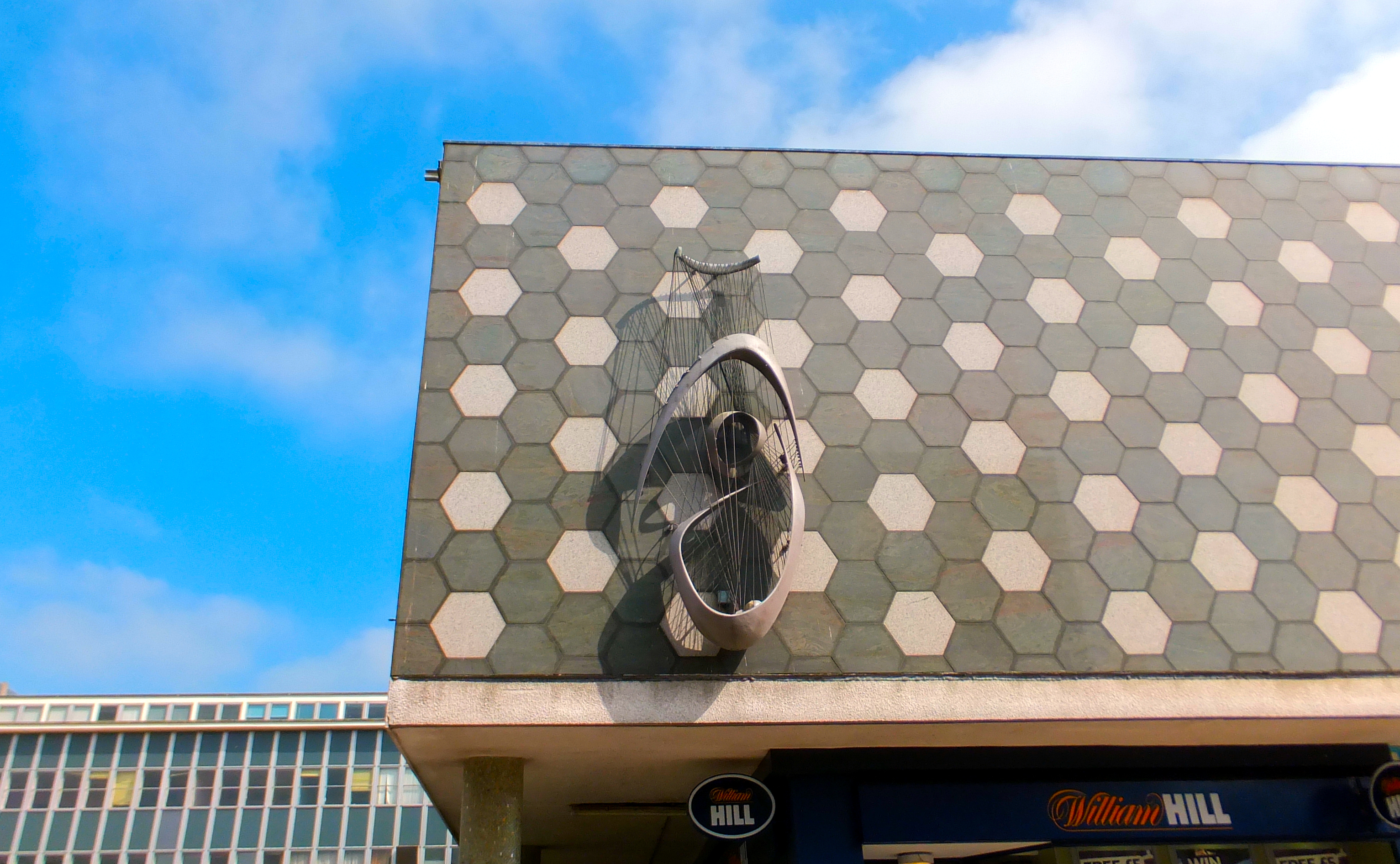
Man Aspires by A. J. Poole

St. Martin's Church in Basildon town centre is a modern structure. The church was consecrated in 1962 by the Bishop of Chelmsford. A freestanding glass bell tower was built in 1999 and opened by Queen Elizabeth II.

Although there are a number of tall buildings in central Basildon, there are also many newly constructed buildings closer to the 'Basildon Enterprise Corridor' situated in North Basildon.

The largest and tallest structure in the new town's town centre is Brooke House, a 49m / 161 ft high 14-storey residential tower block that fronts the west side of the town centre's East Square. Dating from 1962, it was designed by Sir Basil Spence and Anthony B. Davies, with Ove Arup & Partners as the structural engineers. It has a 1960s Brutalist design, elevated on eight massive V-shaped concrete pylons. The building was chosen to have a residential function, as opposed to commercial office space, to retain life in the town centre after the shops had closed. Shops were positioned to the rear of the building, with Brooke House acting as a covered forecourt. It was conceived as a structure to define Basildon's urban status and to act as marker to identify the town centre's location within a largely low-rise settlement set in a flat landscape. It was named after the then Minister of Housing and Local Government, Henry Brooke. The building was given Grade II listing in 1998.

East of Brooke House is East Square, a sunken open-air public plaza accessed from Brooke House by a monumental staircase and a curved ramp which was listed in 1998 as Grade II. Formerly the east side of the square was fronted by Freedom House, containing shops on two levels, and the north side by the Post Office building, a 5-story structure. Formerly on the wall of Freedom House is the oldest piece of public sculpture in the new town: installed in 1957, it is a wire and aluminium relief by the sculptor John Poole titled Man Aspires. The whole ensemble was designed to create a formal setting for Brooke House, and had a similar Brutalist design, though softened by other architectural features. Freedom House was demolished, along with the Post Office building as part of the new cinema construction in 2019. The town centre extends from East Square towards the south-west. Down the middle of this zone runs a rectangular raised pool. Within the pool is a bronze sculpture and fountain, titled "Mother and Child", by the sculptor Maurice Lambert and dating from 1959 which was listed as Grade II in 1998.

On the upper level of Eastgate is the Cats Cradle Pussiwillow III Clock. It was created by Rowland Emett in 1981 and was originally placed outside what is now ASDA on the Lower Mall of the shopping centre. It was officially unveiled by Michael Bentine.

The Barstable School building first opened on 1 March 1962 and was designed by the Finnish-British architect Cyril Mardall (of YRM Architects, Yorke, Rosenberg and Mardall). The building was listed in 1993 and is Grade II listed. It is now home to the lower school of the Basildon Academies.

== Regeneration ==
Basildon has gone through several regenerations – a few highlights are:

- Investment in the Basildon Enterprise Corridor, a large business area.
- The creation of a new wetland nature reserve in the Thames Marshes by the Royal Society for the Protection of Birds (RSPB), the Land Restoration Trust, Basildon District Council and Veolia.
- A review of the district's housing, with investment in housing estates such as Craylands, Five Links and Felmores which will be re-designed to allow for less trouble and having more streets with roads, rather than a street with just pavement.
- The regeneration of Pitsea town centre.

Some future plans include:

- The regeneration of Basildon and Laindon town centres.
- The creation of a health and education research centre near Basildon University Hospital.
- There is a proposal for creating Dunton Garden Suburb on land between Basildon and Brentwood. This proposal may have 6,000 homes, together with retail, commercial and leisure uses. This is a joint proposal of the two councils and a public consultation ended in March 2015. The proposal has been met with criticism from all political parties and the residents group Residents Against Inappropriate Development
- In 2018 planning permission was granted for a new 10 screen Empire Cinema along with new restaurants on the site of Freedom House in Basildon town centre.

== Twinning ==
Basildon's twin towns include:

- Heiligenhaus (Germany)
- Meaux (France)

== Notable people ==
- Perry Bamonte – guitarist, The Cure
- Andy Barcham – footballer
- Jay Howard – racing driver
- Brian Belo – winner of Big Brother 2007
- Stuart Bingham – former World champion snooker player.
- Emma Blackery – singer-songwriter and YouTuber
- Daniel Brooks golfer on the European Tour
- Darren Caskey – ex-Tottenham Hotspur F.C. and Reading F.C. footballer
- Keith Chapman – creator of Bob the Builder
- Mark Crick – photographer and author
- Depeche Mode – electronic music band, formed in 1980 in Basildon
  - Martin Gore
  - Andy Fletcher
  - Dave Gahan
  - Vince Clarke – currently a member of Erasure
- Bob Downs – former professional cyclist
- Josh Dubovie – singer, Eurovision Song Contest 2010 in Oslo, Norway
- Ritchie Edhouse - darts player and winner of the 2024 European Championship.
- Justin Edinburgh – ex-Tottenham Hotspur F.C. Portsmouth F.C. and Southend United F.C.
- Sophie Hinchliffe – cleaning
- Michael Kightly – footballer, Wolverhampton Wanderers, Southend United and Grays Athletic
- Kunt and the Gang – musical comedian
- Robert Marlow – singer
- Terry Marsh – boxer
- Eamonn Martin – athlete and winner of the 1993 London Marathon elite men's race
- Conor Mason – singer-songwriter and guitarist from Nothing but Thieves
- Alison Moyet – singer
- QBoy – rapper
- Gemma Ray – musician, singer, composer and producer
- Scott Robinson, singer from Five
- Simon Segars – CEO ARM Holdings, born in Basildon, went to Woodlands School
- Joan Sims – actress
- Casey Stoney – head coach of NWSL's San Diego Wave FC & former professional footballer
- Ellie Taylor – British comedian
- Kara Tointon – actress, Dawn Swann in EastEnders and film The Football Factory
- James Tomkins – footballer, West Ham United FC
- Denise Van Outen – actress
- Vincent O'Connell - playwright, film maker
- Fakemink - rapper, producer

== See also ==
- New Holland Agriculture
