= Wat Tyler Country Park =

Country park in Essex, England

Coordinates: 51.548524°N 0.505723°E

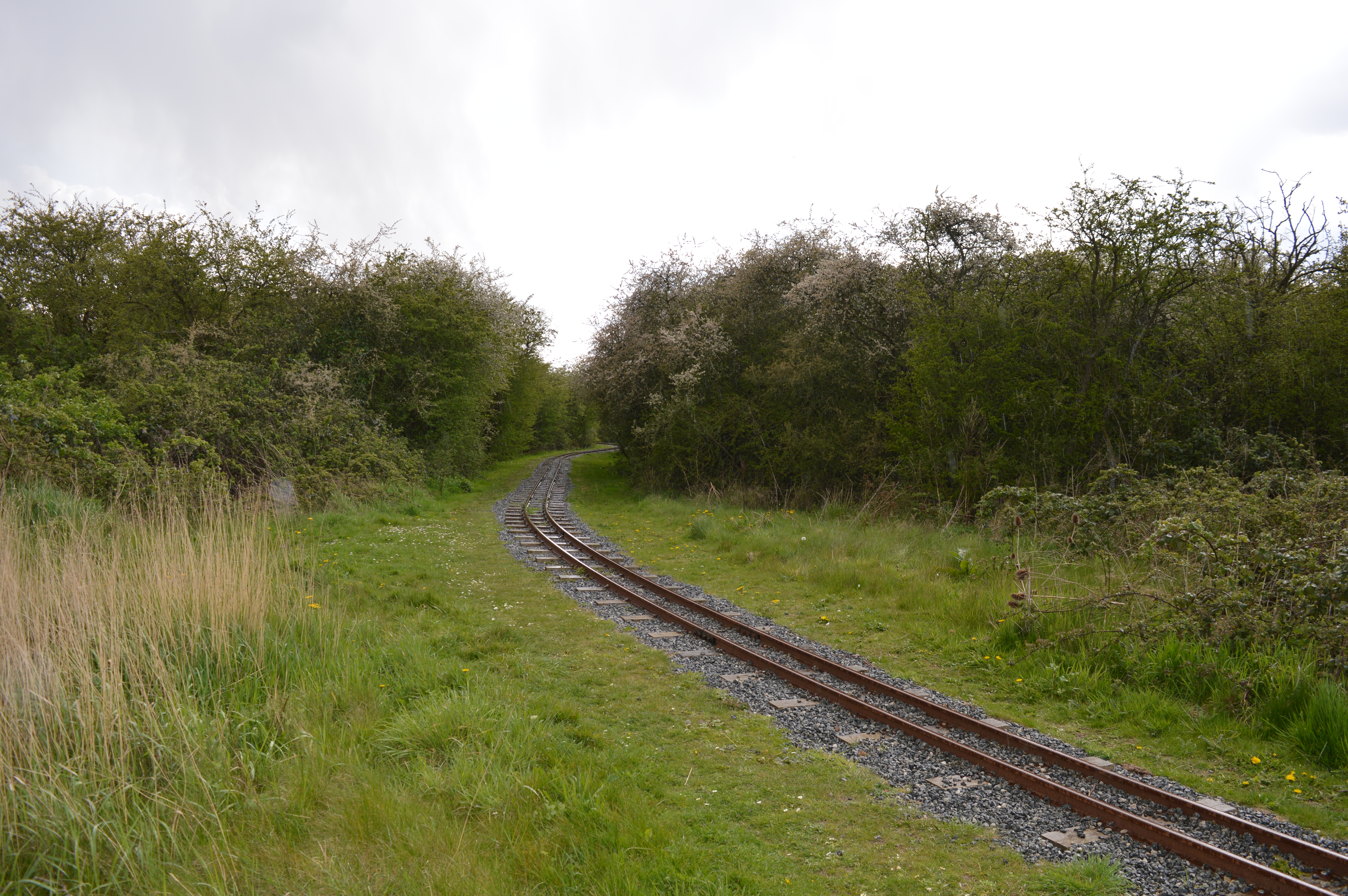
The miniature railway at Wat Tyler Country Park.

Wat Tyler Country Park is a country park located to the south of Pitsea, Essex within the area of Pitsea Marsh. The area was inhabited from the Bronze Age onwards and at one time was the location of the Pitsea Explosives Factory.

The park is named after Wat Tyler, the leader of the Peasants' Revolt in 1381, which started in nearby Fobbing before spreading to London. The Revolt failed and Tyler was killed, but he is remembered as a people's champion against the rich and powerful.

Facilities include the RSPB Wildlife Garden and Visitor Centre, and a miniature railway.

Little Coopers Farmhouse that was originally located in Takeley was designated a Grade II building in 1980. In the late 1980s due to redevelopment, the whole structure was dismantled and re-built at the Wat Tyler Country Park.

The park contains a miniature railway which in 2012 had four platforms and 1.2 km of track. The railway closed in 2019, but was reopened in 2025 after a refurbishment costing over £50,000.
