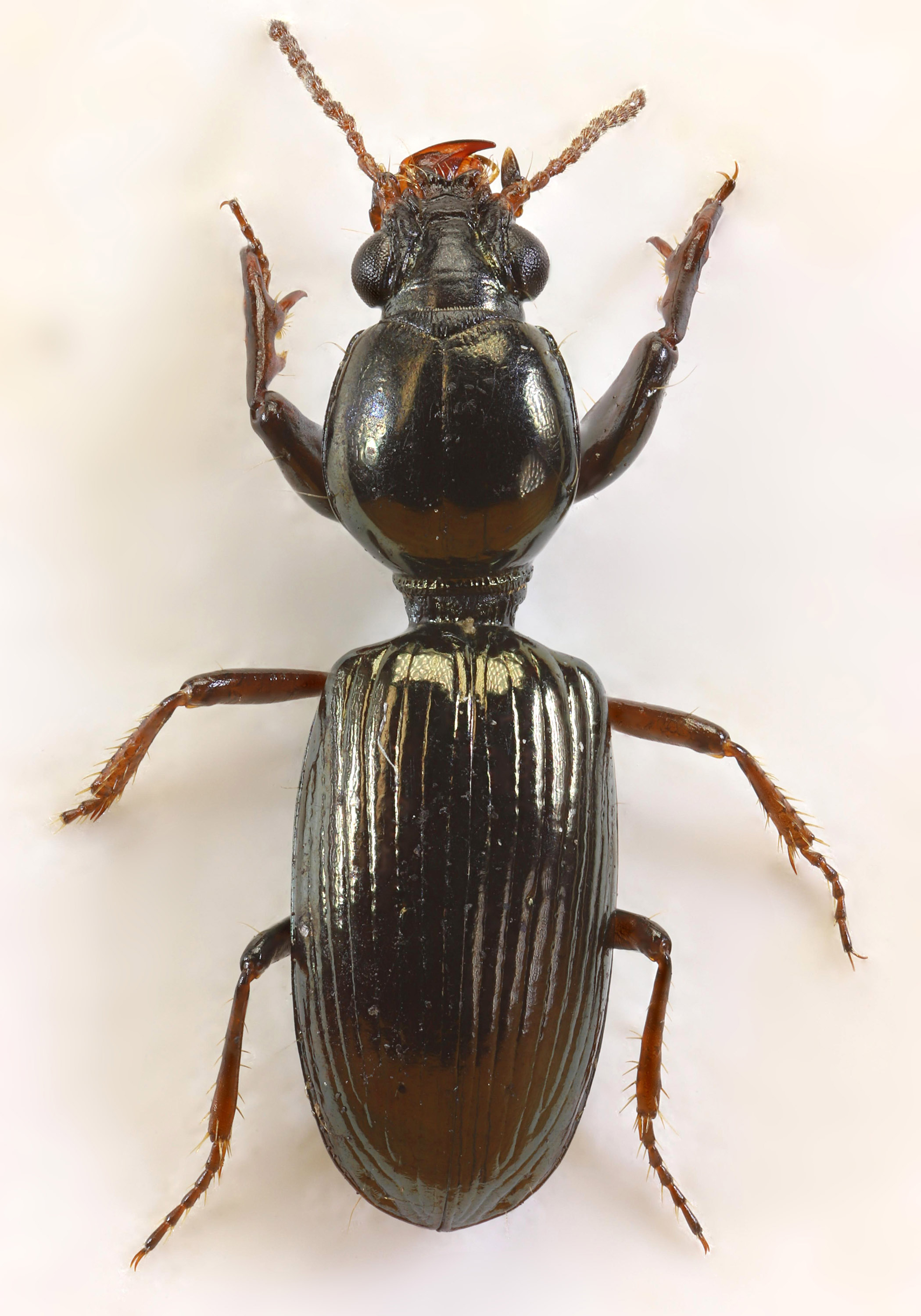

Scientific classification
- Kingdom: Animalia
- Phylum: Arthropoda
- Class: Insecta
- Order: Coleoptera
- Suborder: Adephaga
- Family: Carabidae
- Genus: Dyschirius
- Species: D. impunctipennis

Binomial name
- Dyschirius impunctipennis J. F. Dawson, 1854

= Dyschirius impunctipennis =

Species of beetle

Dyschirius impunctipennis is a species of ground beetle in the subfamily Scaritinae. It was described by Dawson in 1854.
