= Basildon Town Centre =

Commercial centre of Basildon

Coordinates: 51.570°N 0.455°E

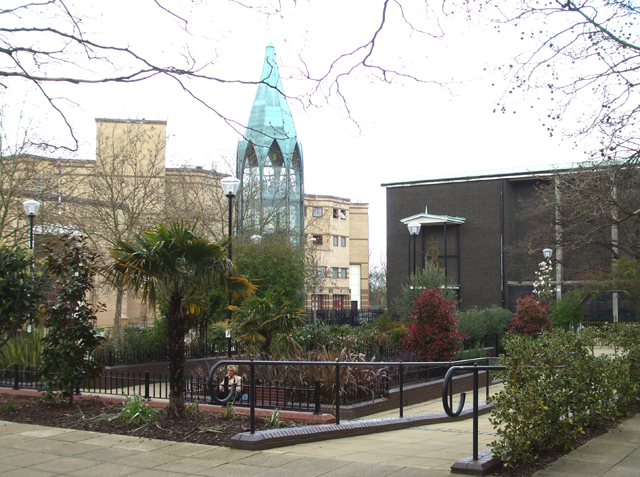
The St Martin's Belltower in Basildon Town Centre was officially opened by Queen Elizabeth II and is claimed to be "the world’s first and only glass bell tower".

Basildon Town Centre is a planned town centre developed during the creation of the town of Basildon, Essex, in the 1950s. The architect Sir Basil Spence worked on its design.

== History ==
Basildon was one of England's first post WW2 new towns: it was officially named a new town in 1949, under the New Towns Act, with the first house constructed in 1951. A large illuminated sign stood next to the railway line stating "This is the site of Basildon Town Centre" from 1956, with the first shops in Basildon Town Centre opening to the public in 1958. Initially only the Town Square (south side), Market Square & Pavement and half of East Walk were opened with several business based in portacabins (Barclays Bank for one). The north side of Town Square and South Walk opened in 1959, followed by the second phase of East Walk in 1961. Block S which closed the west end of Town Square was completed in 1971.

By 1971 Basildon Town Centre comprised 70 acres (280,000 m^{2}) and 205 stores of all sizes totalling 1,100,000 sq ft (100,000 m^{2}) of retail space. It was one of the largest pedestrian precincts in Britain, with entertainment and leisure facilities, an open-air market, car parking for 5,000 vehicles and bus and railway stations. Its anchor stores were London Co-operative Society, Taylors department store, Littlewoods and Marks & Spencer.

However, by the mid-1970s, shopping and commercial facilities had not kept pace with an expanding population and increased visitors. A decision was therefore taken by Basildon Development Corporation to dedicate more space to better shopping facilities to give Basildon added status as a major town centre for retailers leading to the building of the Eastgate Centre.

== Eastgate Basildon ==
Eastgate Basildon
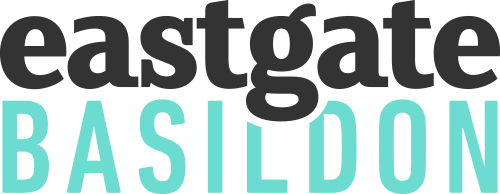

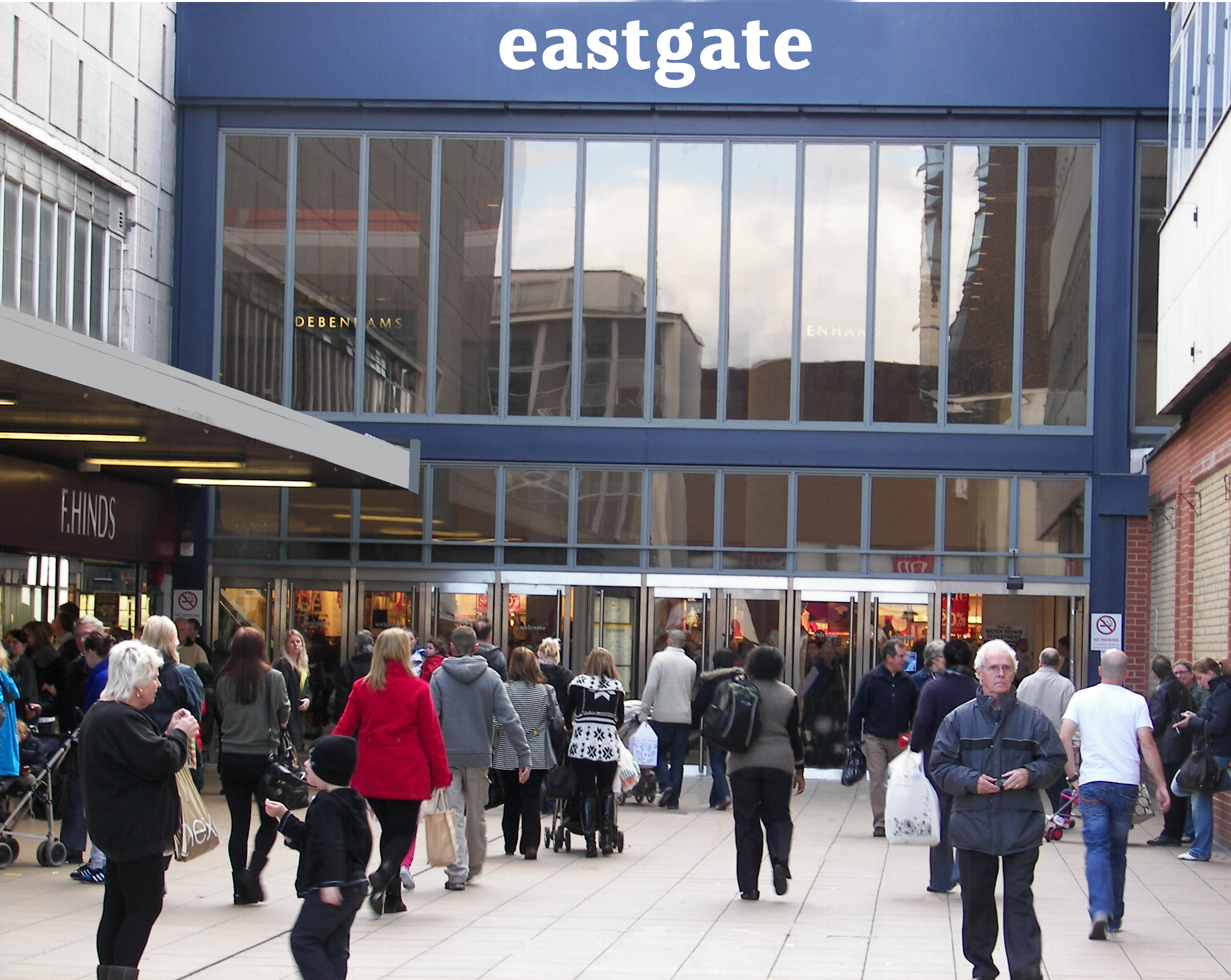
Entrance to Eastgate from Basildon Town Square.

During the 1980s Eastgate Basildon (formerly Eastgate International Shopping Centre) was built in two phases. At the time it was the largest indoor shopping centre in Europe and brought 2,000 jobs to the area. Eastgate Shopping Centre was opened in stages between 1980 and 1985. The first phase opened in 1980 with the first store to open being SavaCentre. The first phase included the shop units on the former road Nether Priors (units 1-5 the original structures can be seen at the rear in the delivery bay) onto which Eastgate phase 1 was built. Phase 2 of development was started in 1982 by J Laing and was completed in 1985 on the site of the Southernhay car park. The centre was officially opened to much acclaim by Prince Edward, with the anchor store being Allders department store. The original owner of Eastgate was Norwich Union who moved into offices on the site shortly after it opened. Today, Eastgate is owned by InfraRed Capital Partners. Today Eastgate pulls in over 1 million visitors a month.

Eastgate has undergone a number of facelifts since 1985. Its most recent substantial refurbishment was in 2007, at a cost of more than £10m, which included the opening of new toilets and baby care facilities, and replacing lifts, lighting, escalators, floors and fascias, plus a completely redesigned Food Terrace area with expanded seating for around 50% more covers. In 2012 Eastgate's multi story car park underwent a major refurbishment including new lighting, bigger parking spaces, new tarmac and a new paint scheme. The centre has over 2000 car parking spaces, a third of the town centre's 6000 spaces. Eastgate’s anchor store is Asda (opened 2002).

Eastgate owners, Infrared Capital Partners, announced in November 2014 that they planned to redevelop the Galleries and upper levels of the shopping centre into a £15 million 15 screen cinema with a scheduled completion date of 2017. However this has now been cancelled as the council had announced its own plans for a cinema complex in the town centre. On the 22nd of November 2021 InfraRed the company that owns Eastgate Shopping centre entered in to administration due to the Coronavirus pandemic saw its high-profile shops like Topshop, Debenhams and Build a Bear cease trading earlier in the year.

== Transport ==
Basildon bus station was opened on its current site Southernhay in 1958 although it only was a double parallel island arrangement and South Walk shops had not yet been developed. In 1966 a new "saw tooth" arrangement was added fronting onto the South Walk shops. With the completion of Eastgate in 1985, the bus station had a new closed-in weatherproof fascia added which is still in place today. Since 1990 a taxi rank has been operational with the bus station.

Basildon railway station is on the c2c line and opened in 1974. It was refurbished in both the 1990s and 2000s.

The town centre currently has 10 operational car parks that can hold more than 6000 cars. All car parks charge fees Monday to Saturday but, as of November 2015, parking on Sunday was made free.

== Features ==
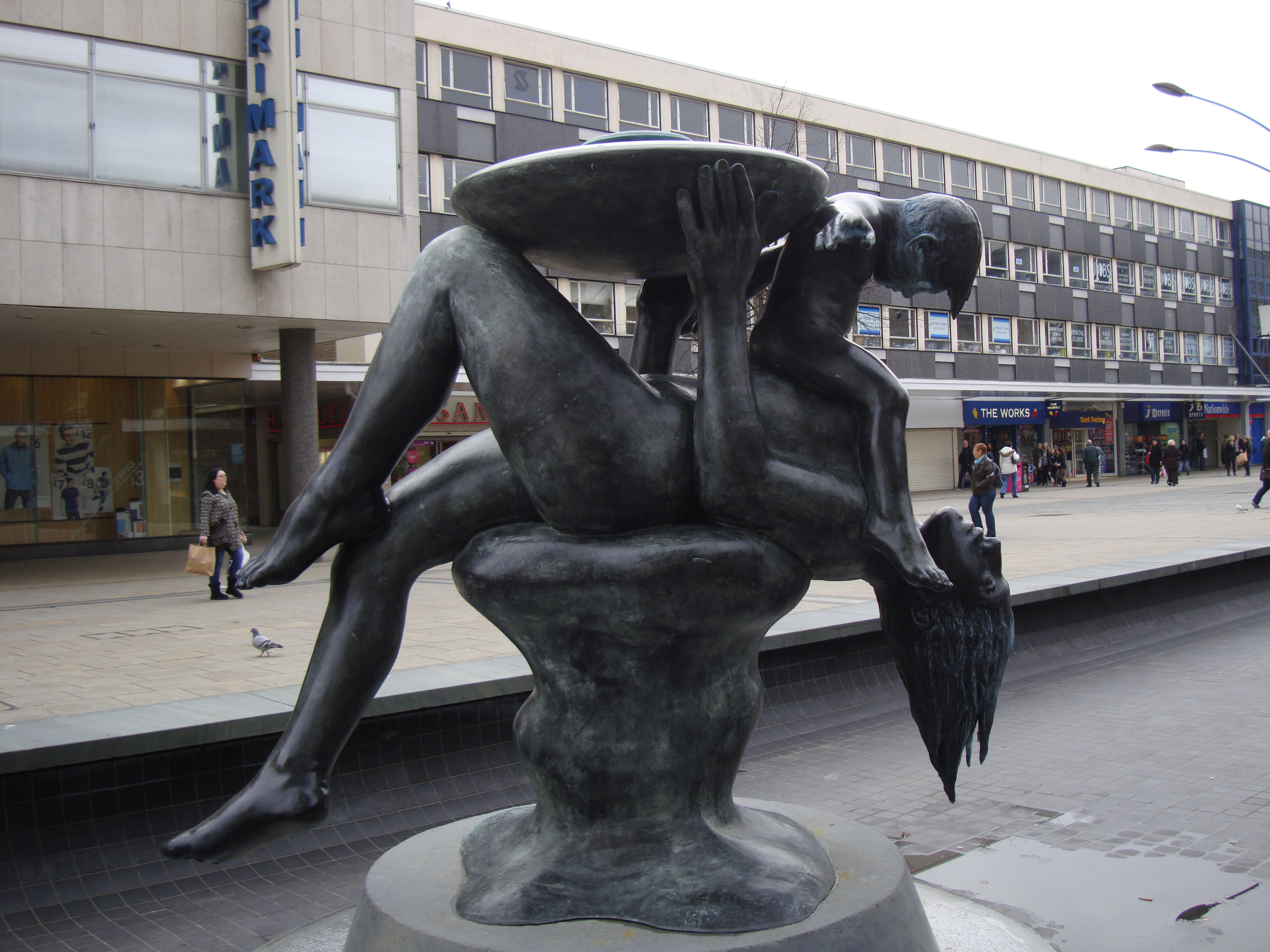
The Mother and Child fountain in Basildon Town Centre.

Located on the ground floor of Eastgate is a plaque commemorating the opening with a time capsule. A copy of the Evening Echo of the day it opened is thought to be inside.

On the Upper level of Eastgate is the Cats Cradle Pussiwillow III Clock. It was created by Rowland Emett in 1981. and was originally placed outside what is now ASDA on the Lower Mall of the shopping centre. It was officially unveiled by Michael Bentine.

The clock is one of a number of notable Basildon works of contemporary art. The Mother and Child statue in the Town Square was created by Maurice Lambert and is Grade II listed. It was commissioned in 1959 to symbolise the growth of Basildon as a New Town. Above the Bus Station, just outside Eastgate, is a 315 ft (96 m) x 13 ft (4.0 m) mosaic of 16,000 individual tiles created by the artist John Gordon in the 1960s. On a wall of Freedom House in East Walk is the oldest piece of public sculpture in the new town: installed in 1957, it is a wire and aluminium relief by the sculptor A. J. Poole titled "Man Aspires".

Slightly further away from the shopping centre stands St. Martin's Bell Tower, a glass tower, unveiled by Queen Elizabeth II on 12 March 1999.

== Community radio ==
In December 2003 and December 2004 a radio station, Eastgate FM, was launched on a 28-day restricted-service licence (RSL). The station broadcast during the run up to Christmas.

This station was organised by Brentwood community radio station Phoenix FM and was unrelated to future community radio projects in Basildon.

Since 2007 Eastgate has sponsored and hosted Gateway 97.8 (formally Gateway FM) which broadcasts from a shop studio unit in the Upper Galleries.

Gateway won a full-time community licence for the area to broadcast for five years from 25 September 2010 on 97.8FM, and provides media and broadcasting training for the community from its Eastgate home.

== Westgate development ==
The most recent development to the Town Centre was the Westgate development (officially known as the Westgate Park Shopping Centre) which was built during 1998–1999. Westgate is an open air development of 10 large units and with parking on multiple levels. This was built on the site of Basildon Council's former temporary residence, which they had moved out of in the 1990s into the newly constructed Basildon Centre, and the site of the original Towngate Theatre (formerly The Arts Centre closed 1988). It had originally been planned to be called the Fodderwick Shopping Park.

== Regeneration ==
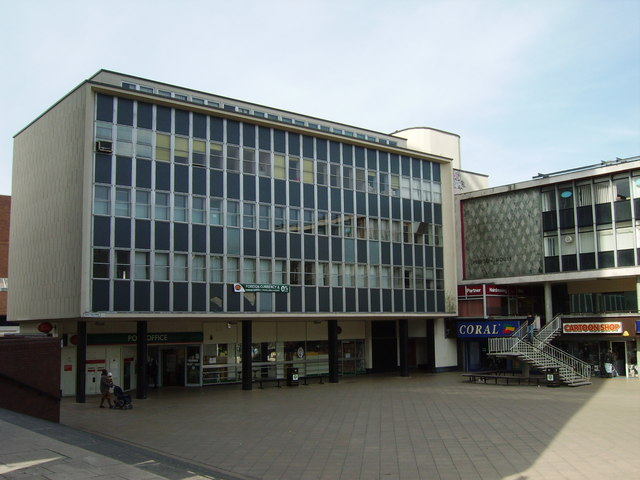
Freedom House (pictured) was one of several areas of Basildon Town Centre subject to regeneration proposals. It was demolished in 2019.

In the 1990s Basildon Council planned a regeneration of the Town Square and the former home of the council offices. Westgate, listed above, was developed onto the former council office site. In the town square, the 1960s town clock was removed, as was the escalators up to High Pavement (replaced initially by a temporary staircase, now a permanent structure containing stairs and lifts). Also removed was part of Keay House, what is now called Southgate House, which had jutted out into the Town Square. The town square was re-paved and the building of two retail pavilions, now operated by Toni & Guy and Costa, were completed in 1998.

The late 2000s downturn in the global economy negatively impacted on Basildon Town Centre and a 2013 survey found 31 empty retail units with retailers including KFC, McDonald's Pizza Hut, Adams and Peacocks leaving the Town Centre. As a result of a period characterized as a "rapid decline" by developers CZWG £1bn regeneration proposals were announced by Basildon Council in 2012. The proposals include the creation of a cinema, the creation of between 1,500 and 2,000 homes, a 150-room hotel and a college for up to 2,000 students. So far the only development given planning permission is the building of the new South Essex College campus on current site of Basildon market, which was due to open in 2015–16, but ended up opening in January 2021. Basildon Market was earmarked to move to St Martin's Square, with work starting in July 2016. However delays meant the market did not open until October 2018. The council have also purchase Freedom House and bits of East Walk as part of the regeneration plans for a new cinema, with work starting in 2019.

In 2013, SEEVIC announced that they would be opening New Campus Basildon Studio School, which would be temporarily housed in their facility in the ICON building but would transfer in September 2014 into Churchgate House. However this never materialized and the college, still based at Churchgate House, announced in January 2017 that they would be closing from September 2017.

There were attempts to sell Trafford House a building that was used by Ford Motor Company up until 2005 but which has been vacant for almost a decade. Developers were given planning permission in 2014 to turn the building into flats, which opened in 2015. Another vacant building, The Aviva Building, has been vacant since 2008 when the insurance company laid off staff. Proposals to turn this building into flats were rejected in 2013, and it has since been reduced in height by several stories rather than being demolished completely.

== Leisure ==
The town centre was formerly home to numerous leisure facilities but this has dwindled since the opening of Festival Leisure Park. In 1971, ABC opened a two screen cinema, but this closed in 1999 and has been converted into a unit for the British Heart Foundation and Flats. In 2018 work started by Demolishing Freedom House to make way for a multi screen Empire cinema. In 1962 its first bowling alley opened on Southernhay, but this was cut in half in 1975 when part of it was converted to a bingo hall, and in 1985 this was converted fully to a bingo hall and is now home to Gala Bingo. Since the 1990s Basildon Bowl has been located in Northgate House on High Pavement. From 1961 to 1998 a nightclub (last known as Racquels) was based on Market Pavement in Blenheim House (this was a Rileys snooker club until Dec 2014), while between 1971 and 1988 Sweeneys Discothèque was at High Pavement (now Palmers Solicitors). The only nightclub in the town centre is now Colors, a gay focused nightclub above the Beehive Pub. There is another pub in the Town Centre; The Edge (formerly The Highway and subsequently The New Yorker). The Edge hosts live and unsigned music nights, arranged by Hippy Joe Hymas of Hayseed Dixie. There had formerly been public houses on High Pavement and Fodderwick.

== Architectural significance ==
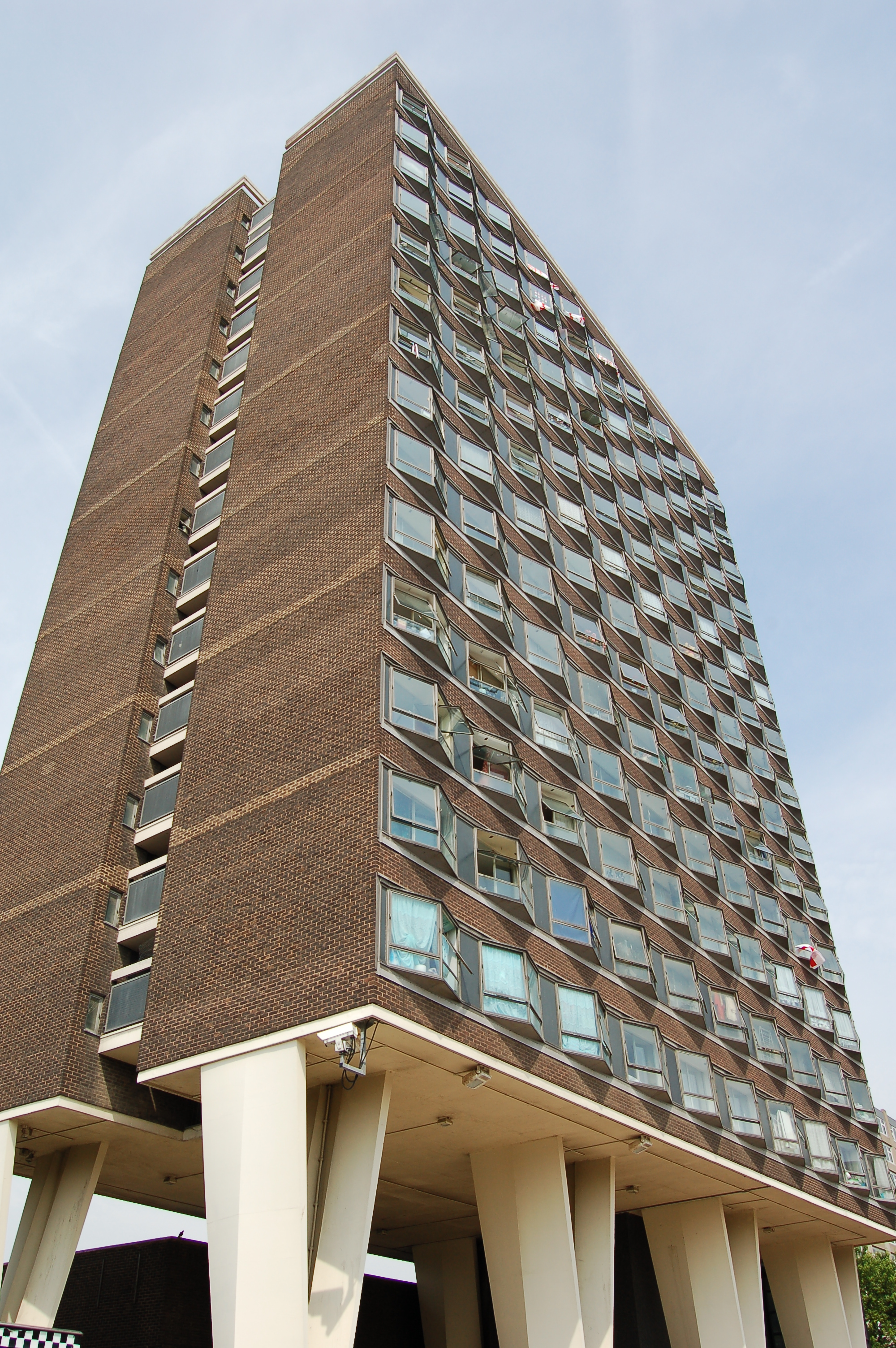
Brooke House, showing its v-shaped pylons

The largest structure in the new town's town centre is Brooke House, a 14-storey residential tower block that fronts the west side of the town centre's East Square. Dating from 1962, it was designed by Sir Basil Spence and Anthony B Davies, with Ove Arup and Partners as the structural engineers. It has a 1960s Brutalist design, elevated on 8 massive V-shaped concrete pylons. The building was chosen to have a residential function, as opposed to commercial office space, to retain life in the town centre after the shops had closed. Shops were positioned to the rear of the building, with Brooke House acting as a covered forecourt. It was conceived as a structure to define Basildon's urban status and to act as marker to identify the Town Centre's location within a largely low-rise settlement set in a flat landscape. It was named after the then Minister of Housing and Local Government, Henry Brooke.

East of Brooke House is East Square, a sunken open-air public plaza accessed from Brooke House by a monumental staircase and a curved ramp. The east side of the square was formerly fronted by Freedom House, containing shops on two levels, and the north side by the Post Office building, a 5-storey structure. Formerly on the wall of Freedom House is the oldest piece of public sculpture in the new town: installed in 1957, it is a wire and aluminium relief by the sculptor A. J. Poole titled "Man Aspires". The whole ensemble was designed to create a formal setting for Brooke House, and had a similar Brutalist design, though softened by other architectural features. Freedom House and the Post Office building were demolished in 2019 to make way for a new Cinema. The Town Centre extends from East Square towards the southwest. Down the middle of this zone runs a rectangular raised pool. Within the pool is a bronze sculpture and fountain, titled "Mother and Child", by the sculptor Maurice Lambert and dating from 1959.

Sections of Basildon Town Centre, including Brooke House and the raised pool, are Grade II listed.
