= John Frederic Dawson =

Rev. John Frederic Dawson LL.B. (1802 – 11 October 1870 Clapham, Bedfordshire) was an English entomologist and taxonomist from 'The Woodlands' near Bedford best known for his work on the Carabidae beetles "Geodephaga Britannica; a Monograph of the Carnivorous Ground-Beetles indigenous to the British Isles" (London, 1854). He became a member of the Entomological Society of London in 1852, and was mainly active in Dorset and the Isle of Wight. He obtained a Bachelor of Civil Law degree from Trinity College in July 1827.

He was the son of John Thomas Dawson, former mayor of Bedford, and Mary Higson Leach, who were married at Goldington church. John Frederic was twice married – his first wife Hester Wade-Gery (1804–1860), whom he married on 1 May 1827, producing a son, William Henry Dawson. After his first wife's death John Frederic married his housekeeper, Alice Procter, and fathered a son, John Frederic, who was baptised at Clapham in 1864. and a daughter, Ada Eliza Dawson, later the wife of Henry Fuller. In his will he left an annuity to his first son William, the estate of Woodlands to the second son, and amply provided for his widow, Alice, who was later recorded as living at 1 Vernon Terrace, Brighton, Sussex.

Woodland Manor Hotel In 1812 the present hotel site came up at auction as part of a 23 acre lot containing a cottage and carpenters lodge. The sales description predicted that it had "the capability of being made into a highly ornamental and picturesque residence". Attracted by the lands "extensive views and rich quality", as well as parish rates averaging 6d, John Thomas Dawson purchased the land and built the original mansion four years later. After his death in 1850 the house passed to his eldest son the Reverend John Dawson and it was the clergyman's own demise twenty years later which led to a macabre attempt to settle a dispute over inheritance. Reporting on the grisly occurrence, the local newspaper revealed "The carpenter who had screwed down the lid averred that previous to this being done the nurse who had attended the deceased in his last illness placed under his body a bundle of documents tied with red tape". It took all night to lift the gravestone while constables stood by to keep back sensation seekers. At last the coffin was broached to reveal the documents – love letters which had passed between the Reverend and his first wife and placed there at his dying request. Subsequently the property passed into the hands of the local Justice of the Peace, William Long Fitzpatrick, who may have been related to the Novel Irish Family that inherited Ampthill Park in 1736 and provided three Members of Parliament for Bedfordshire over the ensuing 80 years. It was William who commissioned the Manor we see today, built by the local architects Usher and Anthony. The date of the building-1901-and the Fitzpatrick family crest are displayed over the main entrance. After World War II the Manor was used as a guest house and as a hospital for the Ministry of Supply. Later it was used as a research establishment for a time before becoming a hotel in 1973.

— https://www.geni.com/projects/Historic-Buildings-of-Bedfordshire-England/25087

The London Standard of 27 September 1876, says: "Much excitement was caused yesterday morning in the village of Clapham, near Bedford, by the exhumation of the remains of Rev. John Frederic Dawson, LL.B., of Woodlands in that parish, who died in October, 1870, at the age of sixty-eight, and who was buried in the parish churchyard. It would appear that in 1812 the state of Woodlands...." John Frederic Dawson was buried in the churchyard of the Church of Saint Thomas à Becket in Clapham, Bedfordshire.

From the records it appears that Rev. Dawson kept a well-stocked wine cellar; in 1859 one of his staff, Charles Gascoin, was brought before the court accused of stealing 30 gallons of wine. He had helped stack more than 27 dozen bottles of port and sherry and over the course of some 15 months had pilfered from the cellar.
