= Northlands Park, Basildon =

Park in Basildon

Northlands Park
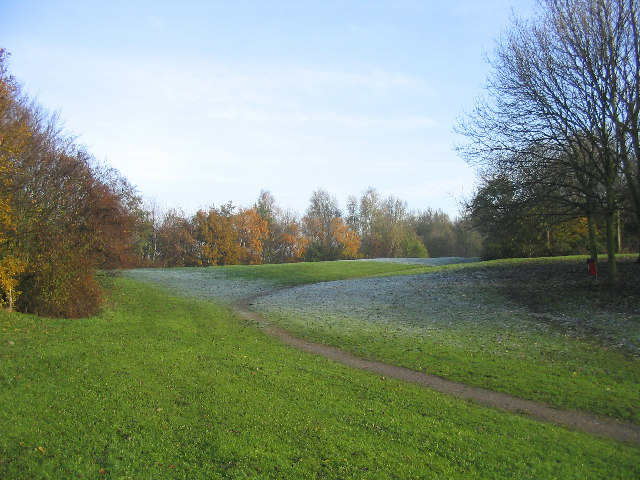
- Interactive map of Northlands Park
- Type: Urban Park
- Location: Basildon, Essex, England
- Coordinates: 51.5773°N 0.4975°E
- Operator: Basildon Council
- Open: All year

Northlands Park is a park in Basildon, Essex, England.

== History of the park ==
Basildon Northlands Park was created by Basildon Development Corporation (BDC) in the 1970s on the former Felmore Farm. During construction the land was landscaped with two lakes and hills. The lakes are three feet deep and cover an area of eight acres. They were made to catch floodwater from the nearby developments at Fryerns and Chalvedon. The Felmore Farm house became derelict and was demolished in the 1980s.

== Facilities ==
The facilities include a cafe, walking, picnicking, fishing lakes, flower gardens, a children's playground, a skatepark and a multi-use sports area. Basildon Parkrun takes place every Saturday morning at 9am, the course is three laps of the park taking in the lakes. The park covers an area of around seventy acres. Fishing is allowed with the two coarse lakes best known for bream, big carp and pike, while roach, tench, crucian carp, chub and eels are less common.
