= Gloucester Park, Gloucester =

Park in Gloucester, United Kingdom

Gloucester Park
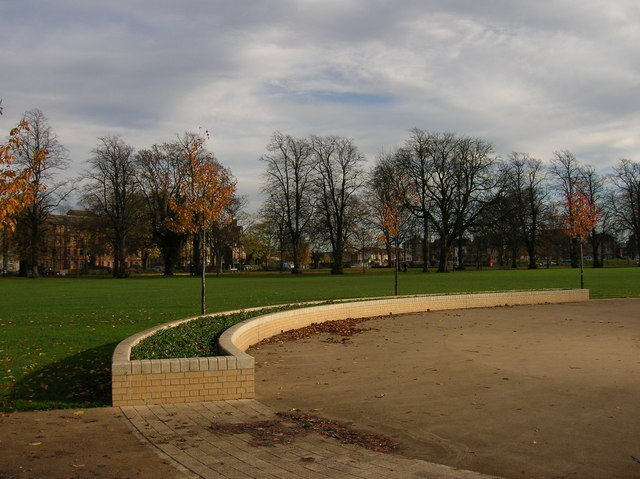
- Interactive map of Gloucester Park
- Type: Urban Park
- Location: Gloucester, Gloucestershire, England
- Coordinates: 51.8593°N 2.2471°W
- Created: 1848
- Open: All year

Gloucester Park is an urban park in Gloucester, Gloucestershire, England.

== History ==
The park began life as part of the "Spa Pleasure Grounds" created in 1815. By 1848 the land had been bought by the Gloucester Municipal Corporation and it was opened as a park, it was expanded to the current size in 1862.

== Landmarks ==
The park is located within a conservation area and contains a number of features that are listed with Historic England. There is a Grade II listed statue of Queen Anne.

== Facilities ==
There are sports facilities for Gloucester City Winget Cricket Club and Gloucester Spa Bowling Club, a table tennis table, skate park and multi-use sports pitch, a children's play area, a café, toilets, sealed footpaths and benches, a bandstand, flower beds, a memorial garden, a water feature and an aviary. Gloucester City parkrun takes place in the park every Saturday morning starting at 9am. There are a range of seasonal events including firework displays.
