= Pitsea =

Town in Essex, England

Coordinates: 51.569°N 0.504°E

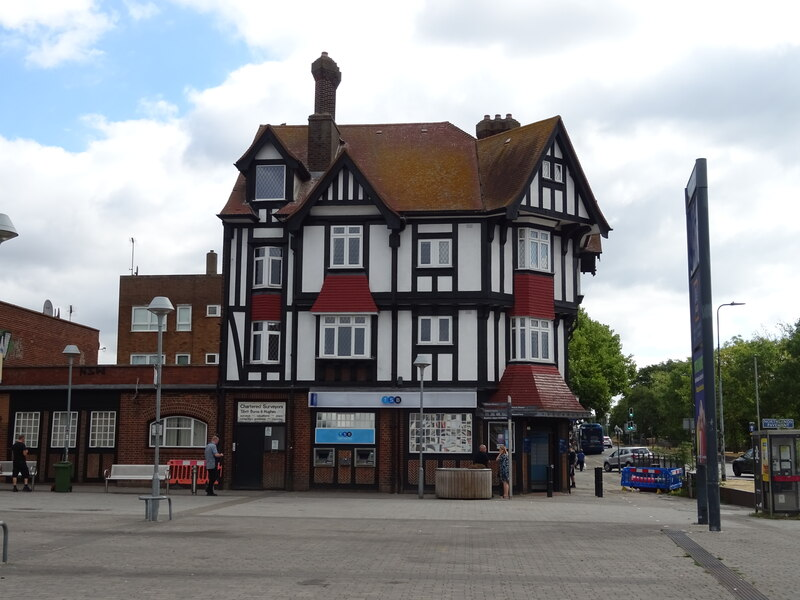
- Bank on The Broadway in the centre of Pitsea

- Location within Essex
- OS grid reference: TQ735885
- District: Basildon
- Shire county: Essex
- Region: East
- Country: England
- Sovereign state: United Kingdom
- Post town: BASILDON
- Postcode district: SS13
- Dialling code: 01268
- Police: Essex
- Fire: Essex
- Ambulance: East of England
- UK Parliament: South Basildon and East Thurrock

Pitsea is a suburban town forming the eastern part of Basildon in Essex, England. Historically a separate village and parish. Pitsea was a small village until the first half of the 20th century, when it experienced significant plotlands development. In 1949, it was included in the designated area of the new town of Basildon, which led to further residential and urban development. Pitsea subsequently became part of the built-up area of Basildon.

== History ==
The name Pitsea comes from ey, which in the Anglian dialect of Old English meant an island (in the sense of an area of dry land surrounded by marsh), coupled with the name of a person called Pic or Pit. The name therefore means Pic's island.

In the Domesday Book of 1086, Pitsea is listed as Piceseia in the Barstable Hundred of Essex. At that time it was owned by a woman called Wulfeva or Wulfgifu.

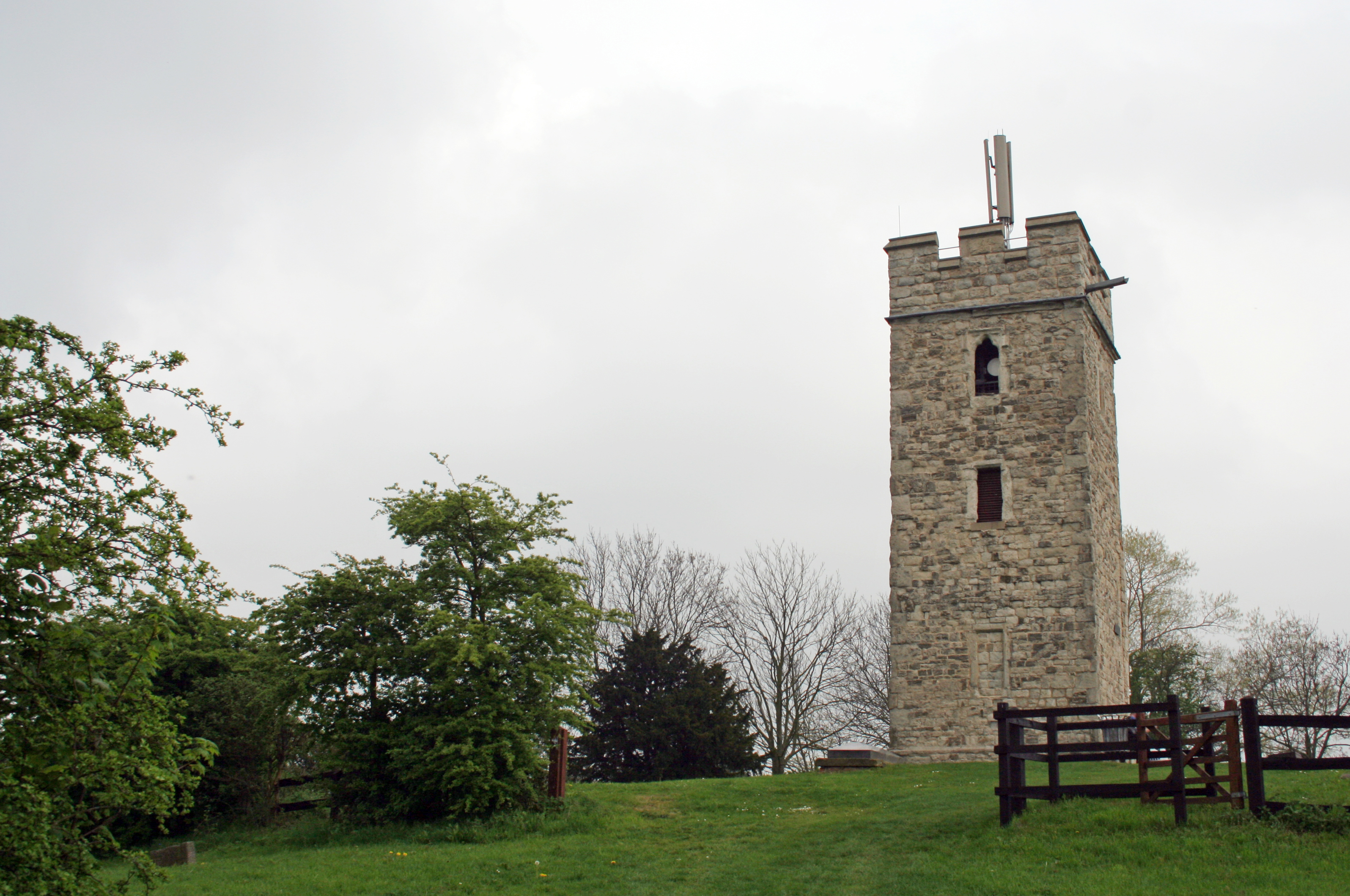
The 16th-century tower is all that remains of the former St Michael's Church

No church or priest is mentioned at Pitsea in the Domesday Book, but it subsequently became a parish. A church is known to have existed at Pitsea by the 12th century. The church, dedicated to St Michael, stood on a small hill called Pitsea Mount, which is likely the area of dry land referenced in Pitsea's name. The church was completely rebuilt in the early 16th century. It suffered with subsidence, and so the nave and chancel were rebuilt in 1871. The church was declared redundant in 1983 and fell into disrepair. The Victorian parts of the building were demolished in 1998, leaving just the 16th-century tower standing.

In the 1840s, Pitsea was described as a village at the head of a creek, with the parish having a population of 304. It had two manor houses: Pitsea Hall to the west of the village, and Chalvedon to the north. Pitsea Hall dates back to the 16th century and was once owned by the Cromwell family. The building has now been renamed Cromwell Manor and serves as an events venue. The manor house of Great Chalvedon Hall also dates back to the 16th century. It now serves as a public house.

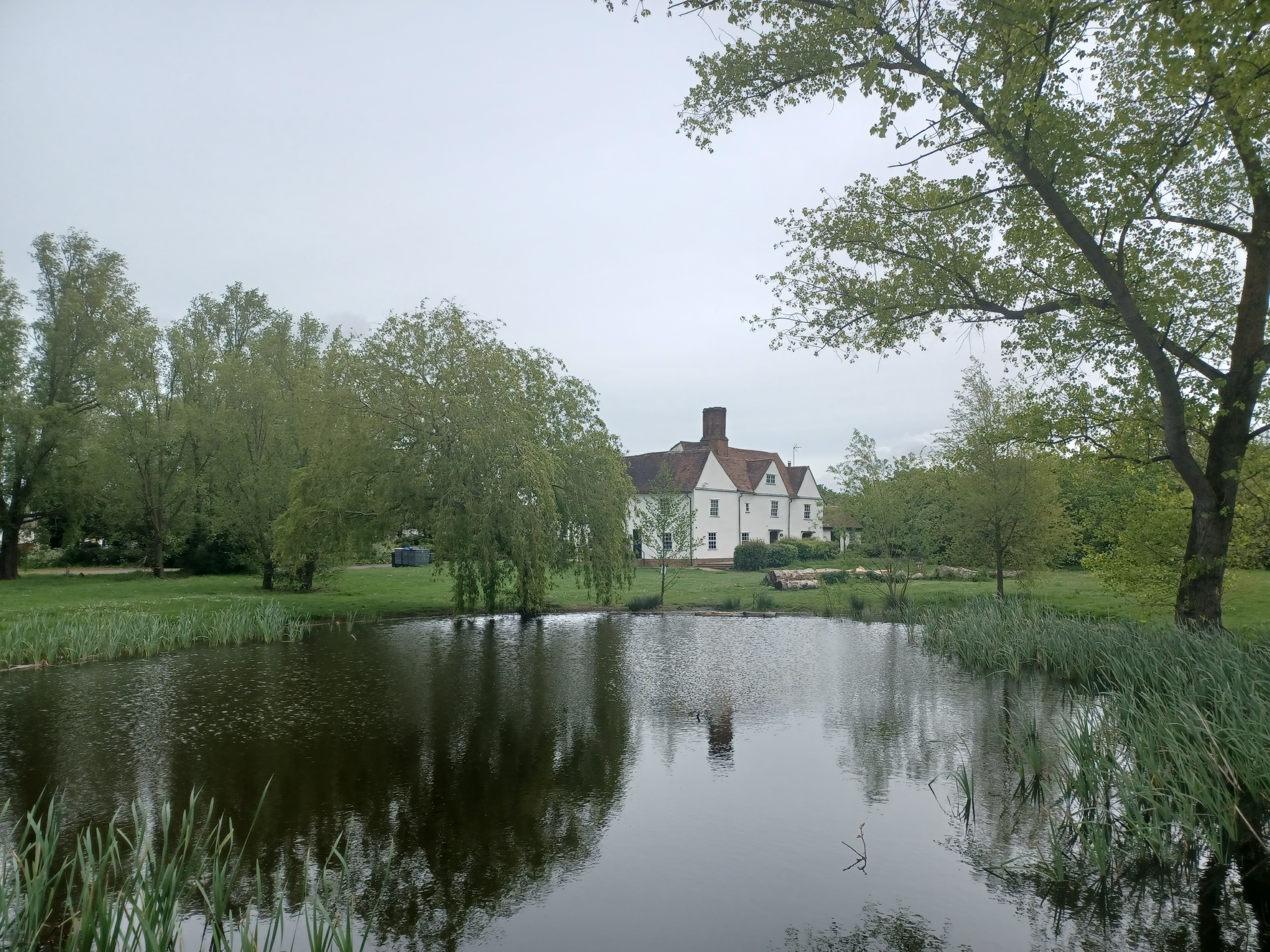
Great Chalvedon Hall

Pitsea railway station opened in 1855 on the London, Tilbury and Southend Railway. The original main line ran close to the Thames Estuary coast. In the 1880s the company built a shorter inland route, which left the old main line at Barking and rejoined it at Pitsea, which therefore became a junction station.

The area's heavy clay soil made for poor quality agricultural land. The late 19th century and early 20th century was a period of wider agricultural depression, and many farms in the area were sold for development as plotlands, especially in the 1920s and 1930s. People bought individual plots on which to build a house, but there was very little provision of infrastructure and many of the houses were of a poor quality.

Some facilities to serve Pitsea were built in the 1920s. A market started operating on Station Lane in 1925; it has since moved location a number of times. A number of other facilities were built at the instigation of Harold George Howard, a local landowner, farmer and businessman. He was responsible for the early development of much of Pitsea's nascent town centre on land to the north of the railway station in the late 1920s and early 1930s, including the Railway Hotel, a cinema, and parades of shops in a mock-Tudor style along The Broadway. The hotel and cinema have been demolished, but the shops remain. Howard was also responsible for laying out a park to the east of the town centre, where Pitsea's war memorial was erected in 1928. The park is now named Howard Park after him. By 1931, the parish of Pitsea had a population of 3,414.

The district and county councils were concerned by the poor quality of housing and infrastructure in the plotlands areas which had grown up around Pitsea and nearby Laindon. When the government was considering sites for new towns after the Second World War, the two councils petitioned for one such new town to be located around Pitsea and Laindon, partly as a way of securing funding to improve the area's infrastructure and housing. Basildon was formally designated as a new town in 1949, taking its name from a smaller village in between Laindon and Pitsea. There were about 8,700 existing homes in the designated area for the new town, of which 5,500 were deemed substandard.

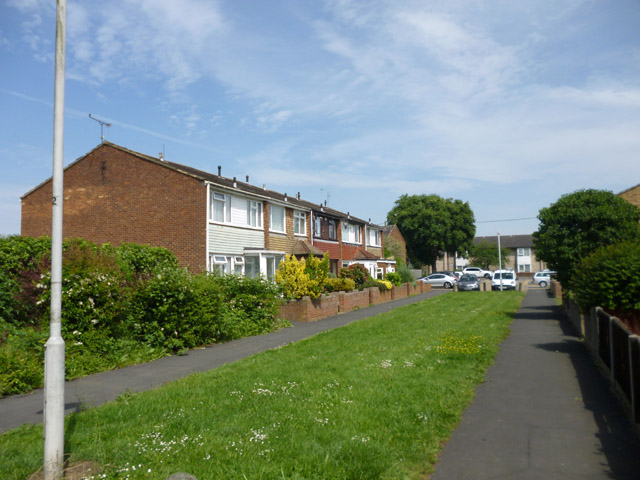
Somerset Gardens: 1960s houses built as part of the new town development

A masterplan for the new town was published in 1951, which involved redeveloping most of the plotlands and replacing them with modern neighbourhoods. The neighbourhoods at the Pitsea end of the new town included Chalvedon, Eversley, Felmores (sometimes now called Northlands Park Neighbourhood), Pitsea Mount and the industrial area of Burnt Mills.

The Cinema Museum in London holds extensive home movies from the Jefree family of Pitsea in the 1950s.

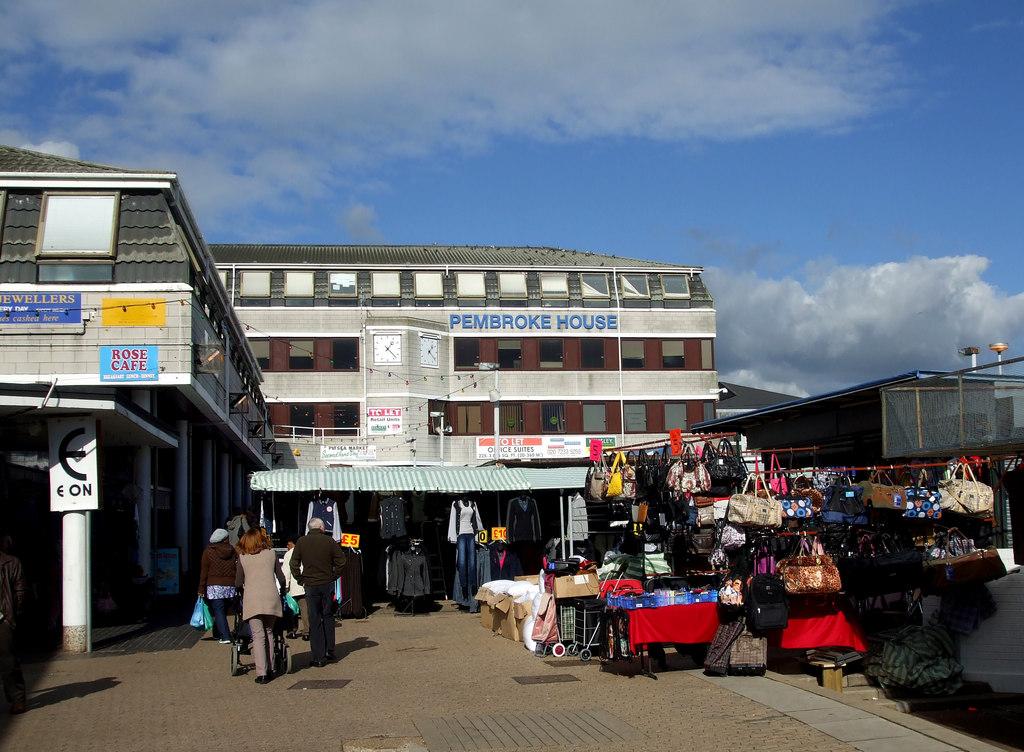
Pembroke House at Northlands Pavement

Further major development of Pitsea did not take place until the 1960s, when the new town redevelopment of Basildon took shape. Pitsea market was moved from its original location in Station Lane in 1969 to Howards Field, to make way for the construction of South Mayne. The A13 flyover, completed in 1973, separates Pitsea Mount and the railway station from the rest of Pitsea. In 1976, Pitsea's expanded town centre was opened along Northlands Pavement (previously Northlands Drive), immediately north of the 1920s town centre. Sainsbury's was the anchor store, along with a new office block called Pembroke House; it was quickly followed by the new Pitsea swimming pool (demolished 2013). In 1978, Tesco opened what was at the time the largest supermarket in Europe, and would eventually become the first Tesco Extra store in 1997. Also, in 1978, Pitsea Market moved for a second time; it relocated behind the Railway Hotel and in front of the Sainsbury's supermarket (the second market place became a car park).

In 1981, the Pitsea Centre opened - a leisure centre and library opposite the former pool. A new leisure centre at Eversley opened in 1987. 1995 saw the opening of the Old Market Retail park on the second market place; part of this was destroyed by fire in 2006, to be rebuilt again in 2007. Sainsbury's supermarket moved outwards to Nethermayne, on the former sports ground of Carrera's cigarette factory.

== Governance ==
There are two tiers of local government covering Pitsea, at district and county level: Basildon Borough Council and Essex County Council. Two of the wards of the borough of Basildon are named after Pitsea: Pitsea North West and Pitsea South East (the latter also includes Bowers Gifford and North Benfleet). At the 2021 census these two wards had a combined population of 25,161.

In terms of parliamentary representation, Pitsea forms part of the South Basildon and East Thurrock constituency. The MP has been James McMurdock of Reform UK since the 2024 general election.

=== Administrative history ===
Pitsea was an ancient parish in the Barstable Hundred of Essex. When elected parish and district councils were established in 1894, Pitsea was included in the Billericay Rural District. Most of the rural district, including Pitsea, was converted into the Billericay Urban District in 1934, which also covered Billericay, Wickford, Laindon, and surrounding rural areas. The civil parishes within the urban district were united into a single parish called Billericay in 1937.

Following the designation of the new town in 1949, it was decided in 1955 to rename the urban district from Billericay to Basildon. In 1974 the urban district was replaced by a non-metropolitan district called Basildon. The Basildon district was subsequently awarded borough status in 2010, allowing the chair of the council to take the title of mayor.

== Regeneration ==
The regeneration of Pitsea town centre started in 2010. The Station Lane redevelopment was completed in 2012 and is a prominent landmark that can be seen on approach to Pitsea. A large L-shaped building, it comprises five ground-floor retail units, 121 flats (a mixture of social and private housing), and resident parking for 126 cars and 109 bikes; it forms a new linkway between Pitsea Broadway and Tesco.

In May 2013, The Railway Hotel public house was demolished, as the Fortune of War pub had been. The Pitsea swimming pool was pulled down in January 2013. A new market square has been put onto the site of the former Railway Hotel, officially opening in 2014. The former Co-op store (closed early 1980s) that had hosted an arcade and several independent business was demolished in early 2014 and, by July 2014, a new Aldi was built on this site and part of the former market place. The rest of the former market place has been converted into parking.

The former Sainsbury's building that had hosted Aldi and Castaways, a fish restaurant, were knocked down and replaced by a 70,000 sq ft store which was to be occupied by Morrisons in Spring 2015. However, due to the downturn in the supermarket business Morrisons pulled out of the deal, and The Range chain opened their new store in the building in July 2016.

== Sport ==
Pitsea is the home of semi-professional football club Bowers & Pitsea. They play at the Len Salmon Stadium, known locally as Crown Avenue. Bowers & Pitsea also have many youth teams playing in the local area.

Other sporting clubs in Pitsea include Eversley Park Cricket Club, Basildon & Pitsea Cricket Club, Chalvedon Football Club, Chalvedon Boys Football Club, Chalvedon Boys Amateur Boxing Club and Pitsea Running Club. There are numerous Sunday League junior and men's football teams; most of these teams can be found playing locally on a Sunday at locations across Pitsea, including Eversley Recreation Ground and Pitsea School.

Northlands Park is a large open space in Pitsea and is home to two large fishing lakes regularly used by anglers. The lake holds bream, carp, eel, perch, pike, roach, rudd and tench.

== Education ==
- Basildon Academies
- Northlands Infant & Junior School
- Briscoe Infant & Junior School
- Eversley County Primary School
- Felmore Infant & Junior School
- St Margaret's Church of England School
- Pitsea Infant & Junior School
- Northlands Park Children's Centre.

The Basildon Information and Technology Education Centre (ITEC) was formerly located in Burnt Mills Road. The centre provided both day and night courses in computer IT and design and technology for both school leavers and adults. It was once an infant and junior school for the local area called Nevendon Infant and Junior School, but due to other schools opening in the area, pupil numbers declined and the school eventually closed.

Essex County Council's Adult Community Learning service operated a satellite centre at Briscoe School in Felmores End until 2016, in addition to the main centre located at Ely House at Churchill Way in Fryerns.

== Transport ==
The town is served by Pitsea railway station on the London, Tilbury and Southend line. c2c operates regular services between London Fenchurch Street, Southend Central and Shoeburyness.

Local bus services are routes 1, 5, 8, 12, 21, 22 and 28 that operate from Pitsea Broadway to the nearby towns of Basildon, Canvey and Southend by First Essex, Arriva Southend and Stephensons.

The following roads serve the town or pass nearby:

- The A13, which connects London and Southend, cuts through the town and provides a direct link to the M25.
- To the north is the A127, which also links London and Southend.
- To the east is the A130, which connects Canvey Island and Chelmsford.
- To the west is the A132, which separates Pitsea from Barstable and Vange; this road links to Basildon town centre, the A127 and Wickford.

== Employment ==
Most people living in Pitsea commute to either Basildon, Southend or London for employment.

Pitsea has many office spaces, which can be found in Pembroke House in the main Pitsea Centre, Broadway Chambers on the main Pitsea Broadway and Tudor Chambers on Station Lane. The offices include solicitors, insurance companies, an accounting software company and an employment agency.

To the north of Pitsea is the Burnt Mills Industrial Estate, which has many industrial units including freight delivery, printing, a car wreck yard and a small amount of manufacturing, including Gardner Aerospace. Also in this area is the main delivery depot for the courier T.N.T. The area also has the main sewage treatment works which during the summer has reportedly been the cause of a nasty smell, although Essex and Suffolk Water deny that it is at fault. Further along is the main local depot for the cable TV company Telewest Blueyonder, which came to the area in the early 1990s under the name of United Artists before changing its name to Telewest and then more recently to Virgin Media. This had previously been the main customer service centre for United Artists.

== Local issues ==
In the land between the sewage treatment works and the Hovefields Industrial Park is a large incinerator. This created some local disapproval in its planning, with petitions having been signed and handed to the Government; the main concerns were fumes from the chimneys on the incinerator and what effect they could have on local people's health. However, after agreement between Essex County Council, Balfour Beatty and Urbaser, building work started in 2013 and the plant opened in 2015.

Pitsea Tip has been in operation throughout the 20th century on the Pitsea Marshes. It has been reputedly the source of a nasty smell which affects both Pitsea and Canvey Island, although scientific evidence completed on behalf of the landfill operator Veolia proved inconclusive.

In 2013, it was announced that developers wanted to build a new village on land in between Pitsea and Bowers Gifford. The development was being put forward by Meridian Strategic Land but was plainly rejected in September 2013, as it did not fall within the town plan. Meridian raised an appeal to the Government Inspector and an outcome was due late 2014.

== Notable people ==
- Michael Kightly footballer with Southend United F.C., Wolverhampton Wanderers F.C., Stoke City F.C. and Burnley F.C.
- QBoy, UK's leading gay rapper
- Scott Robinson, singer with 5ive
- James Tomkins footballer with West Ham United F.C. and Crystal Palace F.C.
