= Gloucester Park, Basildon =

Park in Basildon, Essex, England

Coordinates: 51.574°N 0.4506°E

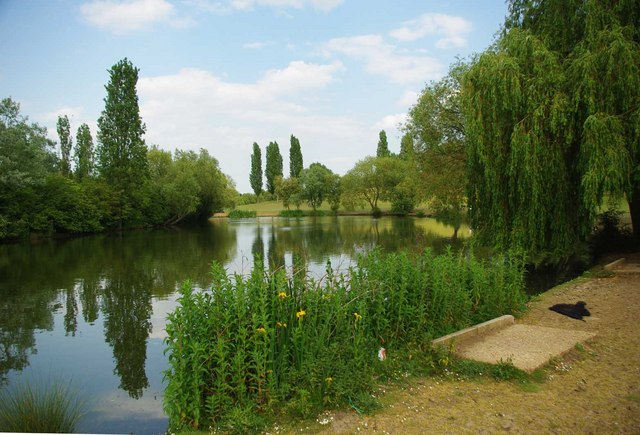
Fishing lake in the park

Gloucester Park in Basildon is an urban neighbourhood park, named after the Duke of Gloucester who opened the park in 1957.

In the 1970s, a 6-acre (24,000 m^{2}) artificial fishing lake was made in the park, and it has held the annual Basildon Festival since 2001, which was moved from Wat Tyler Park. The park previously featured an indoor swimming pool, which was later demolished in 2011.

Basildon Sporting Village opened on the northern edge of the Park in April 2011, initially serving as a training camp for the Olympic Games in London 2012. Its facilities include a swimming pool, athletics stadium, gymnastics hall, badminton courts, a climbing wall, fitness suite and outdoor football pitches. It is also the training facility of Basildon Athletics Club

The park is frequently used for cross-country events throughout the year.
