= Lansdown, Cheltenham =

Lansdown
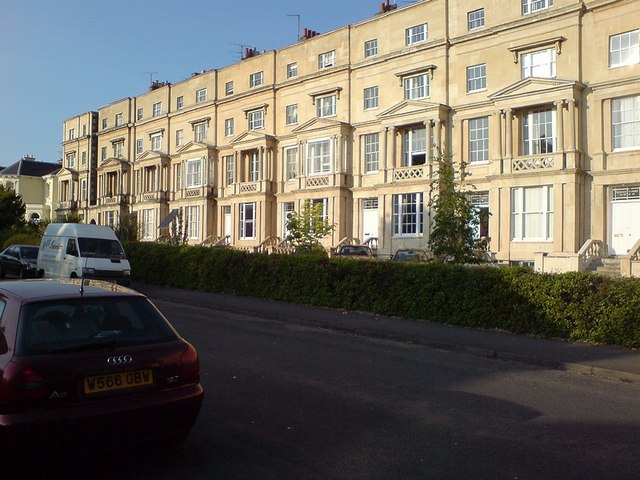
- Lansdown Terrace in Malvern Road, Cheltenham (April 2007)

- Location within Gloucestershire
- Population: 5,923 (2011.Ward)
- District: Cheltenham
- Shire county: Gloucestershire
- Region: South West
- Country: England
- Sovereign state: United Kingdom
- Post town: CHELTENHAM
- Postcode district: GL50
- Police: Gloucestershire
- Fire: Gloucestershire
- Ambulance: South Western

Lansdown is a district of the Regency town Cheltenham Spa in Gloucestershire, England. Situated in a conservation area, much of the architecture is listed, including the distinctive Lansdown Estate.

== Origins ==
Like Montpellier, and much of Regency Cheltenham, this was the work of two family groups: the Thompsons and later the Jearrads.

The first of these was financier and property developer Henry Thompson (d. 1824), then later his son Pearson Thompson (1794-1872). Henry purchased the Reverend de la Bere of Southam's estate in 1801 and by 1804 had constructed his own residence of Hygeia House (Note: 51.8957°N 2.0761°W) (Note: Today the Grade II listed Vittoria House.) The increasing fashion for 'taking the waters' encouraged him to develop Montpellier Spa, opening a wooden pavilion with landscaped gardens and promenades in 1809. In 1817 the pavilion was rebuilt in stone as the Pump Room.

Henry's next development was the residential Lansdown Estate, cut short by his death in 1824. After this, his son Pearson continued to develop the site. He engaged J.B. Papworth, a founder of the Royal Institute of British Architects (RIBA), as architect for an elegant estate comprising villas and terraces as both high- and middle-price houses. In 1825, Pearson also had Papworth rebuild the Montpellier Pump Room with a domed rotunda that still stands today.

By 1830 though, Pearson Thompson was in financial difficulties and engaged the architect brothers Robert William and Charles Jearrad as co-developers. They were responsible for adding Lansdown Crescent, an immense crescent in the Georgian Classical style of town planning, to Papworth's designs. They also designed the large 2,000 seat Christ Church, built from 1837 and consecrated in 1840, to attract residents of the right quality to their new development.

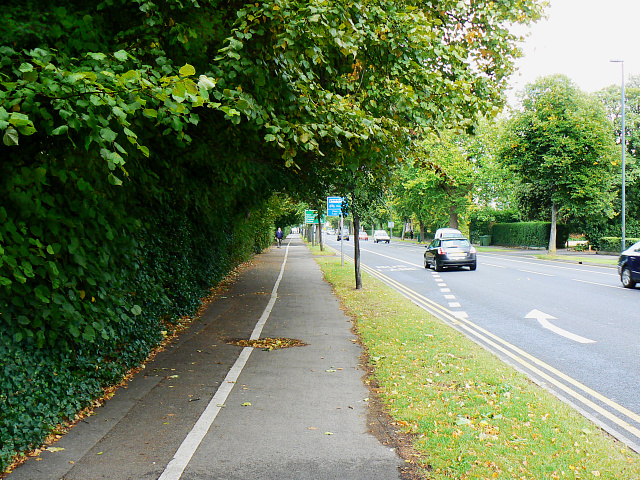
Lansdown Road Cheltenham with a Bicycle Path.
