= John Papworth (disambiguation) =

John Papworth (1921–2020) is an English clergyman, writer and activist.

John Papworth is also the name of:

- John Papworth (plasterer) (1750–1799), English plasterer and stuccoist
- John Buonarotti Papworth (1775–1847), English architect and artist
- John Woody Papworth (1820–1870), English architect, designer and antiquary
