= Hygeia House =

Hygeia House can refer to:

- Hygeia House (Cheltenham), 1801, one of the first important houses to be built in the Georgian and Regency expansion of Cheltenham
- Hygeia House (Rhode Island), 1885
- Hygeia Hotel at Fort Monroe in Hampton, Virginia, 1882
- Hygeia (city), a proposed utopian city of 1827, on the same principles.
