= Cheltenham Looker-On =

Discontinued English periodical

The Cheltenham Looker-On was a social and literary weekly periodical published in Cheltenham, England, between 1833 and 1920.

The Looker-On was founded in 1833 by Henry Davies, then the librarian and bookseller of Montpellier Spa, with its first issue in May 1833. Davies had established his own newspaper in preference to taking a post offered with the Gloucester Chronicle. Initially, the Looker-On was a literary periodical professing itself to be "A Note Book of the Sayings and Doings of Cheltenham". It quickly established a reputation as a weekly fashionable and literary paper, the Gentleman's Magazine in 1837 crediting the editor "whose talents as an essayist and editor have been honourably displayed". The periodical's news and social gossip was widely quoted. For example, its report regarding the nursing of Queen Victoria's daughter was quoted in 1841 as far away as New Zealand as was a report in 1847 of the Turkish Minister's wife arriving at Court in Court Dress rather than veiled.

The Looker-On mixed social news and literary contributions and followed its editor's opinions being very partisan in the Conservative cause. Following the death of its founder and editor for 57 years in 1890, it was taken over by his son Edward Llewellyn Davies until his death in 1898. The Looker-on became more a journal of news and fashion, and remained in publication until 1920. The Looker-On's Printing Works were also employed for local publications.

The Cheltenham Looker-On has been widely referenced in local studies publications, biographies, music and miscellaneous articles.

Historical copies of the Cheltenham Looker-On, dating back to 1833, are available to search and view in digitised form at The British Newspaper Archive. The Cheltenham Local Studies Centre at Cheltenham Public Library holds physical copies of the periodical. There is also a set at the British Museum.
