= Cheltenham Festival (disambiguation) =

Cheltenham Festival may refer to:

- The Cheltenham Festival, a British horse racing event held in March
- Cheltenham Cricket Festival, an event centered around Gloucestershire County Cricket Club matches
- The Cheltenham Festivals, a series of music, literature and science events:
  - Cheltenham Jazz Festival
  - Cheltenham Science Festival
  - Cheltenham Music Festival
  - Cheltenham Literature Festival
- Other festivals held at Cheltenham, including:
  - Cheltenham Food & Drink Festival
  - Greenbelt Festival
  - Wychwood Festival
