= William Woof =

English cricketer

Personal information
- Full name: William Albert Woof
- Born: 9 July 1858; Gloucester, England
- Died: 4 April 1937 (aged 78); Montpellier, Cheltenham, England
- Batting: Right-handed
- Bowling: Left-arm slow; Left-arm fast

Domestic team information
- Years: Team
- 1878–1902: Gloucestershire
- 1882–1885: MCC
- FC debut: 20 June 1878 Gloucestershire v Surrey
- Last FC: 18 August 1902 Gloucestershire v Australians

Career statistics
Competition	First-class
Matches	160
Runs scored	1,274
Batting average	6.53
100s/50s	0/0
Top score	43
Balls bowled	35,541
Wickets	754
Bowling average	17.73
5 wickets in innings	69
10 wickets in match	11
Best bowling	8/70
Catches/stumpings	119/–
- Source: CricketArchive, February 2012

William Albert Woof (9 July 1858 – 4 April 1937) was an English cricketer who played for Gloucestershire from 1878 to 1902 and for Marylebone Cricket Club (MCC) between 1882 and 1885.

Woof was born in Gloucester and was educated at Bedford School. He apprenticed as an engineer at Grantham, Lincolnshire. He played for the Gloucestershire colts in 1878 and among the five wickets he took was that of W G Grace. He was a professional cricketer at Stubbington House, Fareham, Hampshire in May 1878 and made his first-class debut for Gloucestershire in August 1878 against Surrey. Later in 1878 he was professional at Grantham cricket club and in 1879 was with Lancashire. W G Grace got him a post as professional at Cheltenham College from 1880 to 1881 and in 1882 recommended him for the ground staff at Lord's. Woof played twelve matches for MCC between 1882 and 1885 and coached Cambridge from 1883 to 1884 and Oxford in 1885. His best seasons were 1884 when he took 116 wickets and 1885 when he took 100 wickets. He was able to give less time to the county while he was cricket coach at Cheltenham College from 1886. He played 140 matches for Gloucestershire taking 644 wickets for them until 1902. He also played first-class matches for the United South of England XI, the South and Orleans Club. He was also a first-class umpire from with one match in 1880 and most between 1895 and 1899. In the winter of 1903 and 1904 he umpired matches in South Africa.

Woof was a left arm bowler and took 754 wickets at an average of 17.73 and a best performance of 8 for 70. He was a right-handed batsman and played 258 innings in 160 first-class matches with an average of 6.53 and a top score of 43.

Woof continued as coach at Cheltenham College until 1925. He was also managing director of W.A.Woof Ltd, which ran sports outfitting shops in Cheltenham.

Woof died in Montpellier, Cheltenham at the age of 78 and was buried at Cheltenham College Chapel.
