= Henry Davies (journalist) =

Wales-born English journalist, publisher and librarian (1804–1890)

Henry Davies (2 March 1804 – 4 March 1890) was a Wales-born journalist, publisher and librarian at Cheltenham, England, who took an active part in the town's political life, and edited the Cheltenham Looker-On for 57 years.

== Early life ==
Davies was the son of John and Ann Davies and was born at Bridgend, Glamorgan. Little is known of his childhood, but he had a good literary education, while at the same time becoming steeped in the traditions of Wales and the Welsh language. At the age of 18 in 1822 he wrote patriotic Welsh poetry that was read at the Brecon Eisteddfod. In his early twenties, he spent a few years in London, establishing friendships at the London Institution, and began his literary career by contributing both prose and verse to the Literary Souvenir and other publications edited by Alaric Watts. He was living at Throgmorton Street in 1826 when he wrote another "spirited poetic address" for the opening of the Brecon Eisteddfod that year. He was librarian of the Metropolitan Cambrian Society or Cymmrodorion Society in 1828 while John Parry was Registrar of Music. In 1829 he won a prize from the Metropolitan Cambrian Society for an essay in Welsh on "Settlement of the Normans in Wales". He was appointed editor of the new Cambrian Quarterly Magazine but was asked to resigh before the first issue was published. Pearson Thompson invited him to Cheltenham in 1830, to undertake duties at the new Montpellier Rotunda, where he opened the Montpellier Library, a subscription library. He appeared at the Beaumaris Eisteddfod in the same year. In 1832 he read a poem at the Royal Eisteddfod at Beaumaris attended by Princess Victoria.

== Journalism and arts ==
In 1833, Davies declined the editorship of the Gloucester Chronicle, which was then about to be started, and originated his own weekly newspaper and social register, the Cheltenham Looker-On, publishing the first issue in May 1833. Initially, the Looker-On was a literary periodical rather than a journal of fashion and was what it professed to be "A Note Book of the Sayings and Doings of Cheltenham". He remained editor for 57 years until his death in 1890, when his son Edward Llewellyn Davies took over publication. As well as editor it is likely that he was a major contributor to the periodical's literary output. All this time he ran a circulating library and bookshop from Montpellier.

From 1837 he produced each year the Cheltenham Annuaire, a local directory and diary. The Gentleman's Magazine, reviewing this wrote:

This is a work elevated above the class to which it would otherwise belong, by the ability and good taste manifested in its accessories… The first [of a series of essays] is by the editor Mr H Davies whose talents both as an editor and as an essayist have been honourably displayed.

He also produced a number of local guides.

Davies was very fond of music and in 1835 he started the St David's Day concerts in the town and was associated with them for the rest of his life. For this, in 1870 he received a testimonial and a volume of subscribers which included many Welsh enthusiasts including Lady Llanover, Lady Charlotte Schreiber, Dowager Countess of Dunraven (Caroline, widow of the 2nd Earl of Dunraven), Sir Thomas Phillipps and Michael Hicks Beach MP. He inspired his children to perform and his daughter Mary sang and played the Welsh harp so beautifully, she was nicknamed "y Deryn" (the bird). He played a part in the founding of Cheltenham College in 1842, and was very actively involved in the Literary and Philosophic Institution at Cheltenham. He was the moving spirit behind the only visit of the British Association to Cheltenham which took place in 1856, and he acted as one of the honorary secretaries. He was however an implacable opponent of the establishment of a public library in the town. In 1858 he took the chair at the Llangolen Eisteddfod, regretting that he had lost his fluency in his native Welsh.

== Political activity ==
Davies was very active in the political life of Cheltenham as an "uncompromising Conservative". All his life he took a warm and deep interest in the welfare of Cheltenham and became involved in the running of the town from around 1833. He was one of the improvement commissioners nominated in the Cheltenham Improvement Act 1852 (15 & 16 Vict. c. l), and subsequently was chairman of that body. He remained until the town obtained a charter of incorporation in 1876. He was the only member of the board of commissioners who held his seat from first to last, "not indeed undisputed, but undisturbed". The strong individuality which marked his career "in the days of his health and vigour" was considered of great service to the town in many respects

He provided effective support to the Conservative Party in the town and county both directly and through the organ of his periodical. In the 1847 election, Sir Willoughby Jones was returned as Conservative MP for Cheltenham, after several years of Liberal dominance. The Cheltenham Examiner, which represented the Liberal Party wrote that Davies

was aided towards the prominent part he took in discussions by oratorical powers of no mean order, and by a courage in the expression of his views which enabled him to face the tumultuous and hostile demonstrations inseparable from political contest.

In 1865 Davies' political efforts helped secure the election of Charles Schreiber as Conservative MP. His political services to the Conservative party were recognised when he was presented with a Testimonial in 1877 by James Agg-Gardner, MP who was returned as a Conservative three times

By the end of 1889 Davies' strength began to fail. Working on his newspaper he may be said literally to have died in harness. His last expedition out of doors was to visit the parish church to inspect the windows presented by his friend, Mr W. H. Gwinnett and the town to the church, on which occasion the Cheltenham Chronicle recorded that he called at their office, and exchanged friendly greetings from his bath chair. The last letter which he wrote was addressed to the mayor offering to the public library one of the volumes which had become his property after being donated to the Philosophic Institution during its existence. There is a memorial window in the North transept of the parish church and in this, his children dedicated a pane representing St John to his memory.

A long innings, and not ill played withal, and if some strokes fell short, and others were misjudged, the score at the close is one of which "his field" – a town he loved – will speak with some just pride and satisfaction.

== Publications ==
His publications included various guides to Cheltenham and catalogues of picture collections

- Stories of Chivalry and Romance, 1827 (attributed by Cheltenham Public Library)
- The Stranger's Guide through Cheltenham (1832), (1834) (1842) (1843)
- Catalogue of the Montpellier Library, 1843
- Catalogue of Cheltenham College Library. 1843
- Picture galleries of Thirlestone House, Cheltenham, being notices of some of the principal paintings in Lord Northwick's collection (and variations) 1843, 1846, 1853
- The Cheltenham Looker-On, 1833–1890
- Cheltenham Annuaire, 1837–
