= Pearson Thompson =

Pearson Thompson (14 April 1794 – 22 November 1872) was an English solicitor and property developer who was responsible for the layout of a great part of Cheltenham, and of the Ladbroke Estate in London. He subsequently emigrated to Australia where he practiced law.

Thompson was the son of Henry Thompson and Judith, née Teshmaker. His father was a wealthy London merchant and underwriter who had bought a large piece of farmland near Cheltenham in 1801. Shortly after this, medicinal springs were discovered there and his father had developed the Montpellier Spa on the site. The first pump room was built in 1809. In early life Thompson practised as a solicitor in London, but after inheriting his father's property in 1820 moved to Cheltenham to develop the estate.

Thompson employed J. B. Papworth as his architect from 1824 onwards for both the layout of the Montpellier estate and the design of the Montepellier Pump Room, which included a domed circular room that became known as the Rotunda. In addition to creating the infrastructure, Thompson sought talent to support the spa's activities, for example Henry Davies, whom he bought from London to run a library and produce periodicals. Thompson owned the wealthy Lansdown district of Cheltenham, where Papworth also designed a number of large houses, including one for Richard Roy, a fellow developer. Both Thompson and Roy were members of a committee formed to provide fashionable public entertainments such as musical promenades and summer balls. In 1836 they were working together to consider the various proposals for railway lines to Cheltenham and founded a local joint-stock bank. Thompson also worked with the architects and developers R. W. and C. Jearrad, who took over the running of Montpellier Spa and designed Christ Church on land donated by Thompson.

Thompson and Roy developed an estate in Brighton, and in 1841 and 1842 they lent money to John Duncan, who was developing the Ladbroke Estate. When Duncan went bankrupt the creditors put them both in charge of carrying out the development. The layout and general character of parts of the Ladbroke estate owe much to the Montpellier estate at Cheltenham. Thompson remained in Cheltenham at his home Hatherley Court, his principal role being to provide the capital. He was at this time Justice of the Peace for the County of Gloucestershire.

Thompson's investment in the Ladbroke estate had "so involved his affairs as to compromise the whole of his property", and in 1849 he emigrated to Australia. He practiced at the bar in Sydney for a while, and then went to Castlemaine, Victoria, which was the centre of a large goldmining district. He was very successful and became a magistrate. He died there in 1872. At the time of his death he was described as the "Maker of Cheltenham". He had married Dorothy Scott, daughter of William Scott of Austin Friars, at Edmonton in 1817 and had four children.
