= Grade I listed buildings in Cheltenham =

Gloucestershire shown in England

There are over 9,000 Grade I listed buildings in England. This page is a list of these buildings in the district of Cheltenham in Gloucestershire.

== Cheltenham ==
Name	Location	Type	Completed (Note: The date given is the date used by Historic England as significant for the initial building or that of an important part in the structure's description.)	Date designated	Grid ref. (Note: Sometimes known as OSGB36, the grid reference is based on the British national grid reference system used by the Ordnance Survey.) Geo-coordinates	Entry number (Note: The "List Entry Number" is a unique number assigned to each listed building and scheduled monument by Historic England.)	Image
Church of All Saints	Cheltenham	Church	1865-1868	12 March 1955	SO9570322631; 51°54′08″N 2°03′50″W	1386679	Church of All Saints More images
Cheltenham Minster	Cheltenham	Church	Late 12th century	5 May 1972	SO9483222540; 51°54′05″N 2°04′35″W	1386792	Cheltenham Minster More images
Montpellier Rotunda (Lloyds Bank) and Pump Room	Cheltenham	Colonnade	1817	12 March 1955	SO9440521840; 51°53′42″N 2°04′58″W	1387363	Montpellier Rotunda (Lloyds Bank) and Pump Room More images
Pittville Pump Room	Cheltenham	Pump Room	1825-1830	12 March 1955	SO9546323726; 51°54′43″N 2°04′03″W	1387559	Pittville Pump Room More images
Thirlestaine House with Attached Railings and 2 Lamp Posts	Cheltenham	House	1823	12 March 1955	SO9479721348; 51°53′26″N 2°04′37″W	1386724	Thirlestaine House with Attached Railings and 2 Lamp Posts More images
