= Hygeia (city) =

Proposed utopian community

Coordinates: 39.095°N 84.552°W

Hygeia was a proposed utopian community on the bank of the Ohio River on the site of present-day Ludlow, Kentucky.

The land was granted to Gen. Thomas Sandford by the U.S. military in 1790. Sandford traded the land to Thomas D. Carneal, who had Elmwood Hall built in 1818 on the riverfront, then sold the land to William Bullock, a British showman, entrepreneur and traveller, owner of the Egyptian Hall in Piccadilly, London. Bullock proposed a planned community named Hygeia (a Greek word meaning health) designed in Egyptian style by John Buonarotti Papworth.

The speculation was not a success, although some people, including Frances Milton Trollope, took part; Bullock sold the land to Israel L. Ludlow in 1846.

== See also ==
- Hygeia House, a number of contemporary houses inspired by the same principle
