= Montpellier, Cheltenham =

Area in Cheltenham, Gloucestershire, England

Coordinates: 51°53′44″N 2°4′57″W

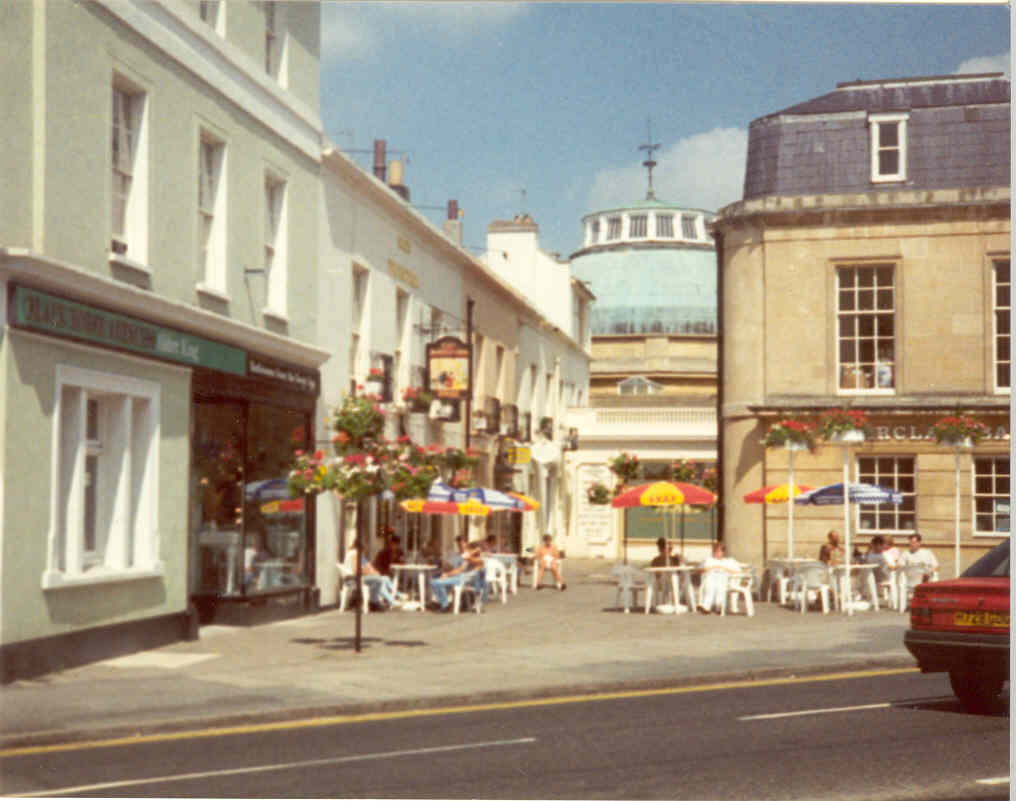
Montpellier Rotunda area

Montpellier is a district of the Regency town Cheltenham Spa in Gloucestershire, England. Montpellier is one of the most historic areas of the Cheltenham, based at the end of the Promenade and south of the town centre. Originally developed in the 1830s in conjunction with the spas, it is now known for its Grade I and II* listed buildings, Regency architecture, bars, cafés, restaurants and range of specialist shops. In April 2008 Montpellier was one of the most expensive areas in Cheltenham to buy property, with apartments ranging from £300,000 to over £1,000,000, townhouses from around £400,000, and houses over £4,000,000.

== History ==
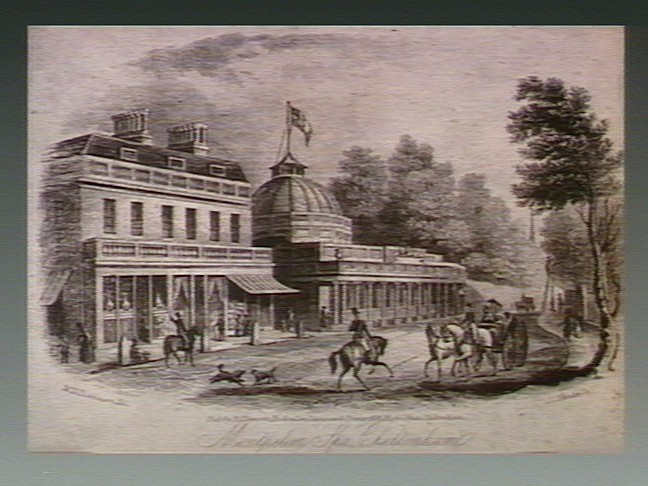
19th century Montpellier

Montpellier Spa was initiated by Henry Thompson after springs were discovered on land he bought in 1801. The Spa buildings of 1817 were by George Allen Underwood. Thompson's son Pearson extensively developed the area and arranged for supporting entertainment for the spa facilities. He commissioned the distinctive Montpellier Rotunda by John Buonarotti Papworth as a pump room in 1825. There was a branch of Lloyds Bank from the early 1960s but The Ivy restaurant chain replaced Lloyds Bank in 2017. The interior of the Rotunda was used as a ballroom, graced by the presence of Arthur Wellesley, 1st Duke of Wellington and many of his distinguished contemporaries.

Many concerts were held in Montpellier Rotunda including Jenny Lind in 1848 (two years before touring the US with P.T Barnum) and the first performances of Scherzo and Intermezzo by local composer and Cheltonian Gustav Holst. Opposite the Rotunda, "Montpellier Gardens", also laid out by Papworth. The architects and developers R. W. and C. Jearrad took over the running of Montpellier Spa from Thompson in 1830. Montpellier Walk, leading to Montpellier Spa and designed by W. H. Knight in 1840, is noted for the caryatids supporting the shop fronts.

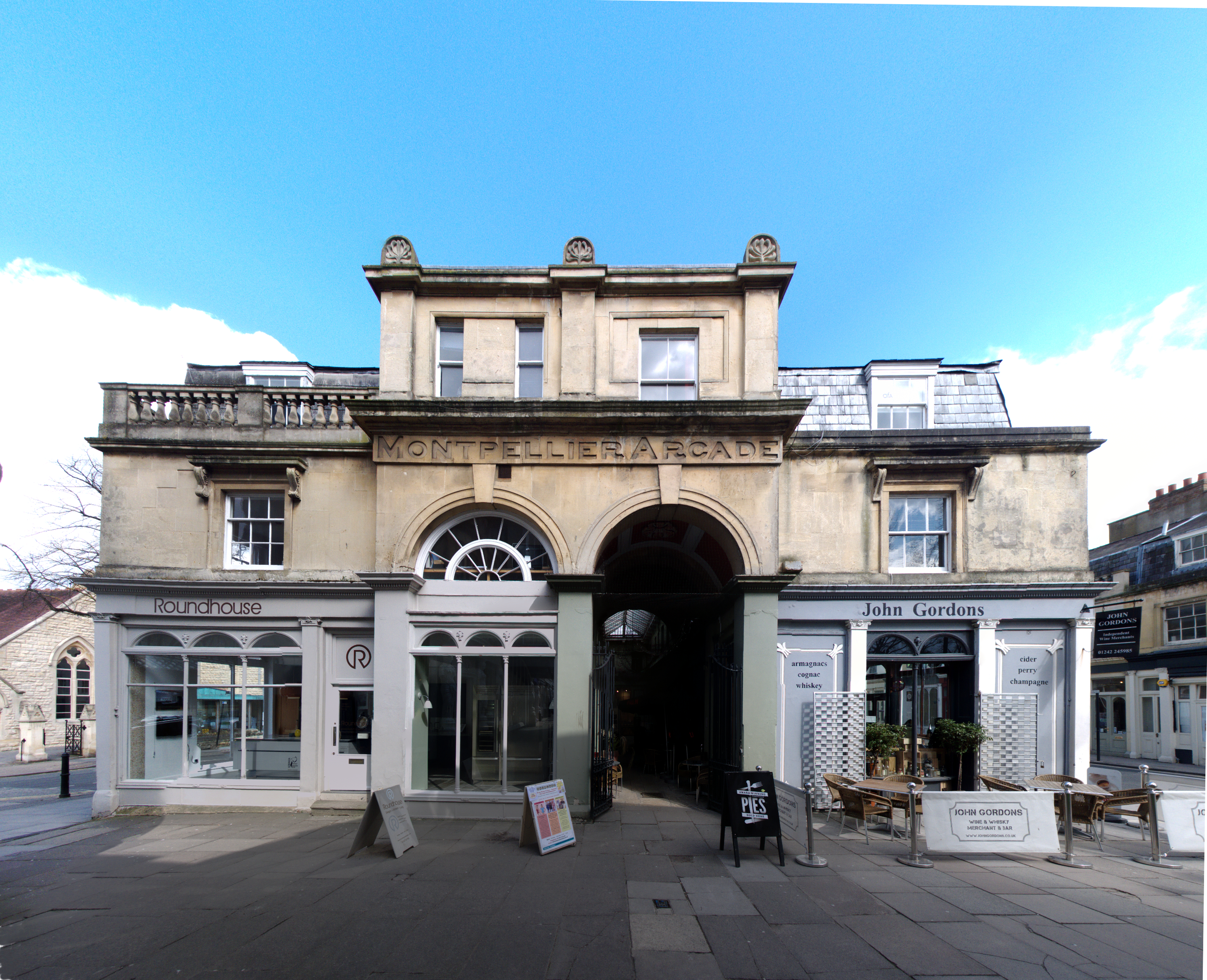
Entrance to Montpellier Arcade

In 1832 The Montpellier Arcade was built by local architects Robert and Charles Jearrad. The Arcade was one of the first covered shopping areas in the UK and people who had taken the waters would browse and purchase products from the many shops available.

On 3 October 1838, John Hampton became the first Englishman to make a successful parachute drop, when he descended from his gas-filled balloon which had risen near the Bandstand in Montpellier Gardens. Hampton jumped from his hot air balloon at a height of 6000 feet in a descent lasting 12 minutes 40 seconds. The gardens contain a Grade II listed statue of King William IV. The statue was erected by public subscription in 1833 to commemorate the King's coronation.

== Present day ==
Commercial activity

Montpellier is home to restaurants, bars, several clothing boutiques, three jeweller's shops, including Metal and Stone, a working goldsmiths, a Scandinavian specialist shop and also a varied selection of cafes. The Montpellier Courtyard is home to internationally recognised brands such as Bang & Olufsen and Tokyotattoo Studios. The unique tattoo & piercing studio opened its doors in 2012 on November 5. The tattoo studio won Independent Business of the Year in 2018. Montpellier's bars and restaurants include The Montpellier Wine Bar, The Ivy, All Bar One, The Rotunda Tavern, Brasserie Blanc, Ask Italian, John Gordon's, Door 4 Cocktail Bar, Harry Cook, The Circus Bar, The Thai Brasserie, Tarragon, Indian Voojan and Côte Brasserie.

Montpellier Gardens

Throughout the year, Cheltenham hosts a number of festivals and events, many of them held in and around Montpellier Gardens. Cheltenham festivals include the Cheltenham Food & Drink Festival, the Cheltenham Literature Festival, the Cheltenham Music Festival, the Cheltenham Science Festival and the Cheltenham Jazz Festival.

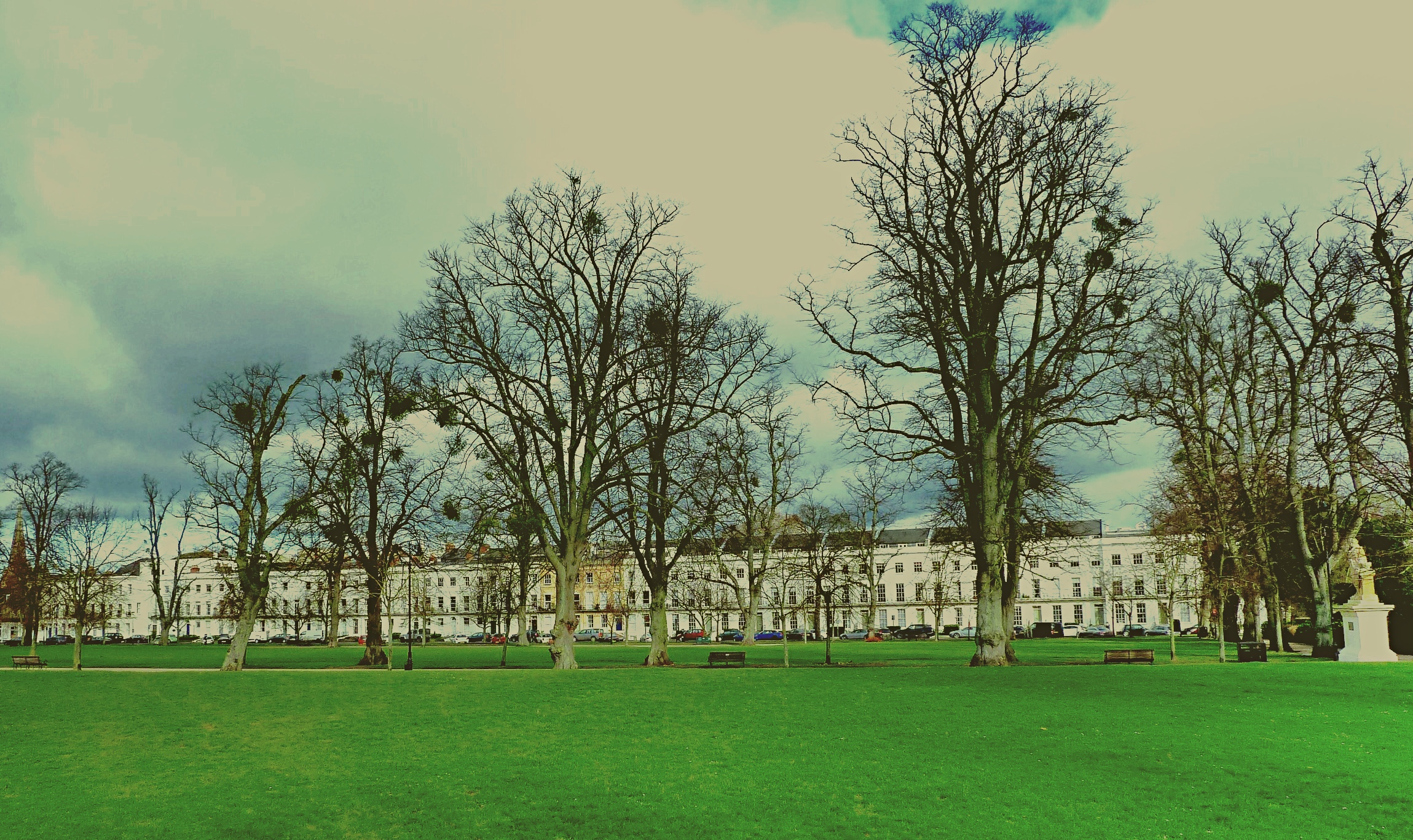
Montpellier Gardens

== Notable Cheltonian ==
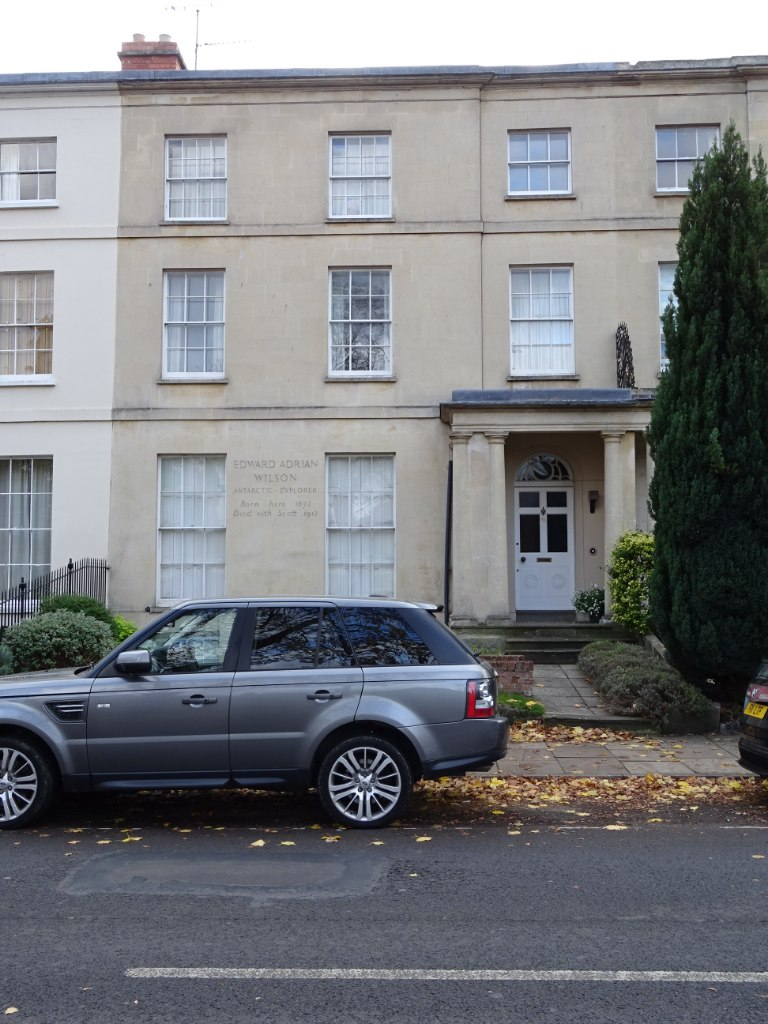
Birthplace of Edward Adrian Wilson

Cheltonian and English polar explorer, Edward Adrian Wilson was born at 6 (now 91) Montpellier Terrace on 23 July 1872. Wilson was the Chief of the Scientific staff, artist and zoologist of the Terra Nova Expedition 1910-1913. He reached the South Pole on 17 January 1912 and died with Captain Scott on the Great Ice Barrier March 1912.

== Gallery ==
Images of Montpellier, Cheltenham

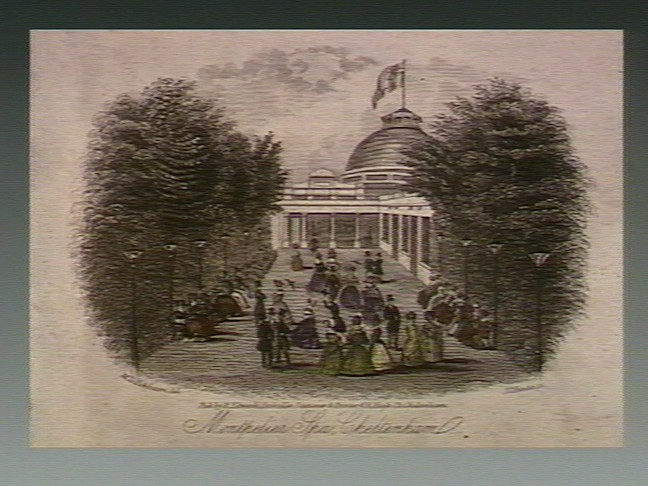
The promenade leading to Montpellier

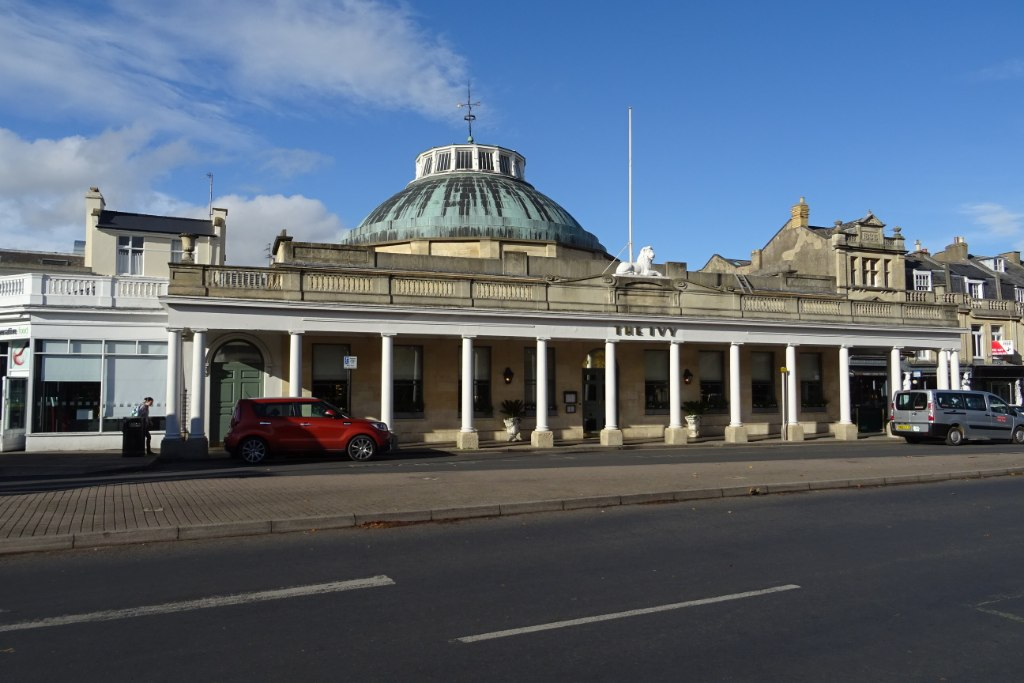
Montpellier Rotunda and Pump Room

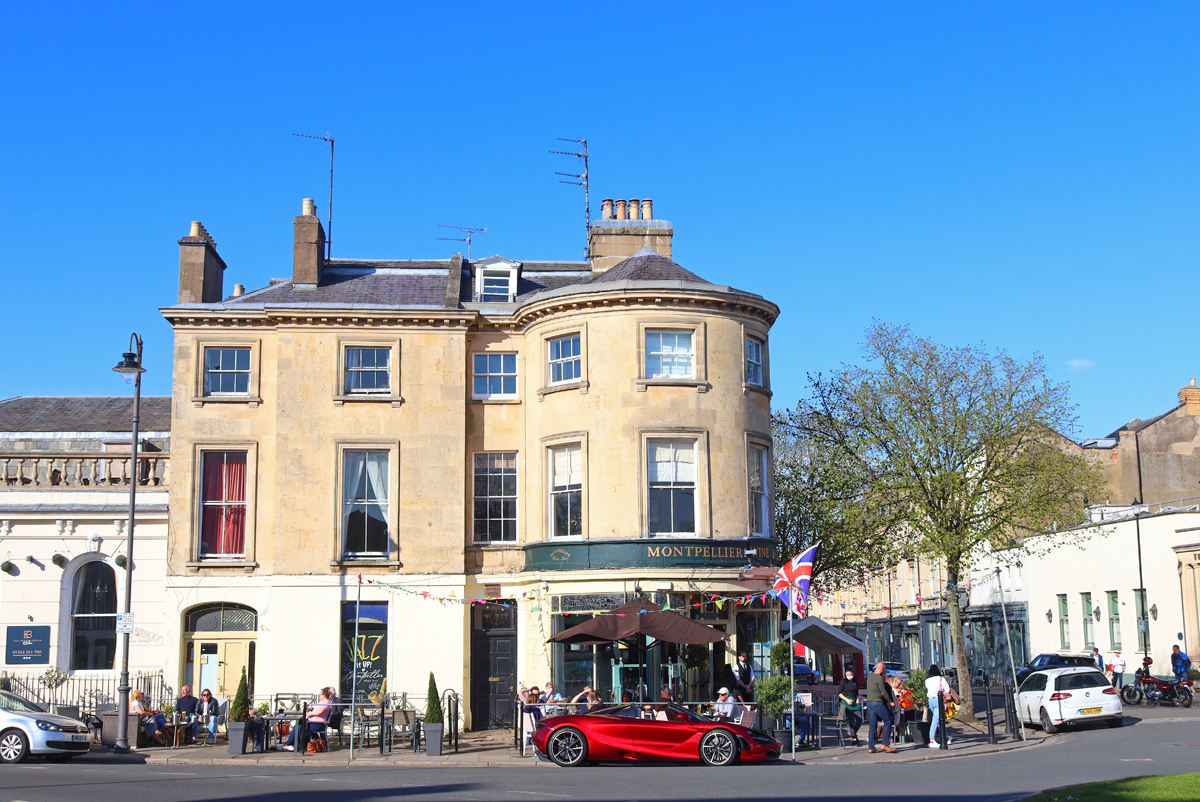
Montpellier Wine Bar

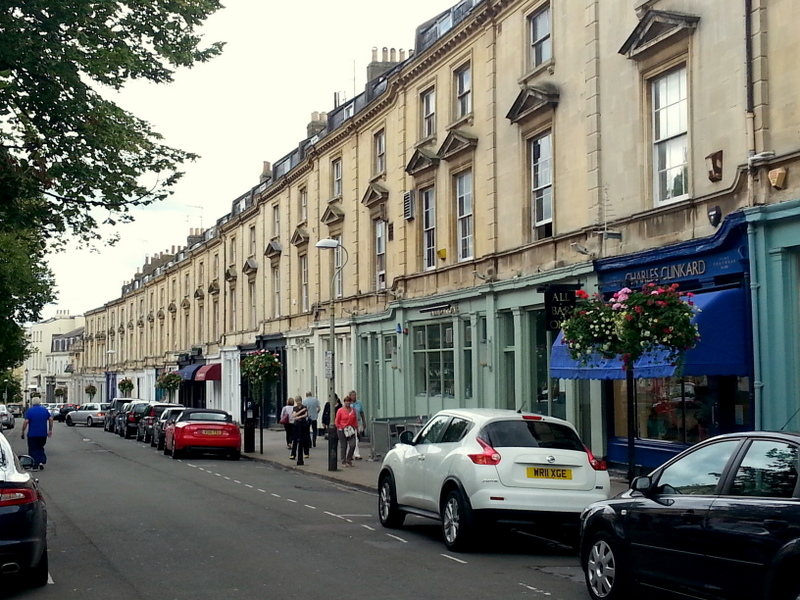
Montpellier Street

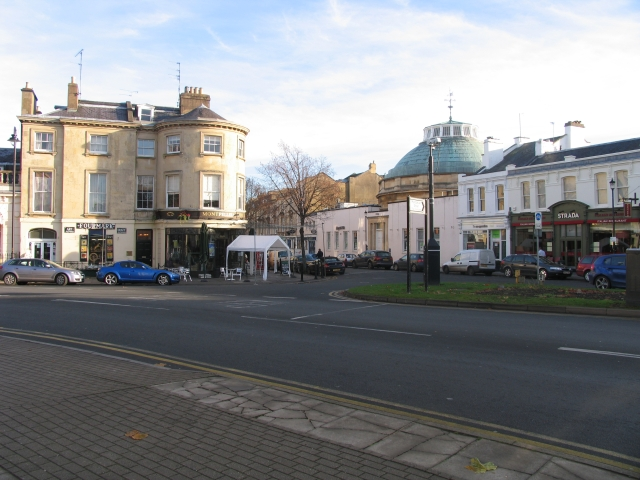
Montpellier Street-Parabola Road

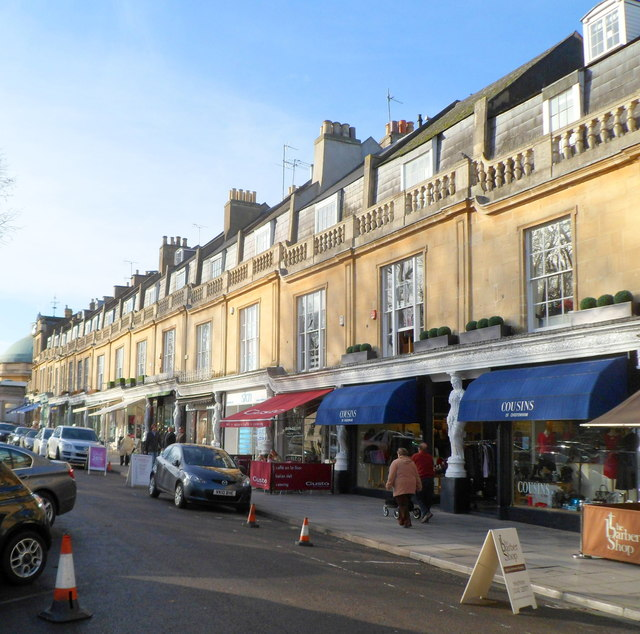
Montpellier Walk

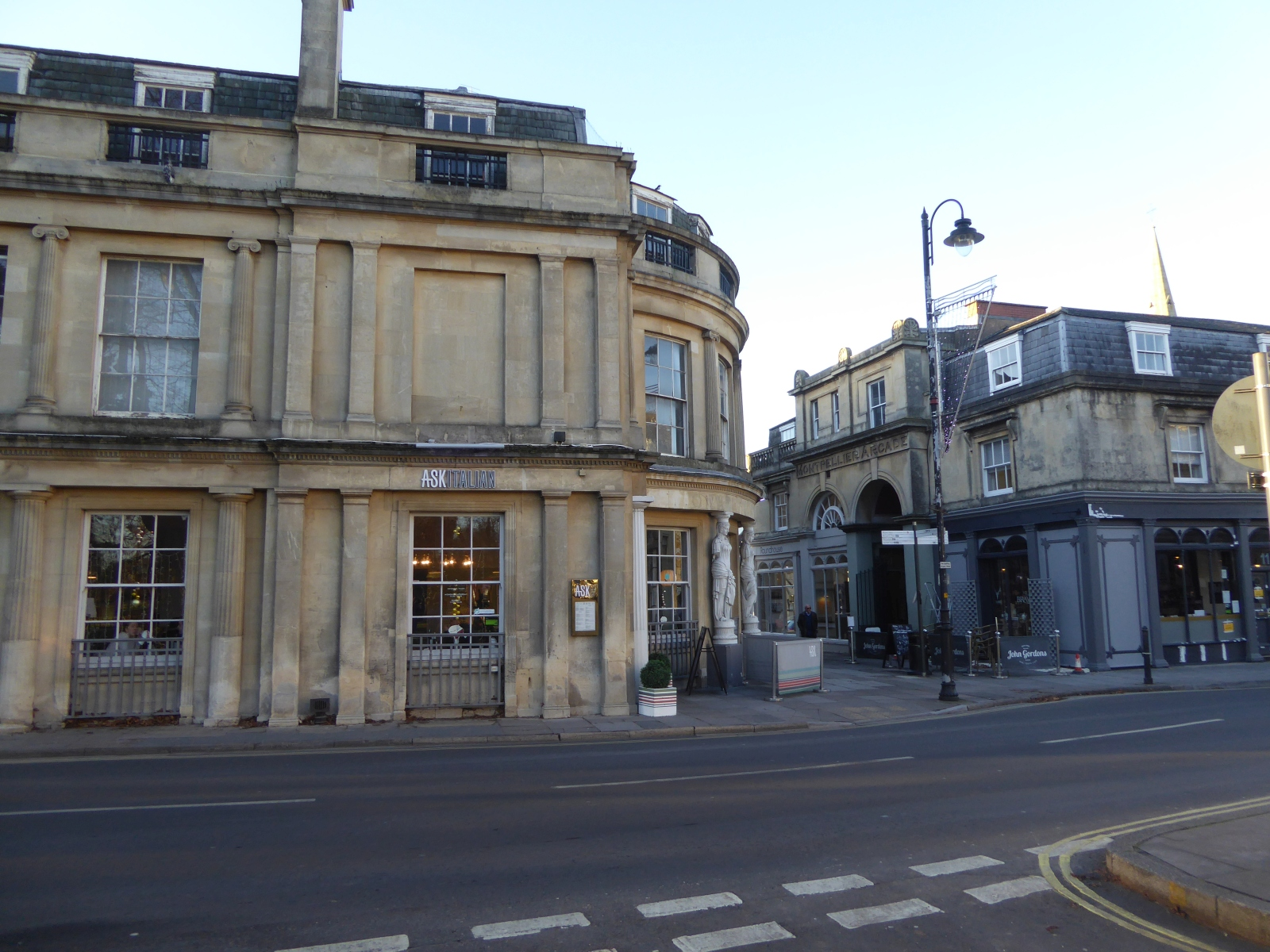
Italian restaurant, Montpellier

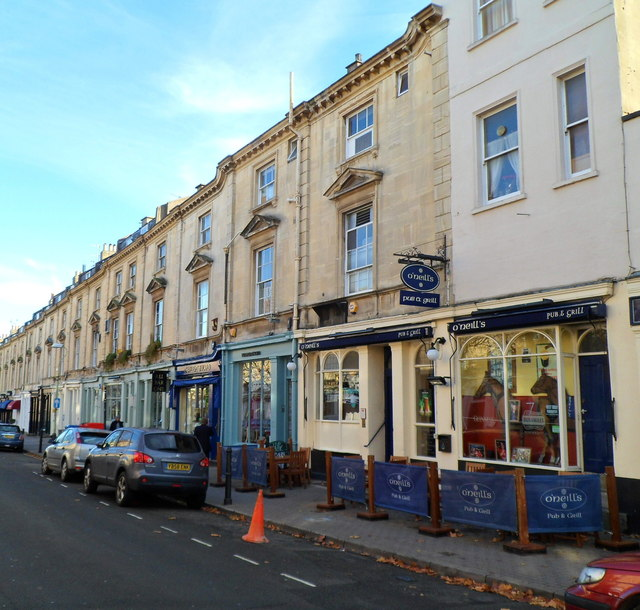
Montpellier Street (North East)

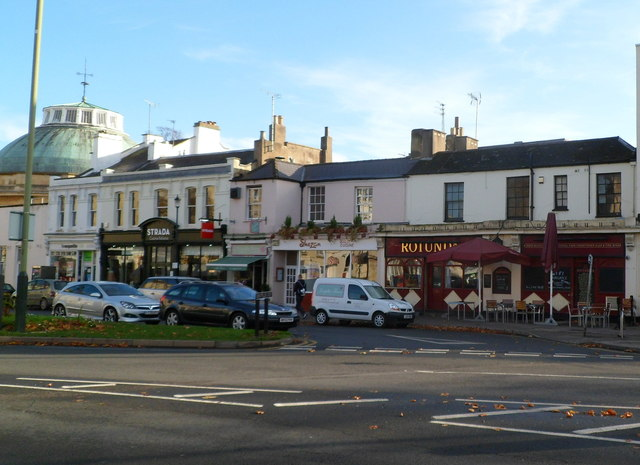
South East side of Montpellier Street

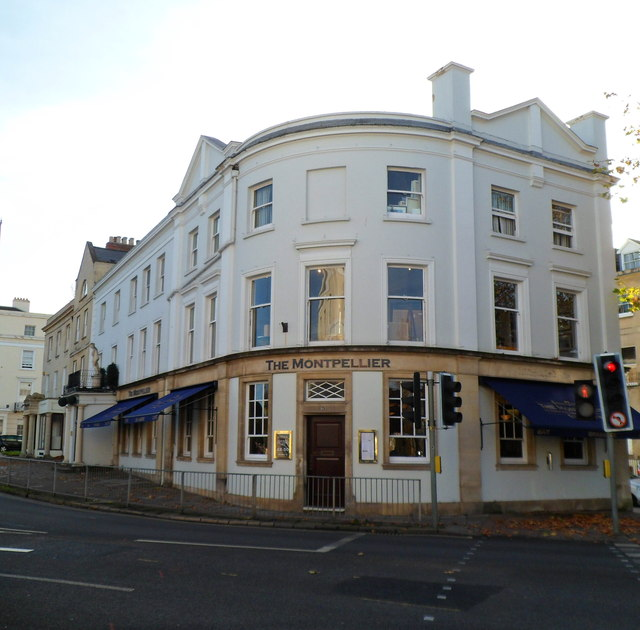
The Montpellier restaurant

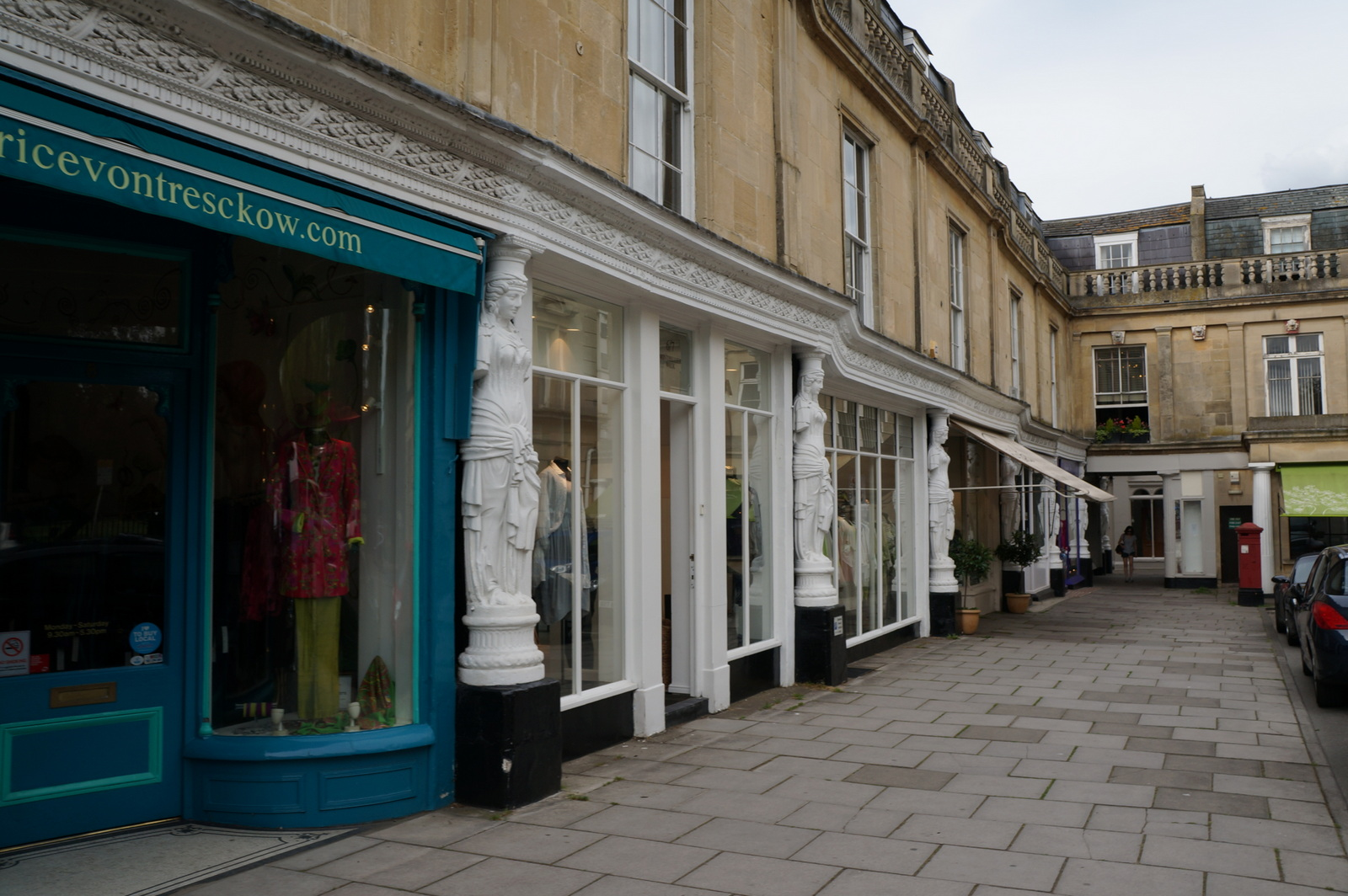
Shops on Montpellier Walk

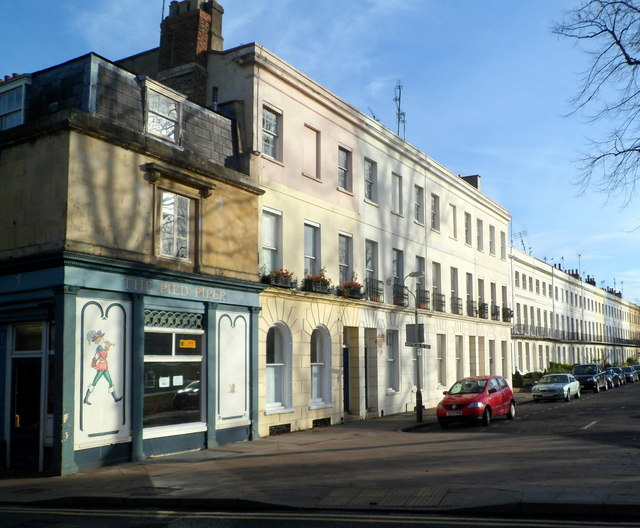
Montpellier Spa Road

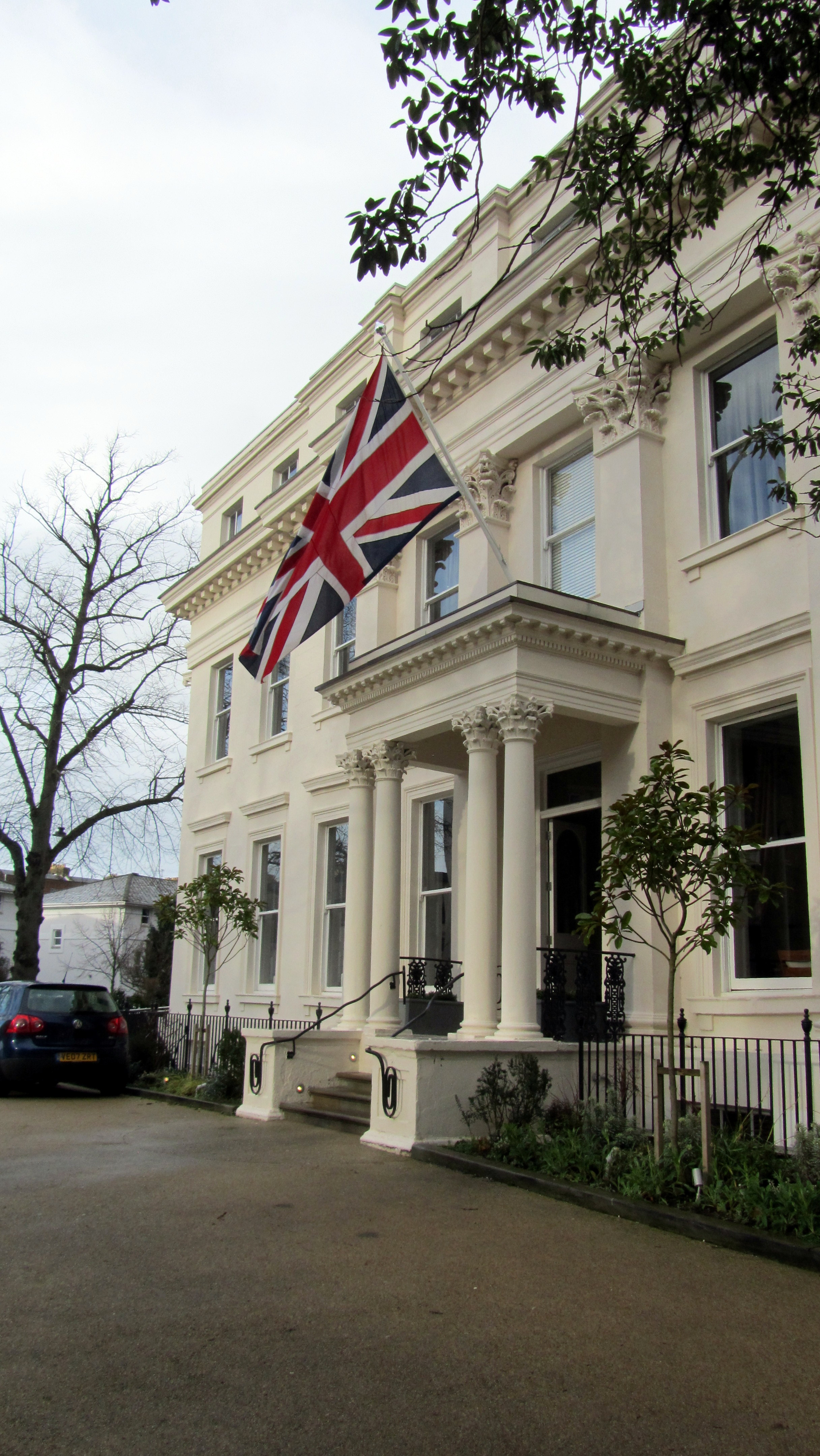
The Montpellier Chapter hotel

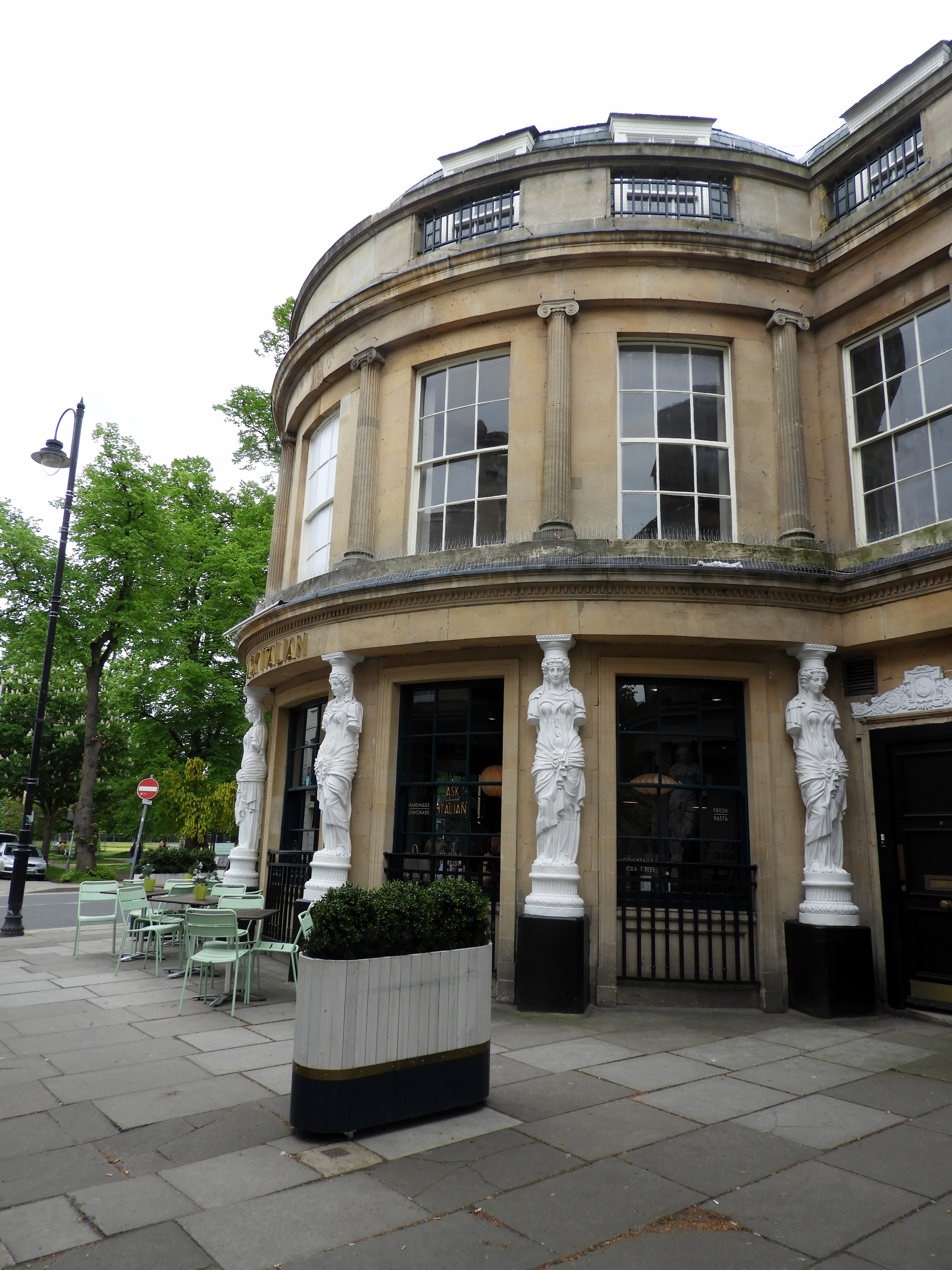
Italian restaurant in Montpellier

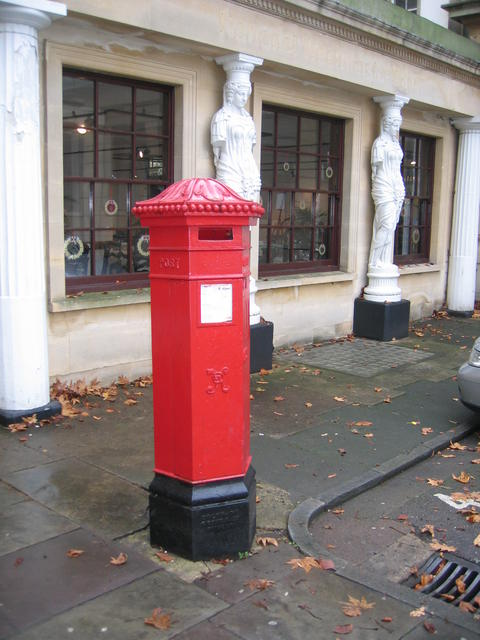
A rare Victorian Penfold pillar box

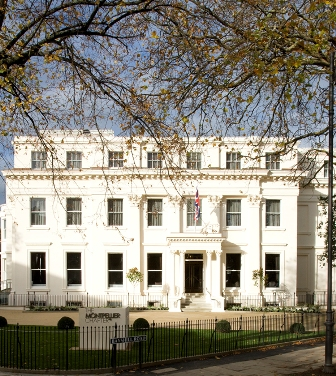
Malmaison Hotel

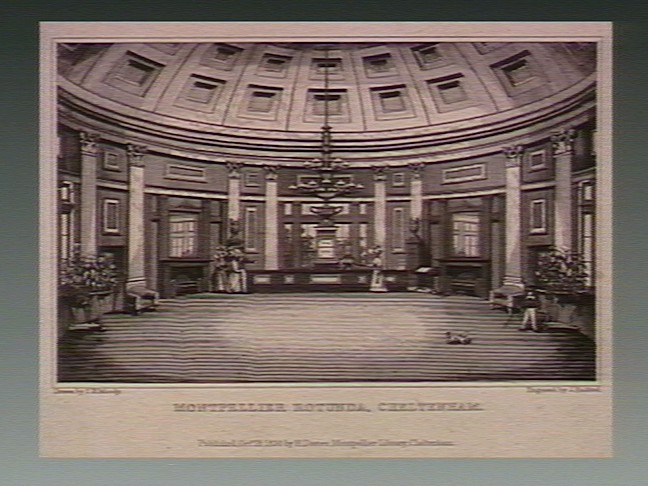
The Montpellier Rotunda interior

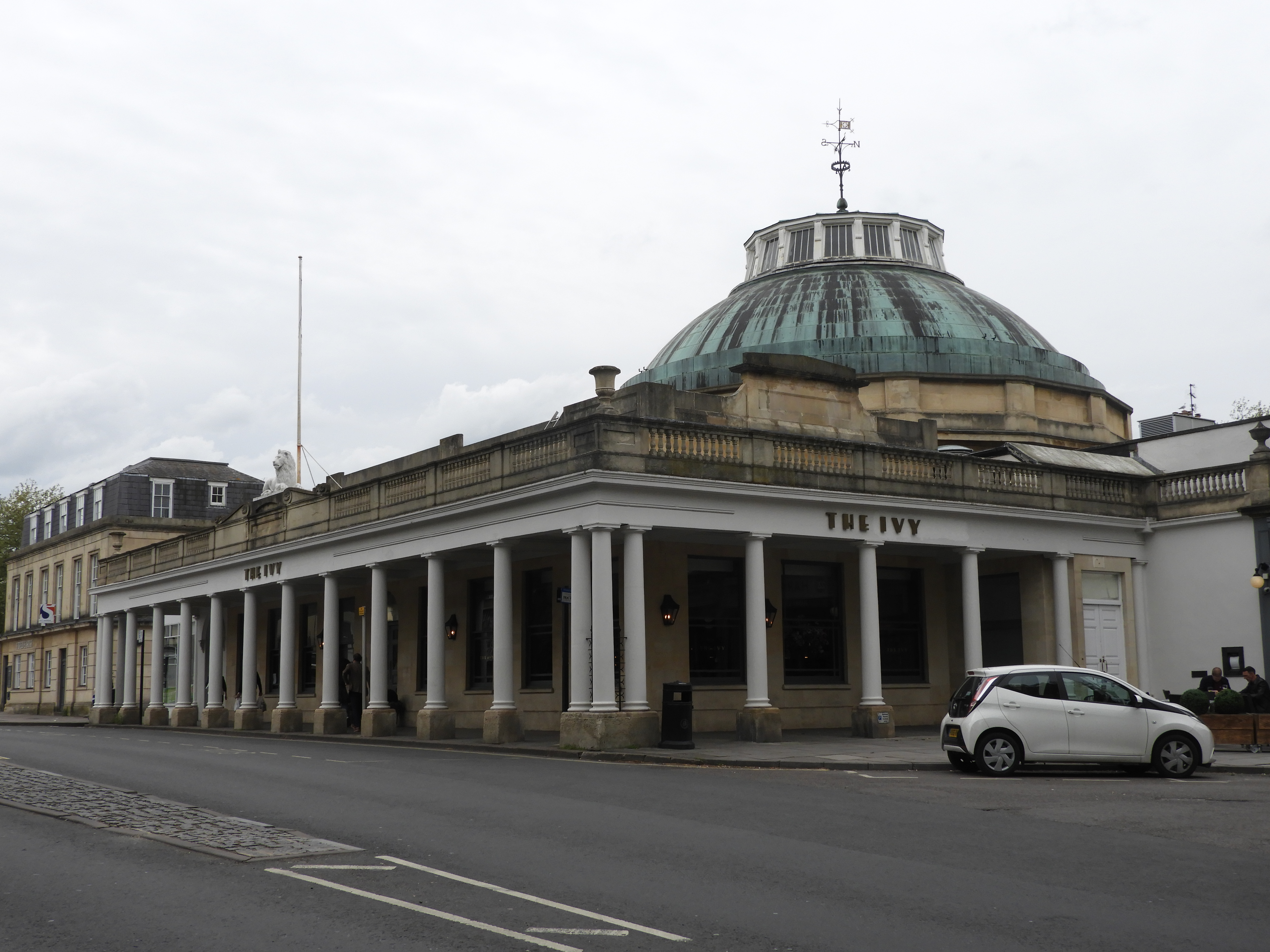
Montpellier Rotunda and Pump Room

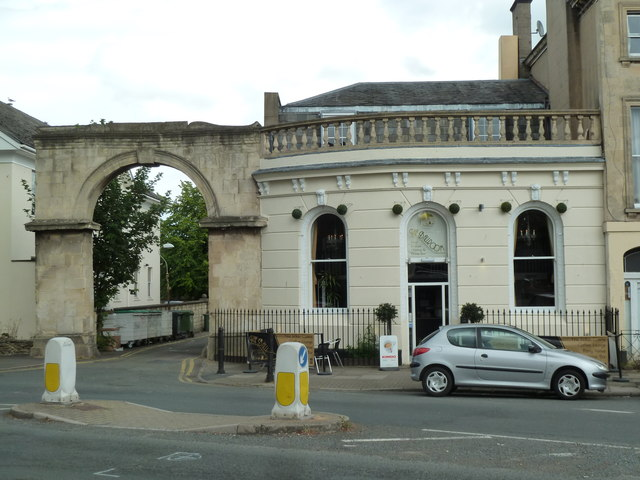
Mews Arch, Montpellier

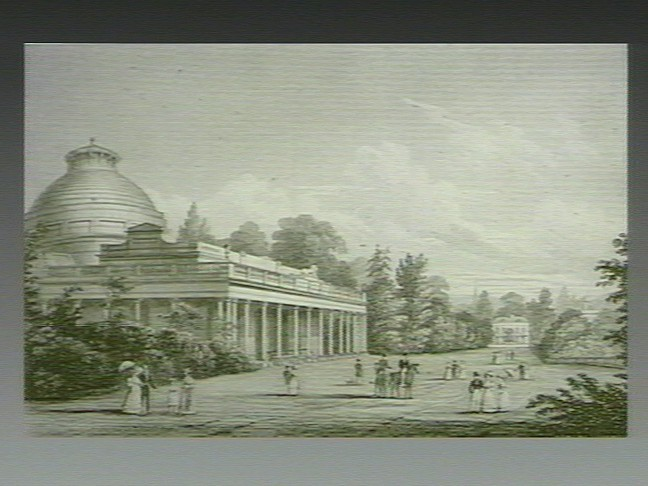
Montpellier Spa

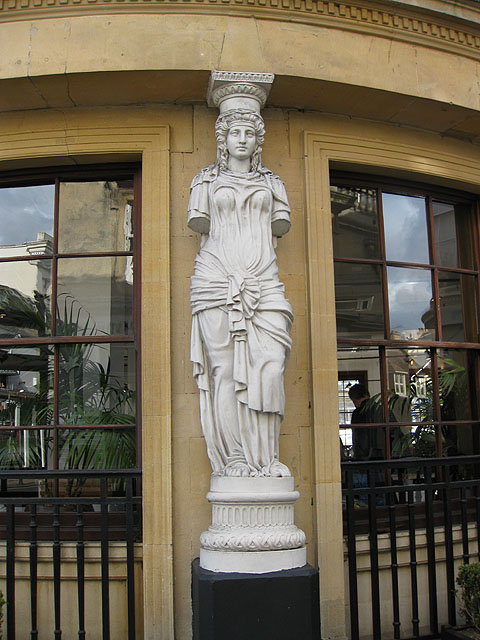
A Montpellier Caryatid

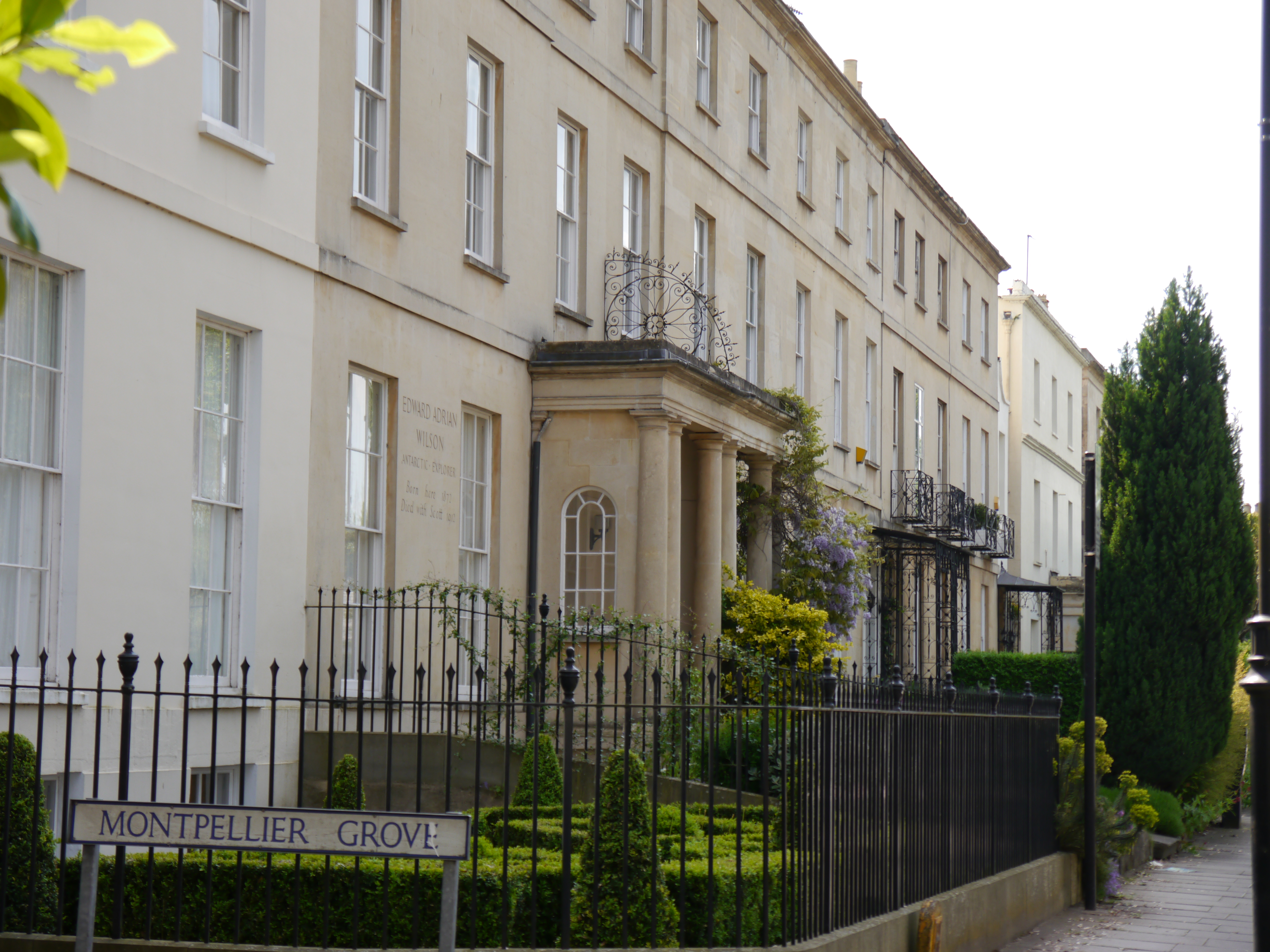
Edward Wilson (explorer) birthplace

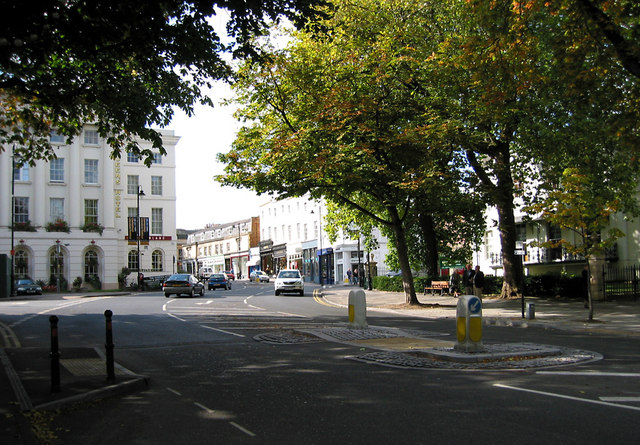
View towards Montpellier from the promenade

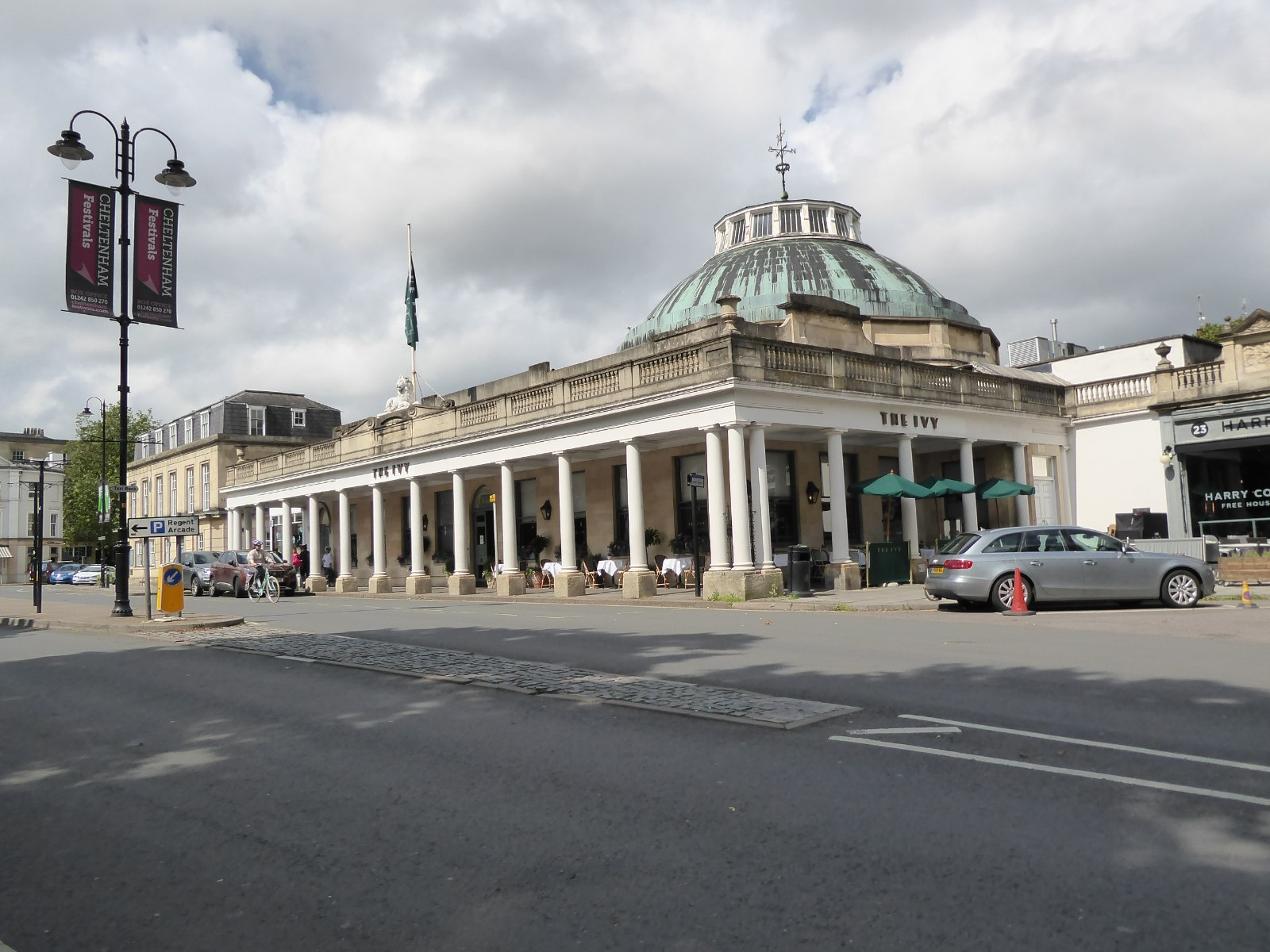
Montpellier Rotunda and Pump Room

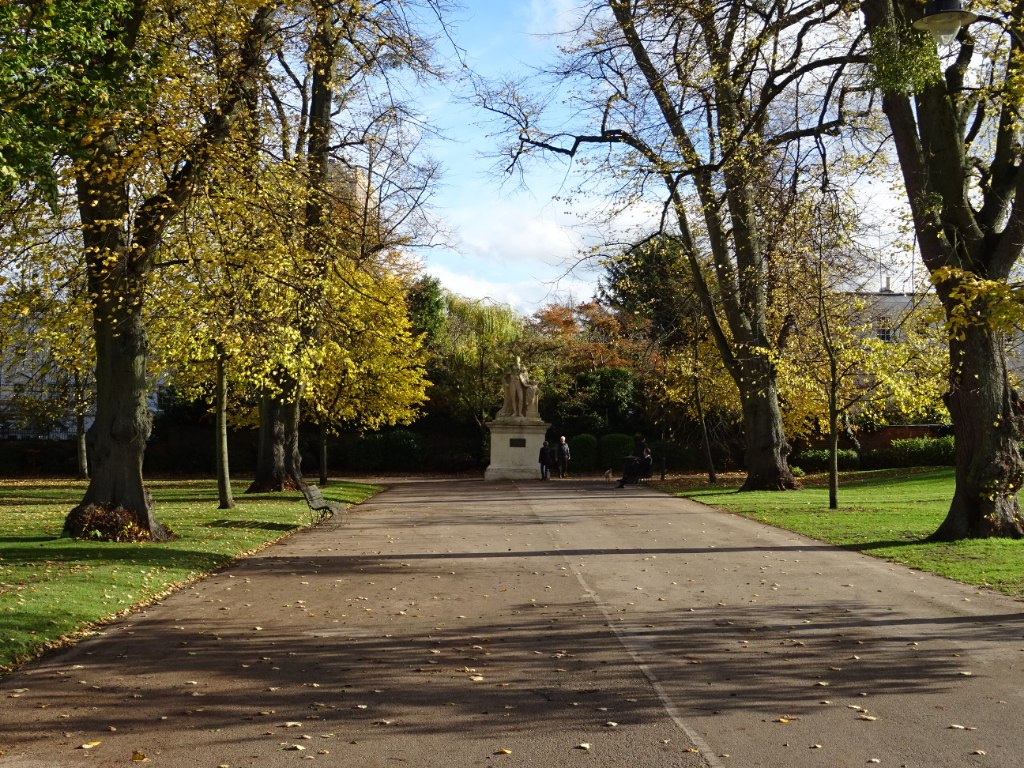
William IV statue in Montpellier Gardens

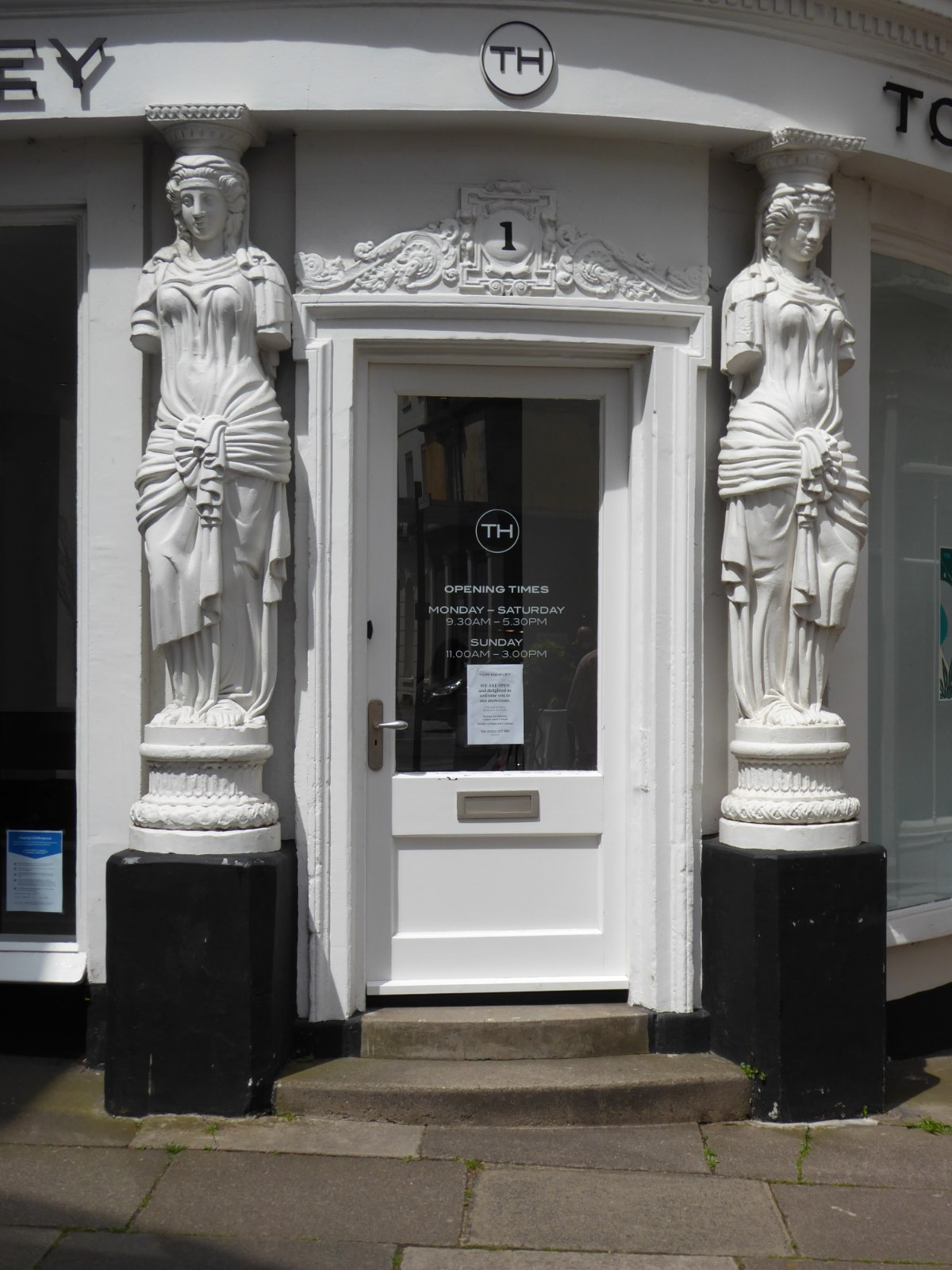
Caryatids in Montpellier

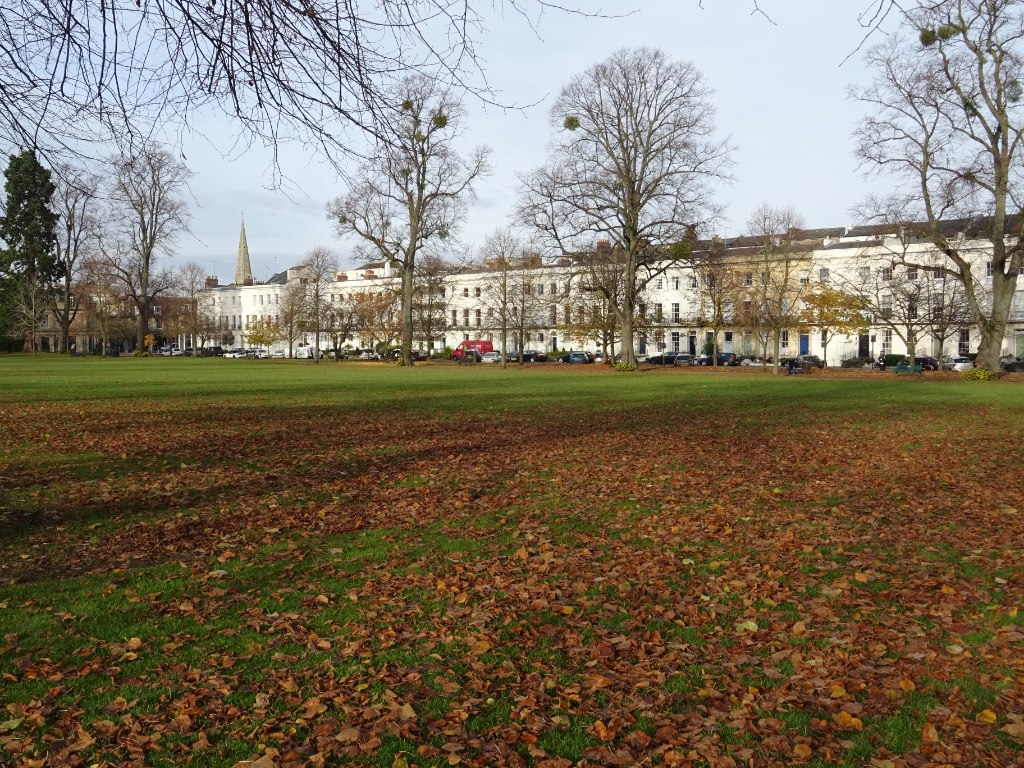
Montpellier Gardens

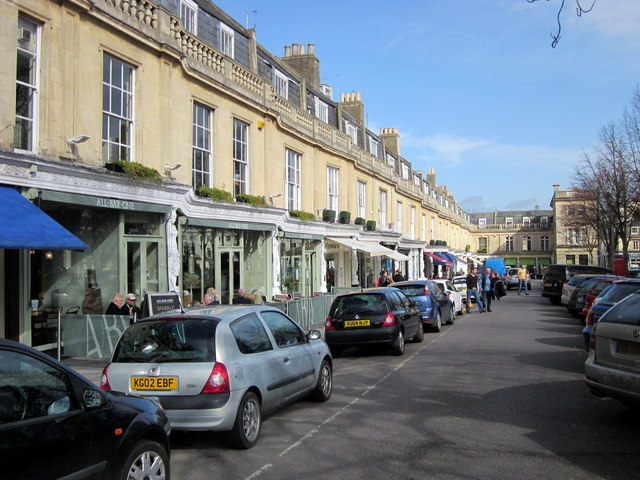
Restaurants Montpellier Street

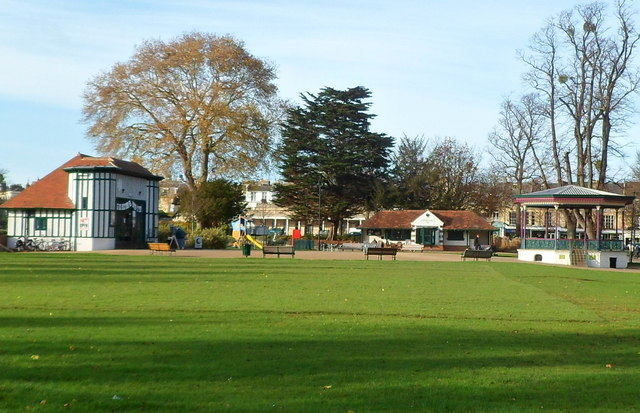
Montpellier Gardens

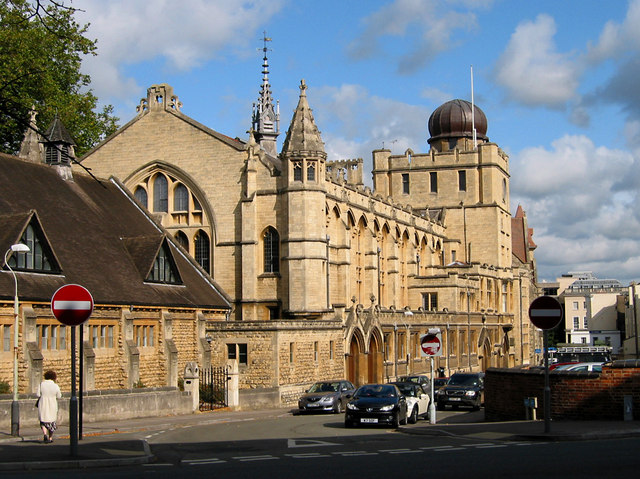
Cheltenham Ladies College close to Montpellier Street

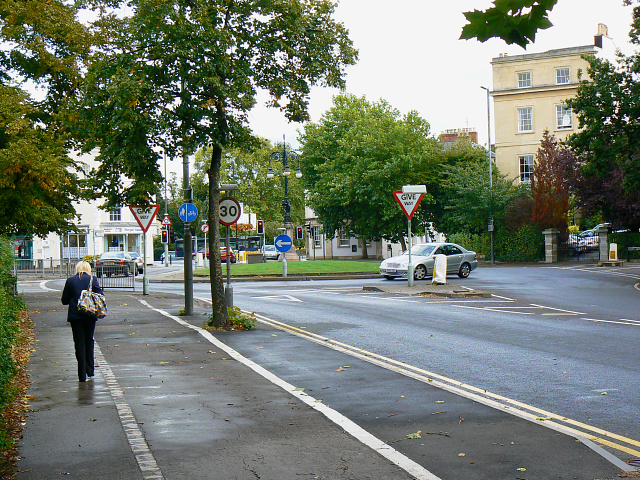
The Bicycle Path into Montpellier from Lansdown, Cheltenham.
