= John Papworth (plasterer) =

English plasterer and stuccoist 1750–1799)

John Papworth (1750–1799) was a plasterer and stuccoist working in London in the late 18th century.

== Biography ==
Papworth was of Italian origin, and was apprenticed to the celebrated stuccoist John Rose, later starting his own business. He was employed by the Scottish/Swedish architect Sir William Chambers on a number of his projects and has been described as "his favoured stuccoist".

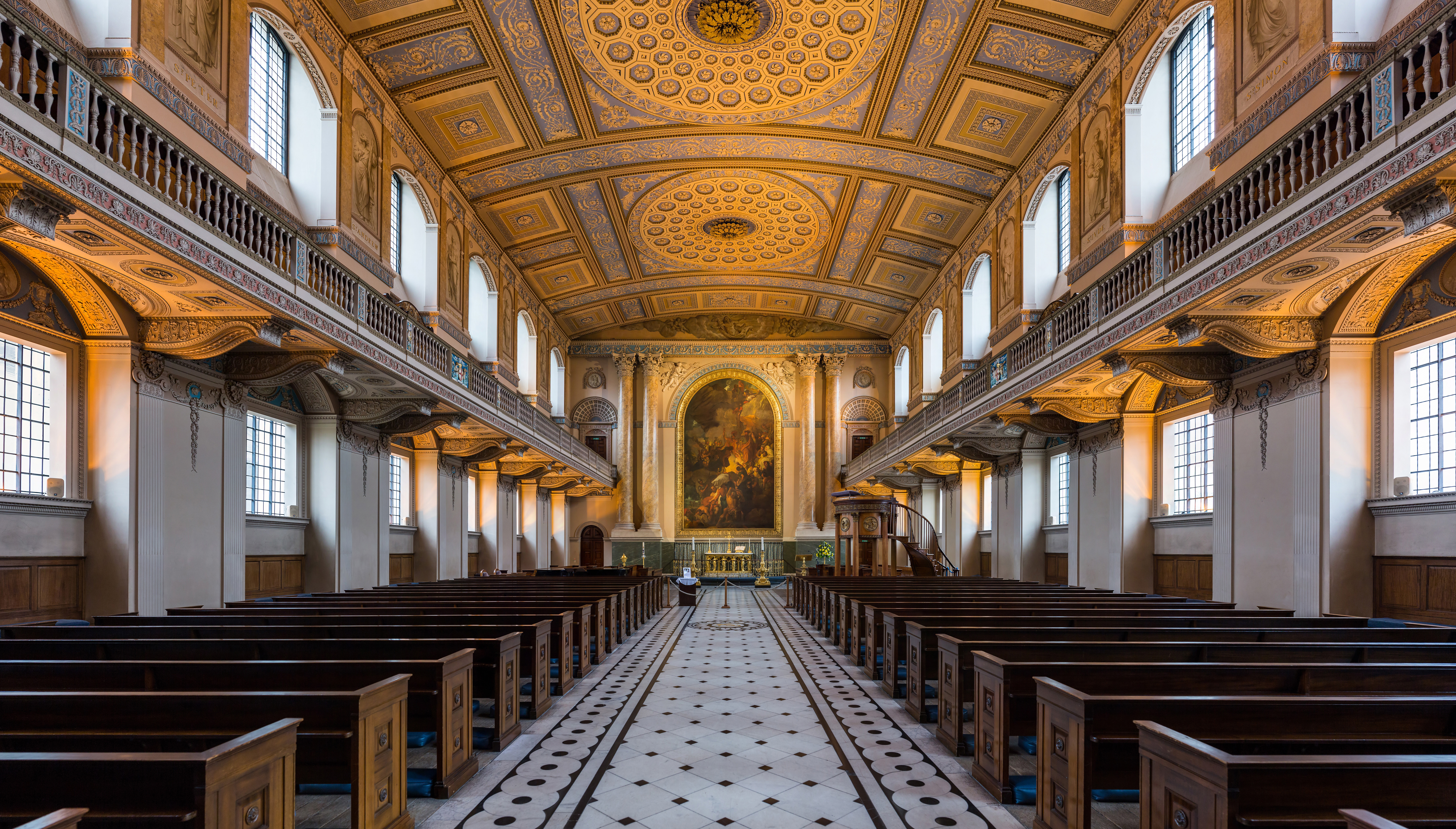
Chapel at Greenwich Hospital, as refitted by James Stuart after a fire

Papworth was master plasterer at St James's Palace and at Kensington Palace starting in 1780. He did the plasterwork in the Royal Academy Room at Somerset House, and the ornate ceilings in the chapel at Greenwich Hospital, London, when it was rebuilt in the 1780s by the architect James "Athenian" Stuart, after it had been destroyed by fire. In Scotland in 1781, he was employed by the architect Robert Milne on Inveraray Castle, Argyllshire; he submitted an invoice for £150 0s 6d for "Plaster work in casts, models and moulds, for ornamented ceilings and walls of hall and the dining room".

At Somerset House, in 1784, he collaborated with the plasterer Thomas Collins, and it is recorded that they jointly received £7,915 2s 8d. Between August and November 1789 he worked at the house of George Herbert, 2nd Earl of Powis in Berkeley Square where "taking down the ornamental frieze and architrave in the Front Drawing Room and repairing the cornice". By the late 1790s Papworth had premises at 86 Great Portland Street, London; which he shared with his son John Buonarotti Papworth, who was then beginning a career in architecture. At this time Chambers' offices were on nearby Norton Street.

== Family ==
Papworth was married to Charlotte (née Searle), the daughter of the potter Robert Searle, and had twelve children. He described himself as an "architect, plasterer and builder", his background being in decorative plasterwork, and he dominated the trade in London in the late 18th century, employing more than 500 men. His eldest son, Thomas, carried on the business after his death, and his second son, John Buonarotti Papworth also continued the family tradition, being described as "one of the most versatile architects and decorative artists of the period". His third son, George, was likewise an architect, active mainly in Ireland. Papworth's descendants included many eminent architects like John Woody Papworth and writers on artistic themes.
