= Christ Church, Cheltenham =

Coordinates: 51°53′56.4″N 2°5′19.21″W

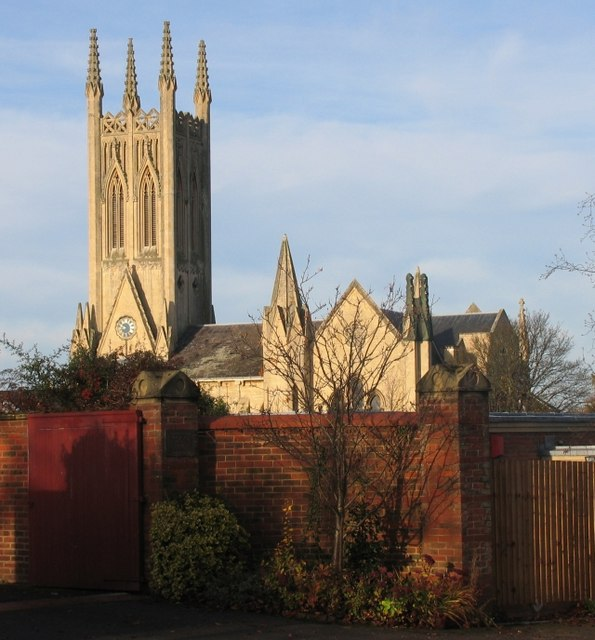
- Christ Church, Cheltenham
- Christ Church, Cheltenham
- Denomination: Church of England
- Churchmanship: Evangelical
- Website: Christ Church, Cheltenham

History
- Dedication: 1840

Administration
- Province: Canterbury
- Diocese: Gloucester
- Archdeaconry: Cheltenham
- Deanery: Cheltenham
- Parish: Cheltenham Christ Church

Clergy
- Vicar: Revd Simon Heron

Christ Church, Cheltenham is an Anglican church and congregation located at Christchurch and Malvern Roads, in the Lansdown district of Cheltenham, Gloucestershire, United Kingdom.

The Gothic Revival church building was designed by architects Robert W. & Charles Jearrad, construction began in November 1837, and the church was consecrated on 21 January 1840.

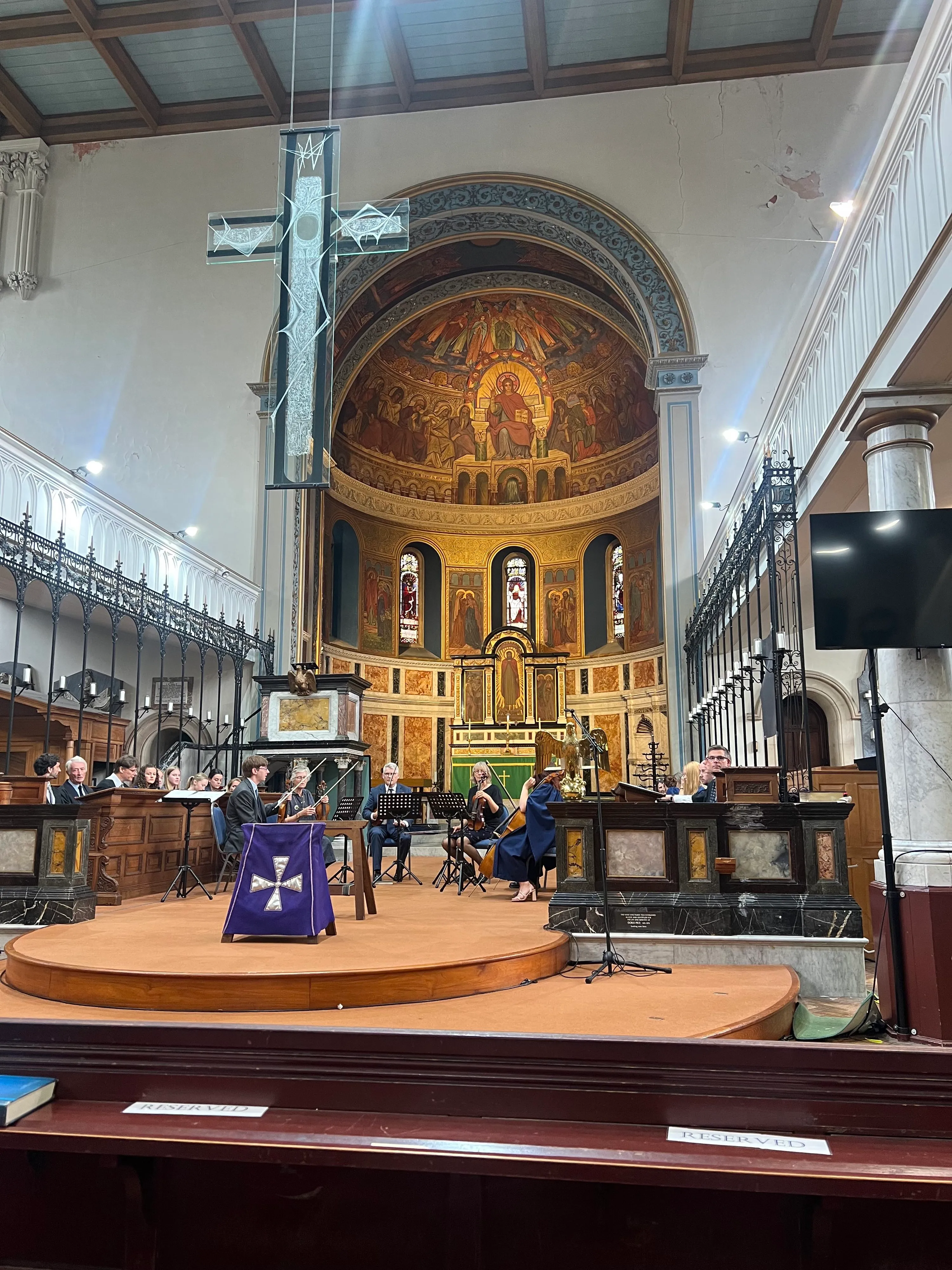
Glass Hanging Cross by Bryant Fedden

The interior features a hanging glass cross, engraved by the artist Bryant Fedden.
