= Cheltenham Food & Drink Festival =

The Cheltenham Food & Drink Festival was founded in 2008 as an out-door festival held in Montpellier Gardens, Cheltenham to promote awareness of food, drinks, chefs, and restaurants. The focus is on Cheltenham and the county of Gloucestershire but has national exhibitors as well as local exhibitors. The Festival is held over three days each June and has around 19,000 visitors each year. The Hairy Bikers, Masterchef 2009 winner Mat Follas, Antonio Carluccio, and Celebrity Masterchef 2011 winner Phil Vickery have all cooked at the Festival.
