= John Buonarotti Papworth =

English architect, artist and a founder member of RIBA

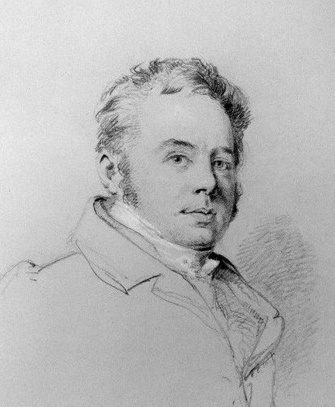
- Born: 24 January 1775; Marylebone, London, England
- Died: 16 June 1847 (aged 72); Little Paxton, Huntingdonshire, England
- Occupation: Architect
- Spouse: Jane Wapshott

John Buonarotti Papworth (24 January 1775 – 16 June 1847) was a British architect, artist and a founder member of the Royal Institute of British Architects.

He adopted the middle name "Buonarotti" in around 1815.

As well as being active in the UK, he designed a monument in Belgium and designed buildings intended for Germany and the USA.

== Life ==
Papworth was born in Marylebone, London, in 1775 to John Papworth and his wife Charlotte (née Searle). He was one of twelve children and the second of six sons. His father described himself as an "architect, plasterer and builder". His background was in decorative plasterwork, and he dominated the trade in London, employing more than 500 men.

At the recommendation of Sir William Chambers he spent two years as a pupil of the architect John Plaw and was then apprenticed to the builder Thomas Wapshott, whose daughter Jane he then married.

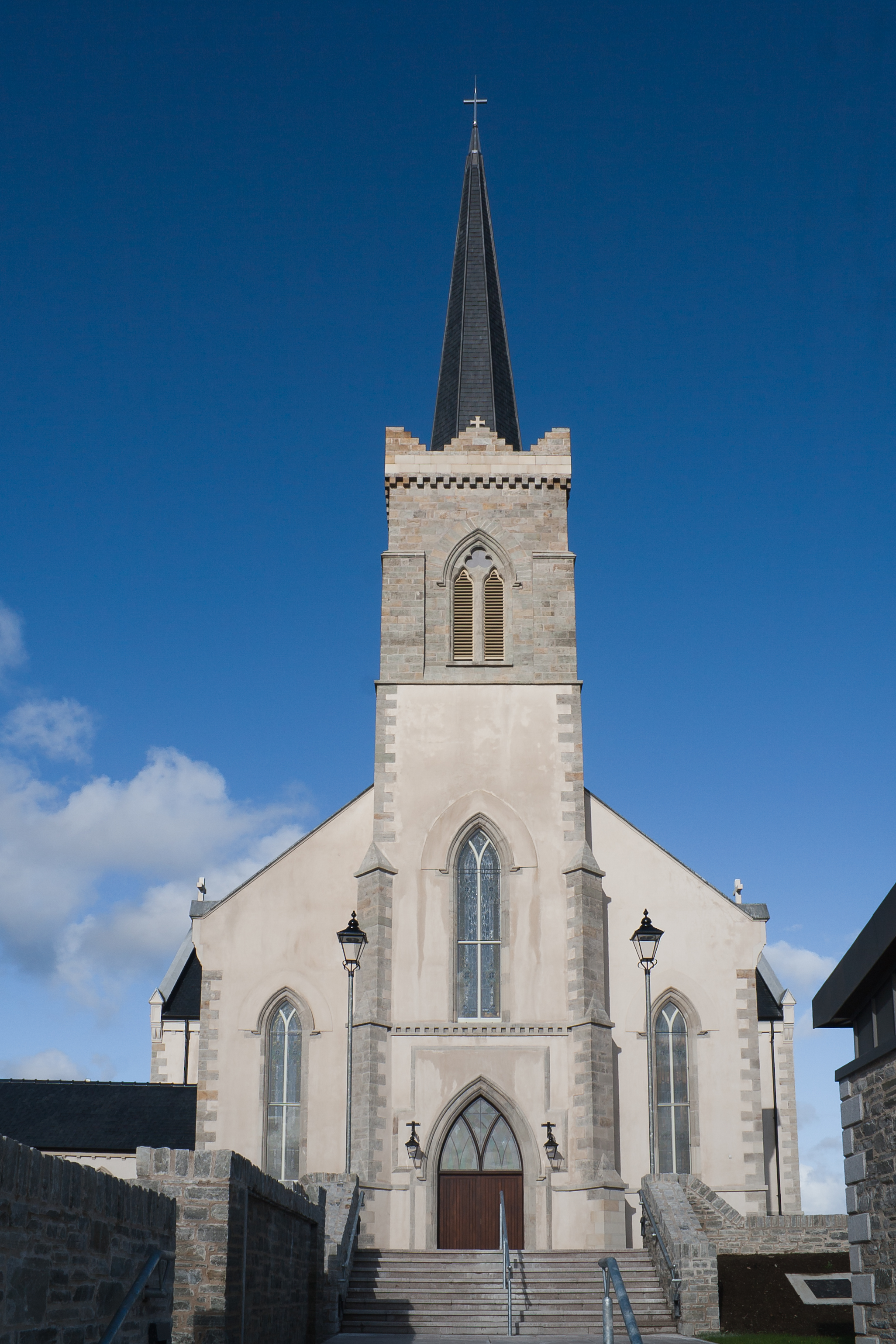
St Mary of the Visitation church in Killybegs, designed by Papworth in an early pointed Gothic Revival style between 1834 and 1839

John Summerson described Papworth as "one of the most versatile architects and decorative artists of the period". In London he designed shop fronts (one, for a tea merchant in Ludgate Hill, was in a "Chinese" style) and warehouses, and built or remodelled many villas for middle-class clients in the countryside. At Cheltenham he laid out the Montpellier Estate, and extended the Montpellier Pump Room (1825–26), with a domed rotunda inspired by the Pantheon.

In 1827 William Bullock commissioned Papworth to plan the layout and design various classes of building for a new city to be called "Hygeia" in the United States, on land he had bought stretching about two-and-a-half miles along the Ohio River, opposite Cincinnati. Bullock published the plans, hoping to attract purchasers for the plots, but the scheme came to nothing.

He exhibited at the Royal Academy between 1816 and 1841. His address is given as Bath Place, New Road, London, until 1816, and 10 Caroline Street, Bedford Square, from 1823. In the latter year he is described as "Architect to the King of Wirtemberg", and exhibited a design for a "Palace at Canstadt for the King of Wirtemberg".

In 1838 he became director of the newly established Government School of Design.

He married Mary Ann Lay on 8 August 1817 at St Pancras, London. They had two sons, John Woody Papworth, and Wyatt Papworth. His brother George Papworth acted as his clerk of works until 1804 and then practised as an architect in Ireland. He died on 16 June 1847, aged 72 at his residence, Park End, St Neots and was he buried at St James, Little Paxton, Huntingdonshire.

== Publications ==
He contributed designs to Ackermann's Repository of the Arts for almost 20 years. In addition, he published the following books:

- Essay on the Causes of the Dry Rot in Buildings, 1803
- Select Views of London, 1816
- Rural Residences, 1818, reissued in 1832
- Hints on Ornamental Gardening, 1823, reissued around 1826 with an unchanged title page but with some plates labeled in Spanish
- Specimens of Decoration in the Italian Style, 1844

== Archive ==
His archive of drawings is in Drawings and Archives Collections of the Royal Institute of British Architects, which has put a number of images on line including illustrations from "Rural Residences".

== Works ==
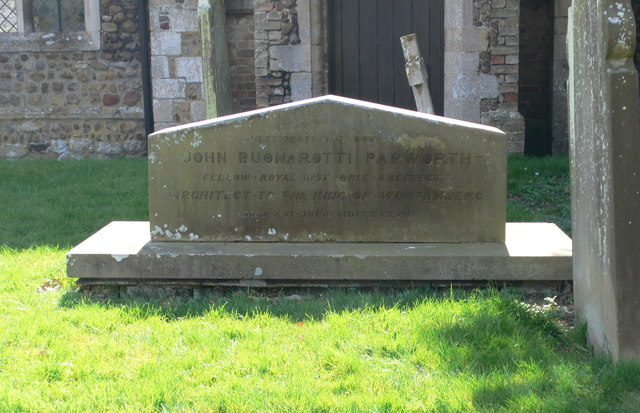
Papworth's tomb at Little Paxton, Huntingdonshire

- Mansion for the Earl of Lucan at Laleham, Middlesex (1806)
- Factory at 69 Holborn, London, for the engineer Alexander Galloway
- St Julien's, a cottage orné near Sevenoaks, for Robert Herries
- Villa (later known as Leigham House) on Brixton Hill, Surrey (now South London) for George Fuller. Demolished 1908.
- Gallery of the Egyptian Hall, Piccadilly, London, for William Bullock (1819)
- Refurbishment of Boodle's Club, St James's Street, London (1821–34)
- St Bride's Avenue, London (1823–30)
- Rebuilding of 96 Strand, London, for Rudolf Ackermann
- 94 Holborn Hill, London, "the first of the gin-palaces"
- Montpellier Pump Room Rotunda and Gardens, Cheltenham (1825–26) for Pearson Thompson.
- Lansdown Place and Lansdown Crescent, Cheltenham, for RW and C Jearrad (1825–29)
- St James's Church, Cheltenham (1826–32), more recently a Zizi Pizza restaurant
- Plans for Hygeia, a utopian community on the Ohio River, for William Bullock (1827)
- Willenhall House, Barnet, for Thomas Wyatt (1829)
- Alterations to Basildon Park's Palladian mansion and grounds for James Morrison (after 1838)
- St Mary of the Visitation Church in Killybegs, County Donegal, designed between 1834 and 1839

== Sources ==
- Cherry, Bridget; Pevsner, Nikolaus (1990) [1983]. London 2: South. The Buildings of England. London: Penguin Books. p. 377.
- Colvin, H.M. (2008) [1954]. A Biographical Dictionary of British Architects, 1600–1840. New Haven: Yale University Press. ISBN 978-0-300-07207-5.
- Graves, Algernon (1906). The Royal Academy: A Complete Dictionary of Contributors from its Foundations in 1769 to 1904. Vol. 6. London: Henry Graves. p. 50.
- McHardie, G (1977). The Office of J.B. Papworth. Catalogue of Drawings in the RIBA Collections.
- Papworth, Wyatt (1879). John B. Papworth, Architect to the King of Wurtemburg: a Brief Record of his Life and Works. London.
- Summerson, John (1970). Architecture in Britain, 1530 to 1830. Pelican History of Art. Harmondsworth: Penguin Books. p. 521.
- Welcome to Basildon Park. National Trust. 2009. (information leaflet)
