= Montpellier Rotunda =

Building in Cheltenham, Gloucestershire, England

Coordinates: 51°53′44″N 2°4′57″W

Caricature by George Cruikshank of the Morning Promenade outside the Rotunda, 1833

Caricature by George Cruikshank of the Rotunda in session, 1833

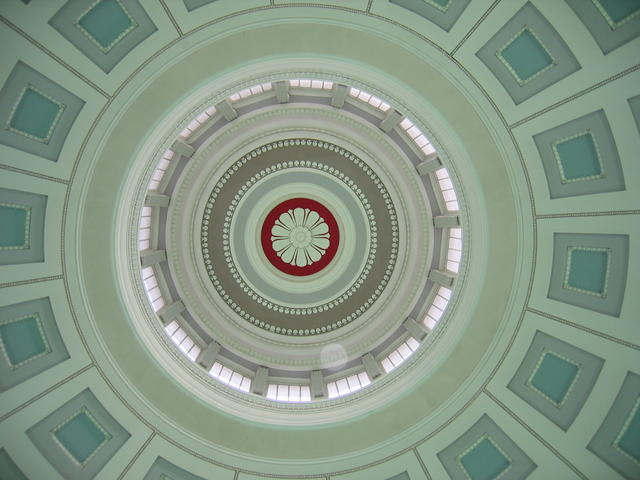
The dome from below

Montpellier Rotunda is a Grade I listed building in Montpellier, Cheltenham, England.

== History ==
In 1809, Henry Thompson constructed a wooden pavilion with a colonnade as part of the wider development of the "Montpellier Spa" on land previously known as Trafalgar Field. By 1817 it had been rebuilt in stone as the Montpellier Spa became increasingly popular. Thompson employed the architect George Allen Underwood, who completed the building with a statue of a crouching lion on the parapet.

In 1826, Henry Thompson's son Pearson Thompson asked John Buonarotti Papworth to oversee the project and it was during this period that the dome was erected. The dome is inspired by Rome's Pantheon and has almost identical proportions. The building was used as a pumproom, with water from local wells, and ballroom with an additional billiard room and reading room.

Concerts were held in the building including Jenny Lind in 1848 and the first performance of a Scherzo by local composer Gustav Holst in 1891.

The Spa and surrounding gardens were purchased by the Cheltenham Borough Council in 1893. The building was designated as a Grade I listed building in 1955. During the 1960s the council and Lloyds Bank undertook restoration work.

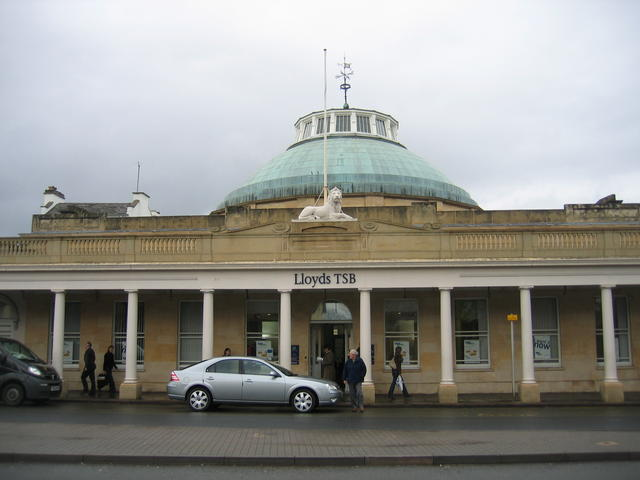
The Rotunda building when it housed a branch of Lloyds Bank

Since 2017 it has housed a restaurant in The Ivy collection, who undertook restoration work.

== Architecture ==
The building has limestone walls with a copper roof. The front of the building has a colonnade of doric columns, a frieze of alternating square and rectangular panels and a parapet. The central wooden dome in the assembly room is coffered internally and has light entering via the lantern in the centre. The room is 56 feet (17 m) high and 54 feet (16 m) across.
