= The Playhouse Company =

The Playhouse Company may refer to:

- Playhouse Arts, formerly The Playhouse Company, an amateur theatre company based at The Playhouse, Cheltenham
- The Playhouse Company (South Africa), a professional theatre company based at the Playhouse Theatre in Durban, South Africa
