= Cheltenham Minster, St Mary's =

Church in Gloucestershire, England

Coordinates: 51°54′5.65″N 2°4′34.64″W

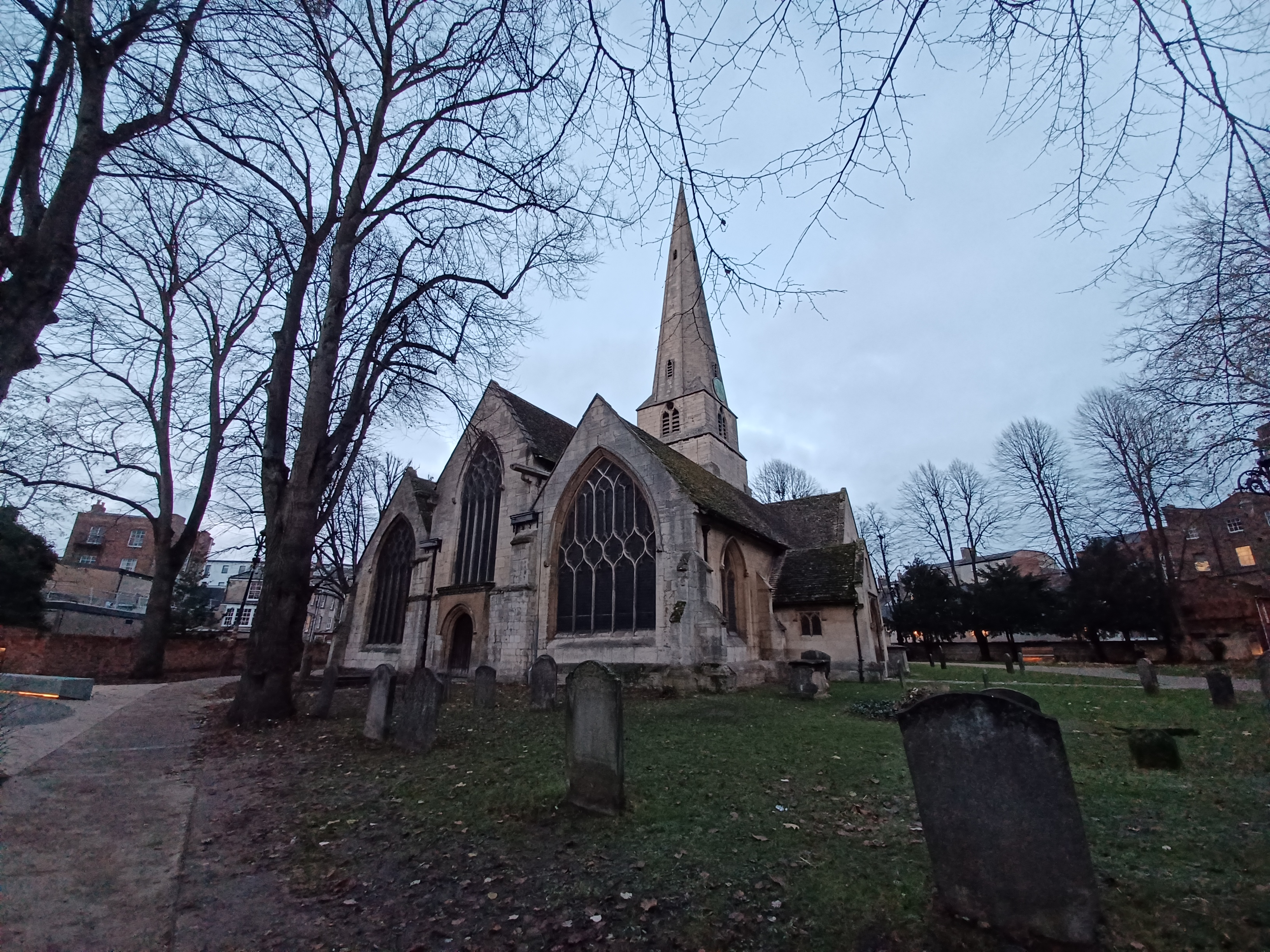
- Cheltenham Minster
- Cheltenham Minster, St Mary's
- Denomination: Church of England
- Previous denomination: Roman Catholic
- Churchmanship: Evangelical

History
- Dedication: St. Mary

Administration
- Province: Canterbury
- Diocese: Gloucester
- Archdeaconry: Cheltenham
- Deanery: Cheltenham
- Parish: Cheltenham St Mary with St Matthew

Clergy
- Bishop: Right Revd Rachel Treweek
- Rector: Rev Richard Coombs
- Vicar: Rev Richard Coombs

Cheltenham Minster is the minster and parish church of Cheltenham in Gloucestershire, England.

== Background ==
The Minster is the only surviving medieval building in Cheltenham. It has been in continuous use for 850 years, though between 1859 and 1877 it was closed intermittently for repairs.

It is believed to have replaced a Saxon church erected on this site in the 8th century. In the Domesday Book of 1086 the church and its land (the rectory) were recorded as belonging to William the Conqueror's chancellor, Regenbald also known as Reinbald, who then bequeathed it to Cirencester Abbey. After the Dissolution of the Monasteries by Henry VIII it became crown property during the English Reformation. The crown property was sold by James VI and I and went through a succession of different owners (lay rectors) until 1863 when Edward Walker took possession of the chancel and the title of rector.

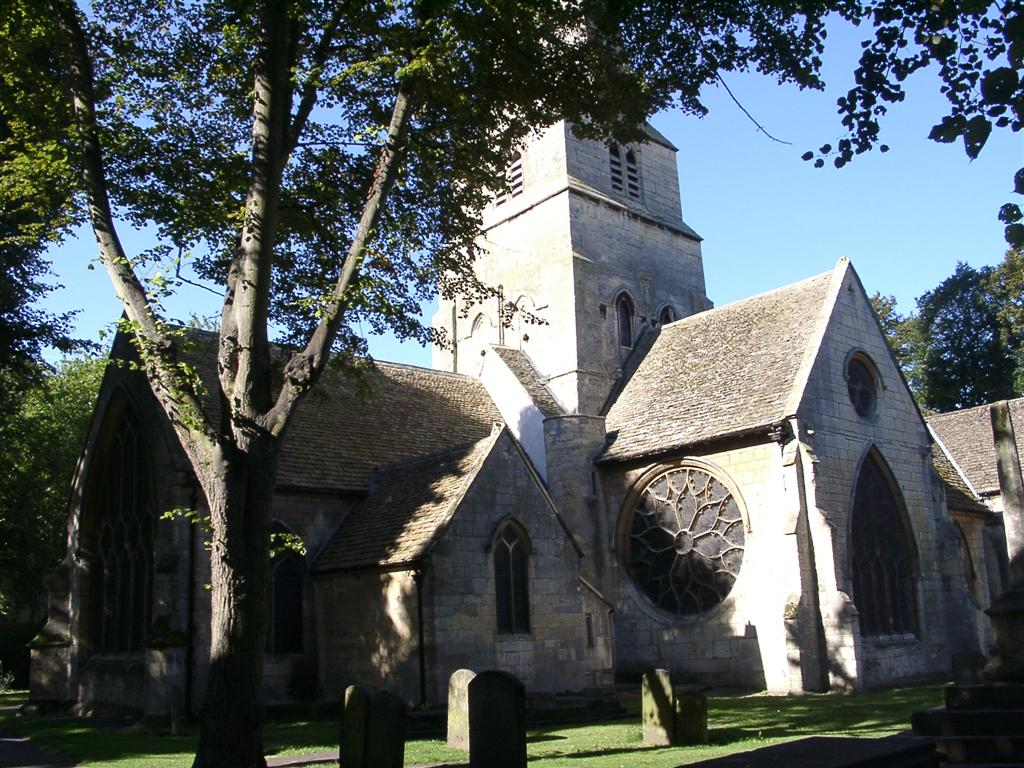
A view showing the Rose Window

Parts of the church represent the Early English style of architecture, but thanks to later extensions it is the decorated style which predominates. The former north porch is Early Perpendicular and boasts a good example of lierne vaulting. The tracery of the windows reflects architectural developments between 1250 and 1350. The stained glass of the windows is late Victorian and regarded as of particularly high quality. The woodwork is Victorian or later, and the south porch is a late Victorian addition.

A feature of the church is the spire and bell tower. The upper part of the tower dates from 1200 and the broach spire was added early in the fourteenth century. The tracery of most of the windows is varied and dates from around 1250 to 1350.

The bell tower currently contains a peal of twelve bells which were cast by John Taylor & Co in 2018 as part of a major restoration project. The original change ringing peal was probably installed around 1680, and contained six bells. The peal was augmented to eight in 1697 and to ten in 1833. Several record peals were rung on the ten bells, including a record length of 15,227 Grandsire Caters, taking in nine hours and 43 minutes, in 1889. Two new bells were added in 1912 to form the original ring of twelve.

The church has a number of memorials, including one to Captain Henry Skillicorne, the developer of Cheltenham's first spa. It also commemorates King George III's visit to Cheltenham in 1788 when he attended a number of services in St Mary's. There is also a memorial to a former priest, John English, who was imprisoned by the Puritans. The church is a Grade I listed building.

Its most famous incumbent was Francis Close, a keen Evangelical, who was a follower of Charles Simeon. Close was perpetual curate of the church for thirty years and a founder of two teacher training colleges which later became the University of Gloucestershire. He moved on to become Dean of Carlisle in 1856.

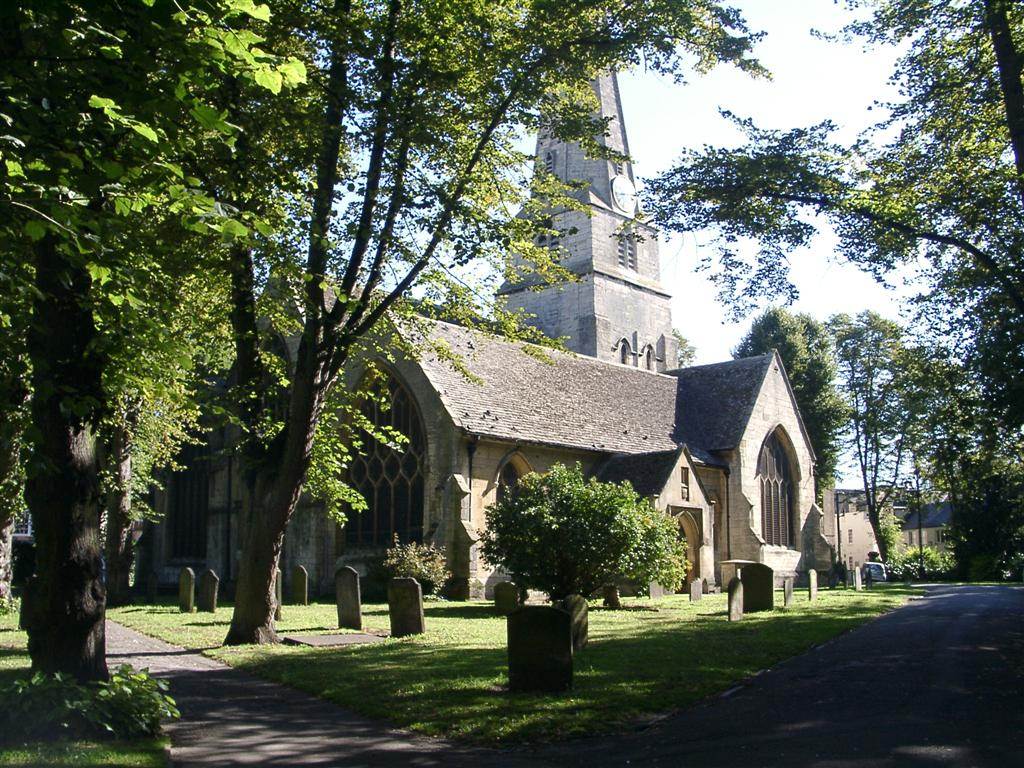
A view including the tower. The surrounding buildings make it awkward to get a fuller picture of the church.

For most of its history St Mary's Church served a population of less than 1,500 and was a prominent feature of the landscape. But extensive building occurred during the Regency period in the early 19th century and as a result the church is now hidden behind shops and offices. In Victorian times a number of new churches were built to cope with Cheltenham's rapidly expanding population.

== Two Churches? ==
St Mary's was condemned as unsafe and closed in July 1859. During the closure the congregation worshipped first in the Town Hall (the predecessor of Cheltenham's current Town Hall) and then in a temporary church built of timber encased with corrugated iron in Clarence Street.

In 1863 Edward Walker proposed the enlargement or replacement of St Mary's. Thirty-four plans were submitted, but because of opposition the proposal was abandoned and instead between 1851 and 1877 the church was restored by architects Dangerfield, Humphris, and Christian, and equipped with gas lighting and a new heating system.

The temporary building in Clarence Street was eventually replaced by a permanent stone building which was consecrated in 1879 as St Matthew's. The then rector, Charles Bell, applied to make St Matthew's the parish church, but the proposal was rejected by the parishioners.

In 1890 an entrance porch was built on the south side of the church and in 1911 the peal of bells was increased to twelve. Various minor changes were made to the layout of the church in the 20th century, notably a prayer chapel in the south transept. A further reordering took place in 2012 when the prayer chapel was moved to the north transept, the font was moved to the south entrance from the old north porch, toilets and other facilities were installed in the south transept, and some pews were removed to create space for the new prayer chapel, exhibitions and hospitality.

On Sunday 3 February 2013 St Mary's was designated Cheltenham Minster by Michael Perham, Bishop of Gloucester.

A group known as The Friends of St Mary's, Cheltenham raises funds for the upkeep of the church.
