= Weird fish =

Weird Fish may refer to:

- Weird Fish (clothing brand)
- "Weird Fishes / Arpeggi", a song by Radiohead from their album In Rainbows
- Diversity of fish
