= The Bacon Theatre, Cheltenham =

Theatre in Cheltenham, England

Coordinates: 51.8925°N 2.1060°W

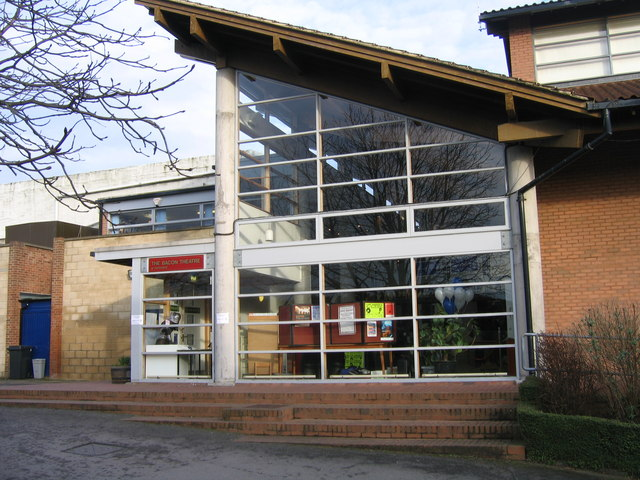
The Bacon Theatre

The Bacon Theatre is a medium-scale venue on the site of Dean Close School, Cheltenham. The theatre provides a teaching and leisure resource for the school as well as being available to hire for local community groups and providing a full programme of professional events.

== History ==
Originally named The New Theatre, the 566-seater venue was opened on 29 October 1991 by the Lord Lieutenant of Gloucestershire; Colonel Sir Martin Gibb . The architect, Richard Slawson, also designed the Edwards Building at Dean Close, consisting of a large dining room and classroom complex. Both buildings featured high sloping wooden roofs, unique at the time of building. The financing of the whole project, some £2 million, was partly funded from the sale of land; partly from careful housekeeping and partly by an appeal. Many local people, including staff and parents of Dean Close, donated sums or items towards the project. Notable donations include the Waterford chandelier hanging in the 'Orangery' (the theatre foyer), the marble floor and a Steinway concert grand piano. The 'Orangery' was named after the special orange trees originally grown in the space.

The first production to take place in the New Theatre was Twelfth Night by Dean Close scholars in November 1991. Directed by the head of English and Drama, Peter Cairns, the production continued an old school tradition by including two members of staff in the cast, Richard Taylor as Sir Toby Belch and Lloyd Allington as Malvolio.

Towards the end of 1994, the BBC's Any Questions? was broadcast from the New Theatre. The team comprised Baroness Shirley Williams, the Rt Hon. Tony Benn, MP, the Rt Hon. Michael Howard, MP, and Anne Atkins, journalist, broadcaster and a Dean Close parent. The show was hosted by Jonathan Dimbleby.

In 1998 the theatre took on the name of Dean Close's headmaster, Christopher Bacon on the occasion of his retirement.

== Usage ==
The theatre is equipped to present small and medium-scale theatre productions, live music, full-scale ballet and films. Performers such as the Ukulele Orchestra of Great Britain, Joe Pasquale, Derren Brown and Vienna Festival Ballet have appeared at the theatre in the recent past. The theatre is home to the Cheltenham Film Society who present a season of films between September and April each year. The theatre has hosted events for the Science, Literature and Music Festivals which form part of the Cheltenham Festivals. The theatre and other facilities onsite are home to the European String Teachers Association's summer school, The Cheltenham Recorder Festival, The Cheltenham Rock School and the World Youth Guitar Festival. A number of local community groups hire the Bacon Theatre including:

- CoadyCrew Dance Studios
- Corraine Collins Dance Studios
- Danceworks
- DeNovo Dance
- Friends of Cheltenham Art Gallery and Museum
- Gloucester Gang Show
- Gloucestershire Dance
- Gloucestershire Girl Guides
- Hatherley Dance Centre
- Holst Birthplace Museum
- Janet Marshall Dance Studios
- Mandy Godding Dance and Theatre Arts
- Promenade Productions
- Sally Prout School of Dance
- Stage Experience
- Stagecoach
- The Salvation Army

== Open-air Theatre Festival ==
The Bacon Theatre administrates the Open-air Theatre Festival at the Tuckwell Amphitheatre each year. The Tuckwell Amphitheatre is a stone-built open-air venue built in the 1930s, and is currently licensed to hold 300. The Open-air Theatre Festival was piloted in 2004 and is held over two weeks in July and August each year. Regular contributors include Miracle Theatre, Peter Gill, Jenny Wren Productions, Rain or Shine Theatre Company and The Pantaloons.
