= Fairview, Cheltenham =

Area of Cheltenham, England

Coordinates: 51.90182°N 2.06662°W

Fairview
- Country: England
- Sovereign state: United Kingdom

Fairview is an area of Cheltenham, Gloucestershire, England. Situated between the town centre and Pittville, it is largely residential. There are a couple of businesses, including a local builders merchant and Cheltenham builder's merchant, George Bence, and a branch of Machinemart.

According to maps in Cheltenham library, Fairview was part of an expansion of the town onto former farmland in the early nineteenth century. Much of its housing is a mix of late Regency and Victorian, with some more recent additions filling the gaps left by early developers. Another feature of the area is its narrow streets, planned well before the arrival of motor vehicles; parts of Fairview are difficult to navigate should the unfamiliar motorist stray from the larger streets.

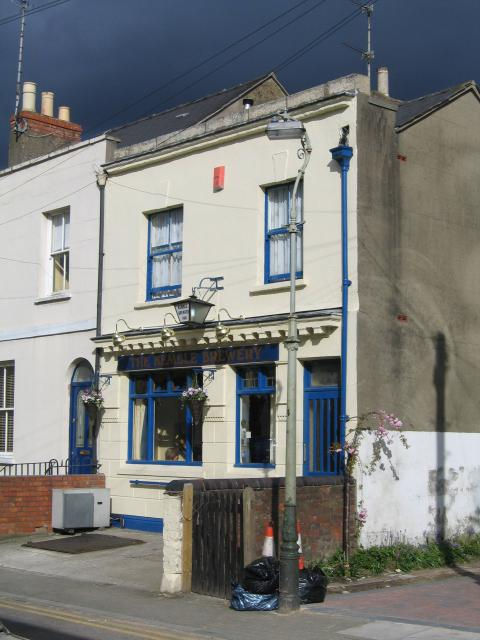
The Kemble Brewery Inn

== Local landmarks ==
The Kemble Brewery: archetypal Cheltenham back-street local pub.
