= No Atlas =

- Origin: Cheltenham, Gloucestershire, United Kingdom
- Genres: Alternative, Indie rock, Rock, Progressive indie
- Years active: 2013—2015
- Label: El Foreigners Music
- Members: Ollie Weikert – Vocals, Bass, Guitar, Piano; Bradley Hutchings – Guitar; Andy Burgess – Drums
- Past members: Thomas Muddle – Bass, Vocals; Toby Smallwood – Bass

No Atlas were an English progressive-indie band from Cheltenham, Gloucestershire, formed in 2013. The band consisted of Ollie Weikert (lead vocals, bass), Bradley Hutchings (guitar, backing vocals), Andy Burgess (drums, percussion).

No Atlas (originally called Metropolis) released their debut EP Where People Have Been in 2013 and their popularity rose in the United Kingdom with the release of their single, "I Don’t Wanna" (2013). No Atlas’ second EP, Reply and Reply (2014), propelled them to greater national exposure with consistent radio airplay from BBC Introducing, BBC 6 Music and Tone Radio.

Few indie came out of the Cheltenham music scene at the dawn of the 2013 and almost singularly helped create the progressive-indie movement.

In July 2015 it was announced they would be splitting but it is rumored they may reunite and begin touring again.

== History ==
Weikert, Hutchings and Burgess met as students on the Popular Music course at the University of Gloucestershire, and began playing under the name Metropolis. They first played live at Mosaic House, Prague, (Czech Republic), with stand-in bass player Toby Smallwood. After releasing their debut EP Where People Have Been the band continued to progress with radio airplay, national television interviews, and live sessions for the BBC and with new bass player (Thomas Muddle) the band began to play shows. Initially they played gigs at small Cheltenham venues such as The Frog and Fiddle, 2 Pigs and St Pauls Tavern but then later moved to playing venues in London and Bristol such as The Croft and Tooting Tram and Social. In late 2013, No Atlas supported Jim Lockey & The Solemn Sun on their sold-out homecoming show in Cheltenham. In early 2014, the band signed to El Foreigners Music, and released their second EP Reply and Reply which was received with positive critical acclaim by online music blogs such as Scatter Magazine and Don't Need No Melody. The band went on to successfully play shows as a three piece with Weikert as the bass player.

In July 2015, No Atlas announced via bandcamp they were splitting as a band, releasing demos from a planned future album, stating "Half of what was to be a possible future album, we unanimously decided to release the following songs and demos to say a massive thank you to what No Atlas was always about – the people who supported us". It has been rumoured that No Atlas will be reuniting and playing shows at Butlins.

Currently Burgess is doing session work, Weikert is writing music, Muddle is fronting D-I-Cry indie punk three-piece Homer Junior and Hutchings' whereabouts is unknown.

== Discography ==
- Where People Have Been [EP] (2013)
- "I Dont Wanna" [single] (2013)
- Reply and Reply [EP] (2014)
- No Atlas [EP] (2015)
