= Volo (company) =

Commerce technology provider

Volo Commerce
- Industry: Ecommerce Technology
- Founded: 2006
- Headquarters: Cheltenham, United Kingdom
- Key people: Sandy Scott (CEO); Tony Kyberd (COO); Chris Farrelly (Founder/CTO); Jennifer Reidel (CFO)
- Parent: FOG Software Group
- Website: volocommerce.com

Volo Commerce is an ecommerce technology provider with offices in Cheltenham. The company was privately owned and funded by venture capital investment firm, Notion Capital, until its acquisition by FOG Software Group in September 2019.

The company provides an intelligent platform which allows sellers to scale up their ecommerce business across multiple online channels including their own websites, Amazon and eBay. Their service also enables sellers to connect with other ecommerce platforms, shipping, payment and finance system providers. Volo was formerly known as eSellerPro.

== History ==
The company was founded in 2006 by Chris Farrelly and after significant growth rebranded in 2015. Other than its headquarters in Cheltenham, Volo opened its first London office in 2014. In 2017, the business secured a funding round of £6.2 million led by NVM Private Equity with participation from funds managed by Downing LLP. The company subsequently rebranded to volo.ai. On 4 September 2019, FOG Software Group acquired the Volo Origin platform and staff from volo.ai and the business name reverted to Volo Commerce. volo.ai continued its operations out of the London office as a separate company before itself rebranding to upp.ai.
