= Swindon Village =

Village in Gloucestershire, England

Coordinates: 51.922565°N 2.095357°W

Swindon
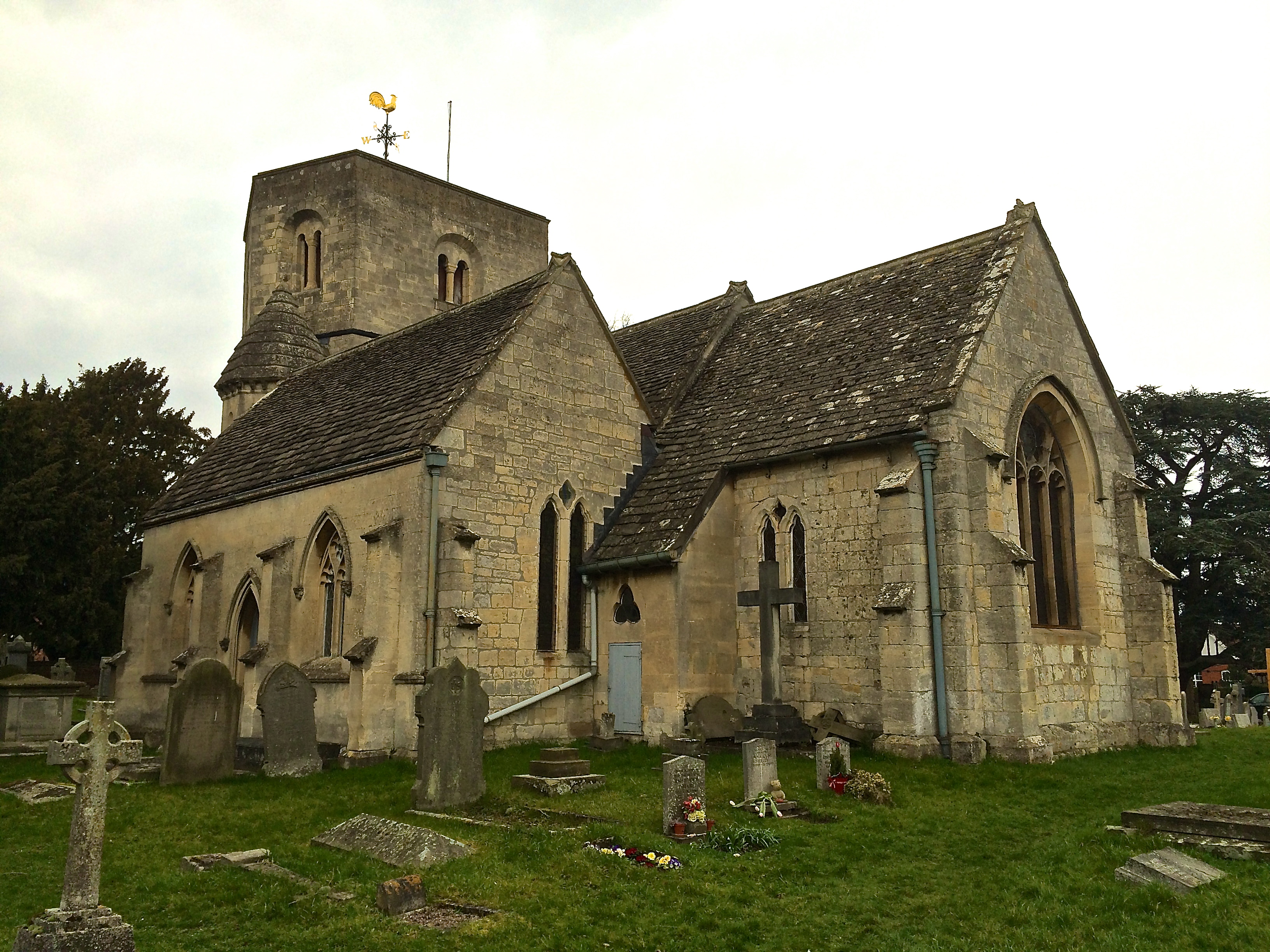
- St Lawrence Church, Swindon

- Location within Gloucestershire
- Population: 1,778
- OS grid reference: SO935248
- Civil parish: Swindon
- District: Cheltenham
- Shire county: Gloucestershire
- Region: South West
- Country: England
- Sovereign state: United Kingdom
- Post town: Cheltenham
- Postcode district: GL51
- Police: Gloucestershire
- Fire: Gloucestershire
- Ambulance: South Western
- UK Parliament: Tewkesbury

Swindon or Swindon Village is both a village and a suburb in the spa town of Cheltenham, in the Cheltenham district, in the county of Gloucestershire, England. It is located northwest of Arle.

The Swindon parish had a population of 1,778 according to the 2011 census.

== Landmarks ==
- A park and playing field, which includes football pitches, a cricket pitch and two pavilions.
- The Church of St Lawrence, which is in the centre of the village. The church dates from the 12th Century. Its bell tower has six unequally sized walls.
- The Village Hall, which contains a hall with a performance stage, a side room and a licensed bar, all of which are used for private and community.
- Swindon Village Primary School.
- Seasons Business and Leisure Complex (previously the Zurich Financial Services sports and social club and originally the Eagle Star Sports and Social Club), and used for training by Cheltenham Town Football Club.
