= Cheltenham =

Town and Borough in Gloucestershire, England

Cheltenham Cheltenham
- Town and borough
- Cheltenham Spa
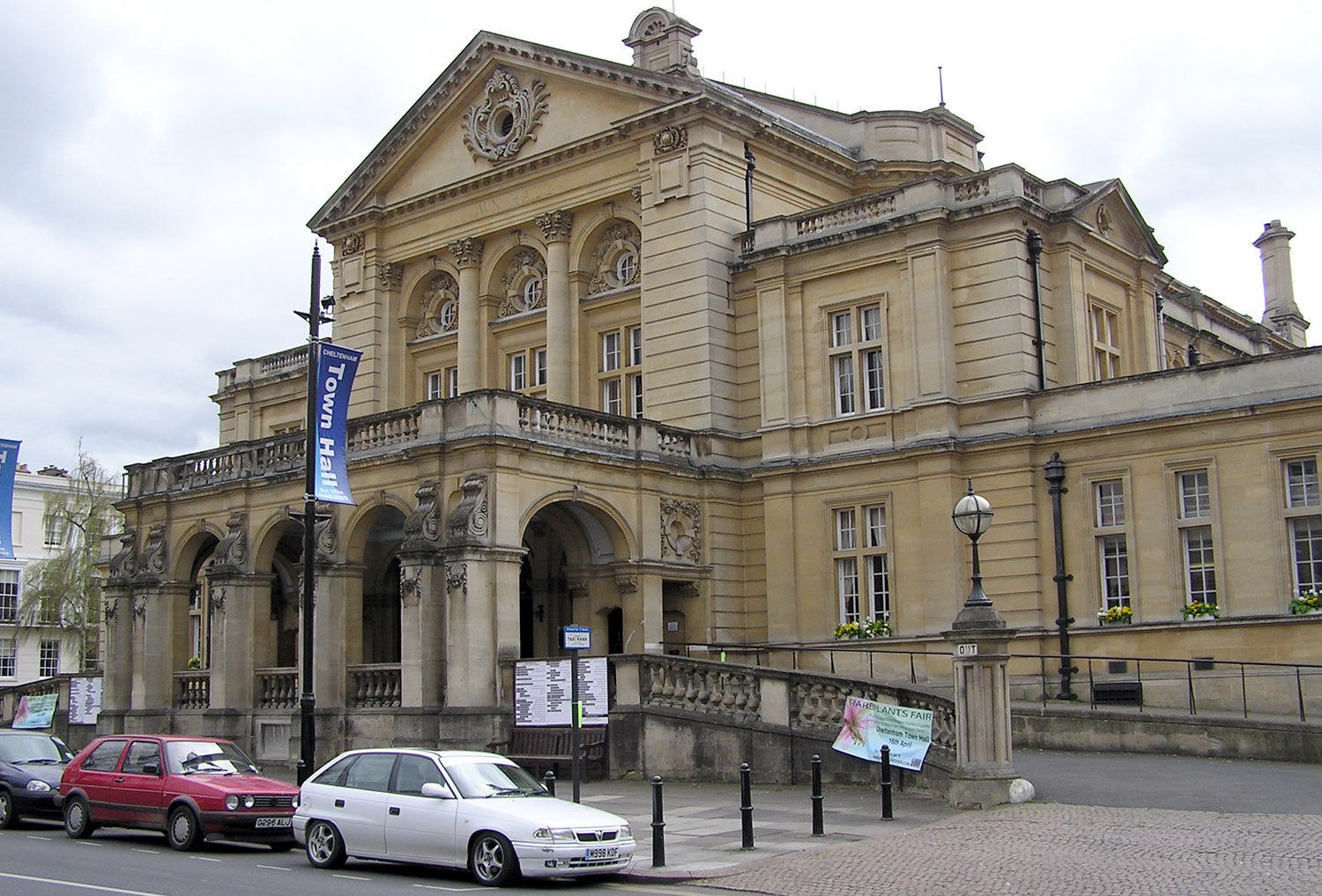
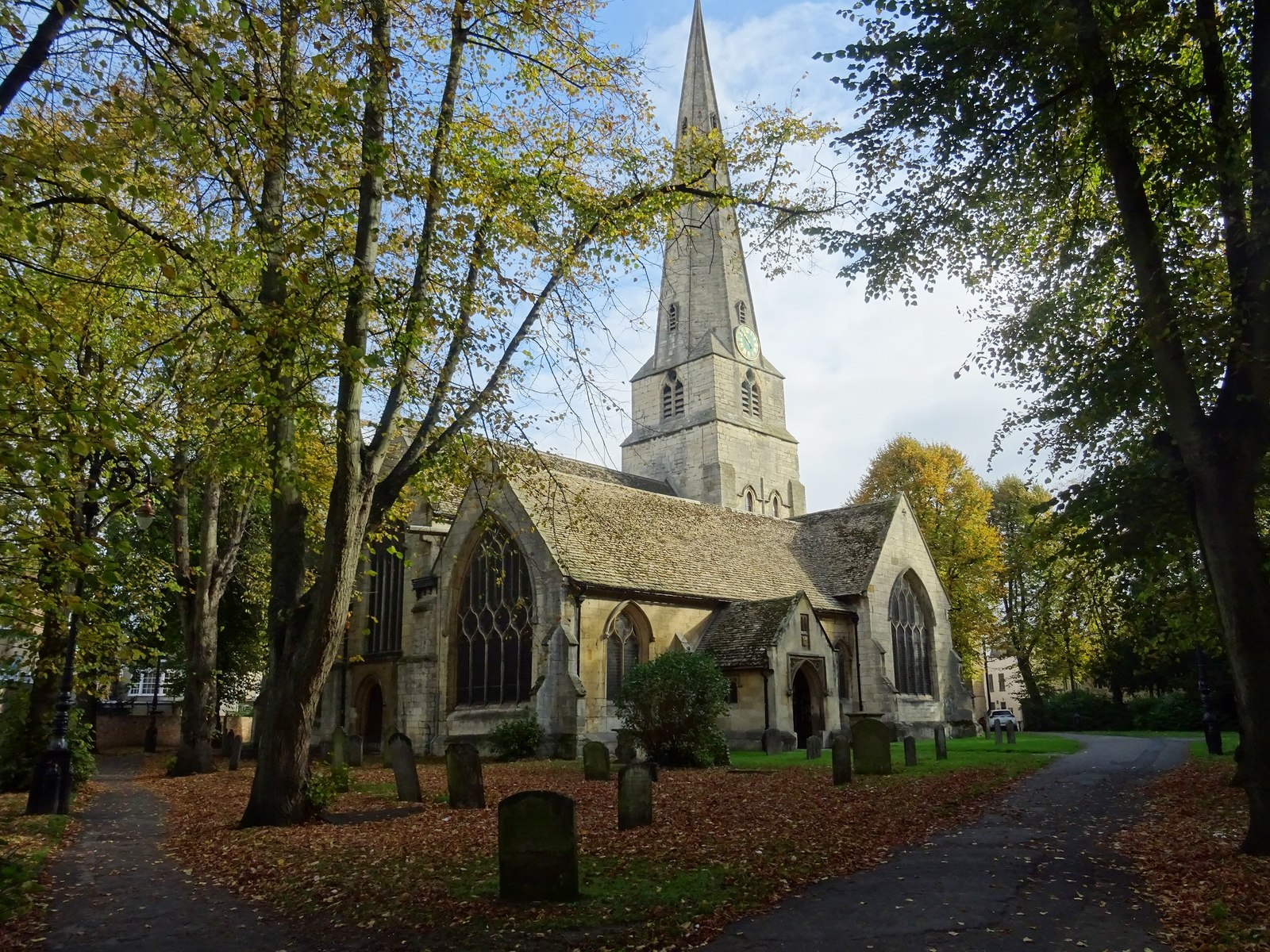
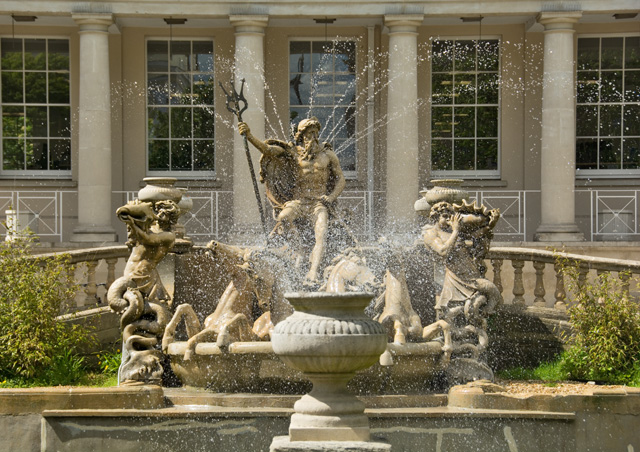
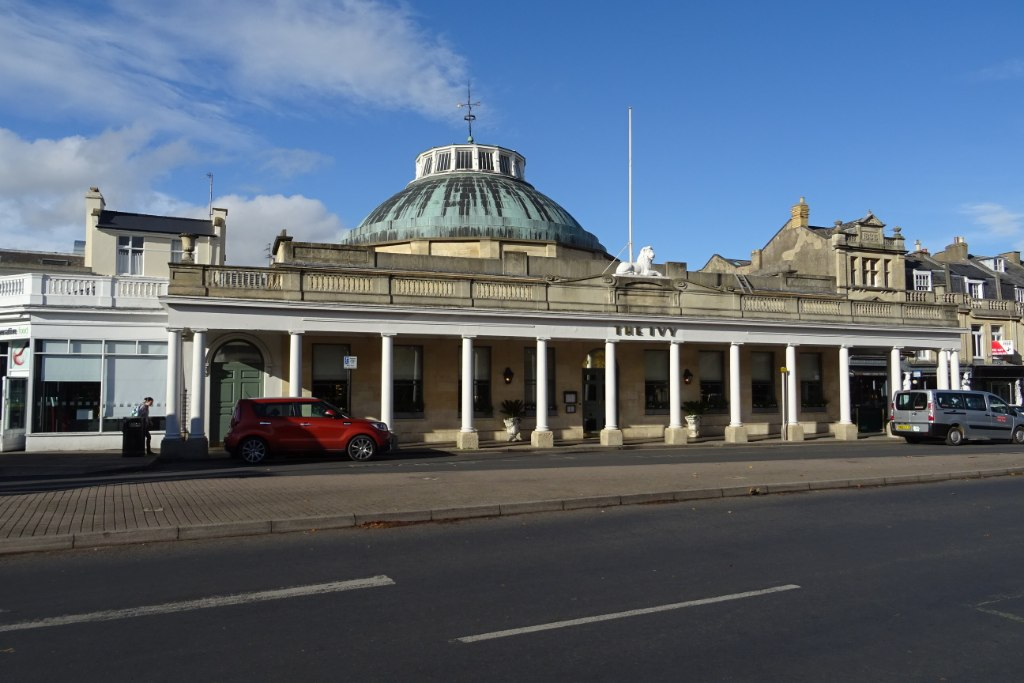
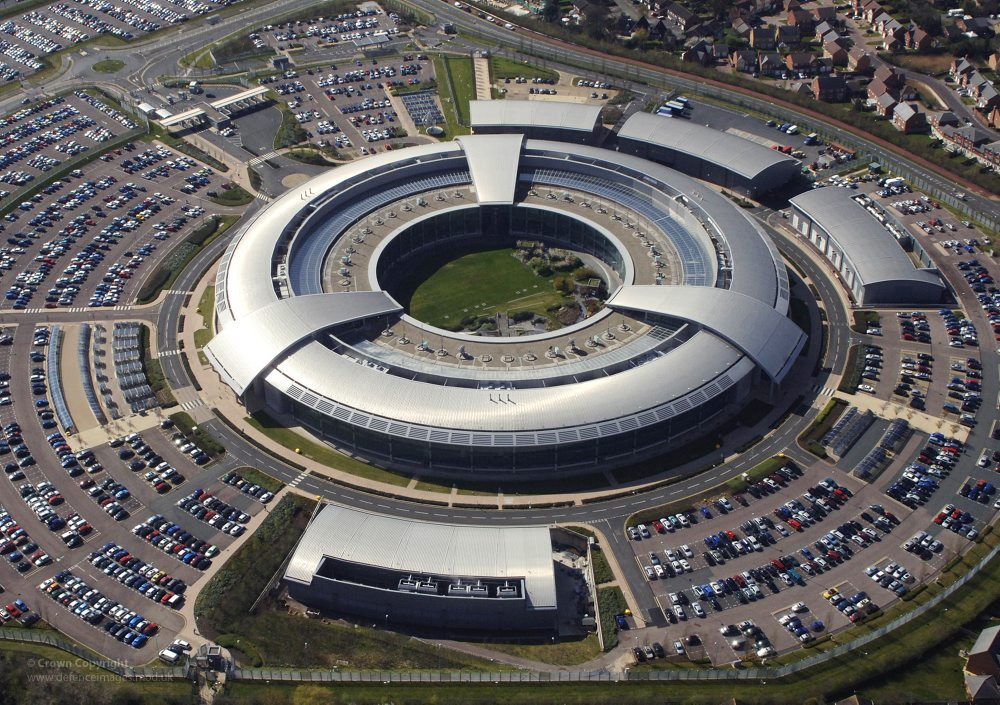
- The Town Hall Cheltenham Minster Neptune Fountain Montpellier Rotunda Aerial of Cheltenham and the GCHQ

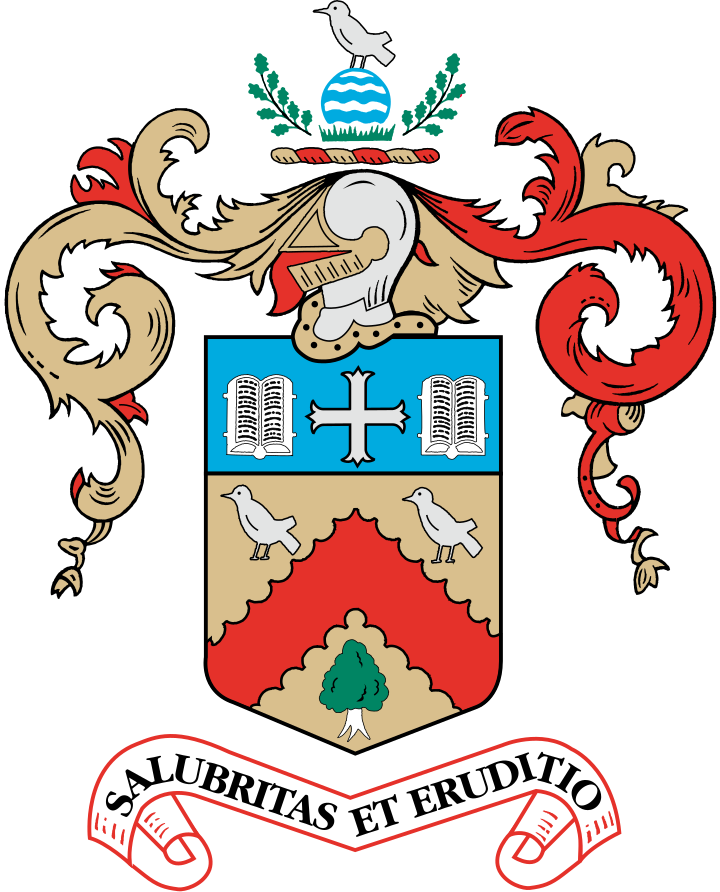
- Coat of arms
- Motto(s): Salubritas et Eruditio ("Health and Education")
- Cheltenham within Gloucestershire
- Coordinates: 51°54′N 2°4′W
- Country: United Kingdom
- Constituent country: England
- Region: South West England
- Ceremonial county: Gloucestershire
- Borough: Cheltenham

Government
  - Governing body: Cheltenham Borough Council
  - Leadership: Leader & Cabinet
  - Executive: Liberal Democrat
  - MP: Max Wilkinson (Liberal Democrats)

Area
  - Borough: 18.00 sq mi (46.61 km^{2})
  - Rank: Ranked 247th

Population (2021 census)
  - Borough: 118,836
  - Rank: Ranked 205th
  - Density: 6,750/sq mi (2,607/km^{2})
- Demonyms: Cheltonian

Ethnicity (2021)
  - Ethnic groups: List: 91.4% White; 4.1% Asian; 2.5% Mixed; 1% other; 1% Black

Religion (2021)
  - Religion: List: 45.5% Christianity; 44.4% no religion; 8.6% other; 1.5% Islam
- Postcode: GL50, GL51, GL52, GL53, GL54
- Area code: 01242
- OS grid reference: SO945225
- Website: cheltenham.gov.uk

Cheltenham (/ˈtʃɛltənəm/ CHELT-ən-əm) is a historic spa town and borough adjacent to the Cotswolds in Gloucestershire, England. Cheltenham became known as a health and holiday spa town resort following the discovery of mineral springs in 1716, and claims to be the most complete Regency town in Britain. It is directly northeast of Gloucester.

The town hosts several cultural festivals, often featuring nationally and internationally famous contributors and attendees: the Cheltenham Literature Festival, the Cheltenham Jazz Festival, the Cheltenham Science Festival, the Cheltenham Music Festival, the Cheltenham International Film Festival, the Cheltenham Cricket Festival and the Cheltenham Food & Drink Festival. In steeplechase horse racing, the Gold Cup is the main event of the Cheltenham Festival held every March. It is also home to a number of leading independent schools, including Cheltenham College and Cheltenham Ladies' College.

== History ==
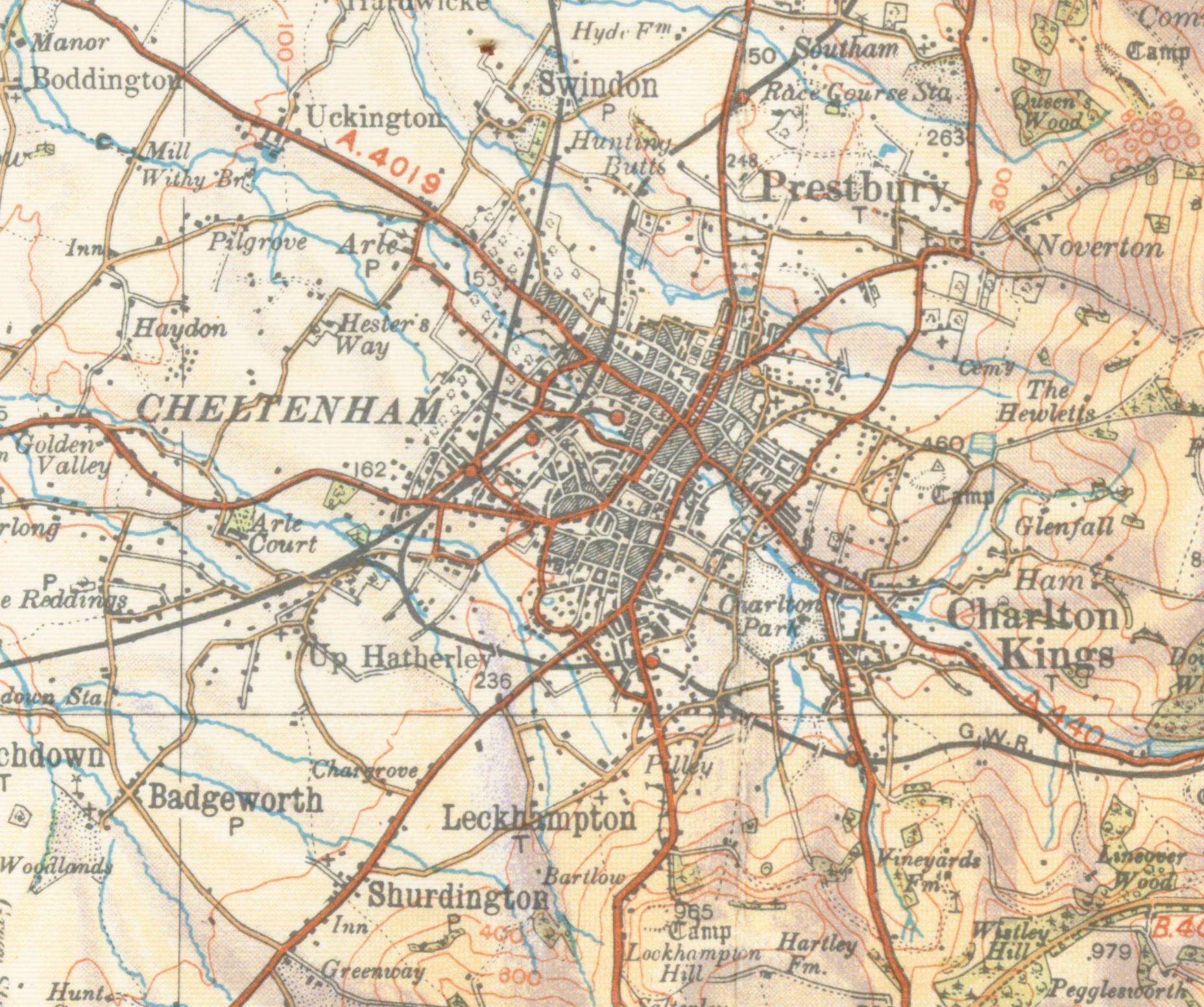
Cheltenham in 1933

Cheltenham is located at River Chelt, which rises nearby at Dowdeswell and runs through the town on its way to the Severn. It was first recorded in 803, as Celtan hom; the meaning has not been resolved with certainty, but latest scholarship concludes that the first element preserves a Celtic noun cilta, 'steep hill', here referring to the Cotswold scarp; the second element may mean 'settlement' or 'water-meadow'. As a royal manor, it features in the earliest pages of the Gloucestershire section of Domesday Book where it is named Chintenha[m]. The town was awarded a market charter in 1226.

Though little remains of its pre-spa history, Cheltenham has always been a health and holiday spa town resort since the discovery of mineral springs there in 1716. Captain Henry Skillicorne (1678–1763), is credited with being the first entrepreneur to recognise the opportunity to exploit the mineral springs. The retired "master mariner" became co-owner of the property containing Cheltenham's first mineral spring upon his 1732 marriage to Elizabeth Mason. Her father, William Mason, had done little in his lifetime to promote the healing properties of the mineral water apart from limited advertising and building a small enclosure over the spring. Skillicorne's wide travels as a merchant had prepared him to see the dormant potential on this inherited property. After moving to Cheltenham in 1738, he immediately began improvements intended to attract visitors to his spa. He built a pump to regulate water flow and erected an elaborate well-house complete with a ballroom and upstairs billiard room to entertain his customers. The beginnings of Cheltenham's tree-lined promenades and the gardens surrounding its spas were first designed by Captain Skillicorne with the help of "wealthy and travelled" friends who understood the value of relaxing avenues. The area's walks and gardens had views of the countryside, and soon the gentry and nobility from across the county were enticed to come and investigate the beneficial waters of Cheltenham's market town spa.

In 1795, Captain Powell Snell raised the First Troop of Gloucestershire Gentleman and Yeomanry (Royal Gloucestershire Hussars) at the Plough Inn (now Regent Arcade) in Cheltenham.

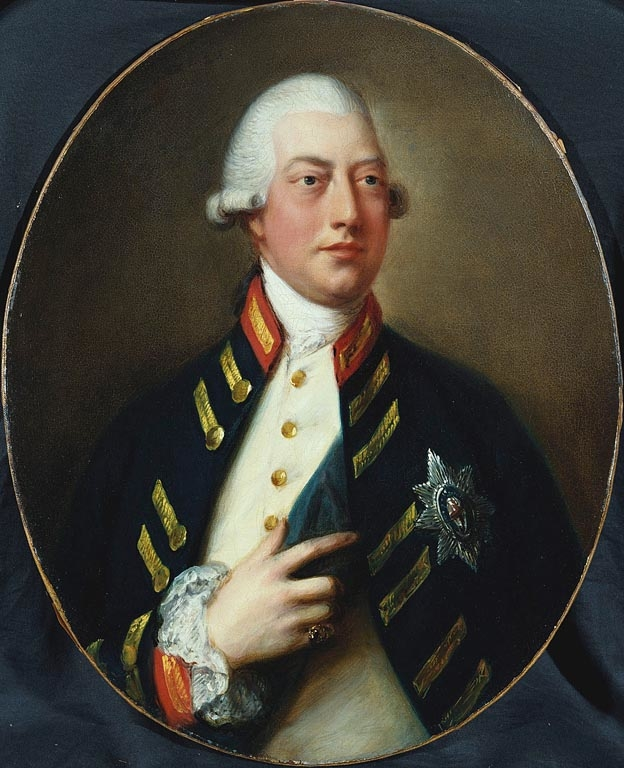
King George III in the 1780s

The visit of George III with the queen and royal princesses in 1788 set a stamp of fashion on the spa. The spa waters can still be sampled at the Pittville Pump Room, built for this purpose and completed in 1830; it is a centrepiece of Pittville, a planned extension of Cheltenham to the north, undertaken by Joseph Pitt, who laid the first stone on 4 May 1825.

Cheltenham's success as a spa town is reflected in the railway station, still called Cheltenham Spa, and spa facilities in other towns inspired by or named after it.

Alice Liddell and Lewis Carroll were regular visitors to a house in Cudnall Street, Charlton Kings – a suburb of Cheltenham. Alice Liddell's grandparents owned this house, and it still contains the mirror, or looking glass, that was purportedly the inspiration for Lewis Carroll's novel Through the Looking-Glass, published in 1871.

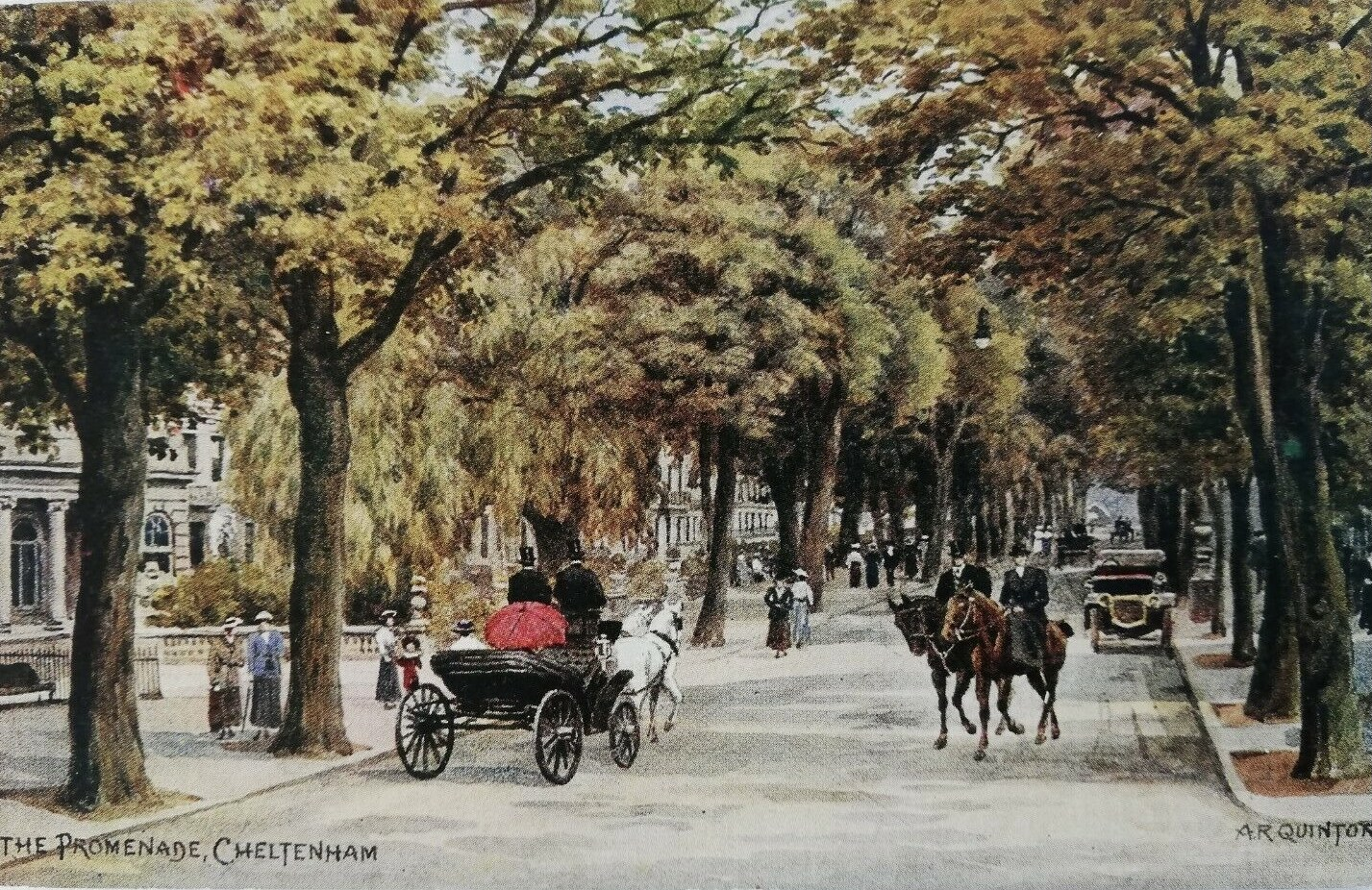
The Promenade, Cheltenham (postcard 1918) by A. R. Quinton

Horse racing began in Cheltenham in 1815 and became a major national attraction after the establishment of the Festival in 1902. The racecourse attracts tens of thousands of visitors to each day of the festival each year, with such large numbers of visitors having a significant impact on the town.

In the Second World War, the United States Army Services of Supply, European Theatre of Operations established its primary headquarters at Cheltenham under the direction of Lt. Gen. John C. H. Lee, with the flats of the Cheltenham Racecourse becoming a giant storage depot for countless trucks, jeeps, tanks and artillery pieces. Most of this material was reshipped to the continent for and after the D-Day invasion. Lee and his primary staff had offices and took residence at Thirlestaine Hall in Cheltenham.

The first British jet aircraft prototype, the Gloster E.28/39, was manufactured in Cheltenham. Manufacturing started in Hucclecote near Gloucester, but was later moved to Regent Motors in Cheltenham High Street (now the Regent Arcade), considered a location safer from bombing during the Second World War.

== Geography ==
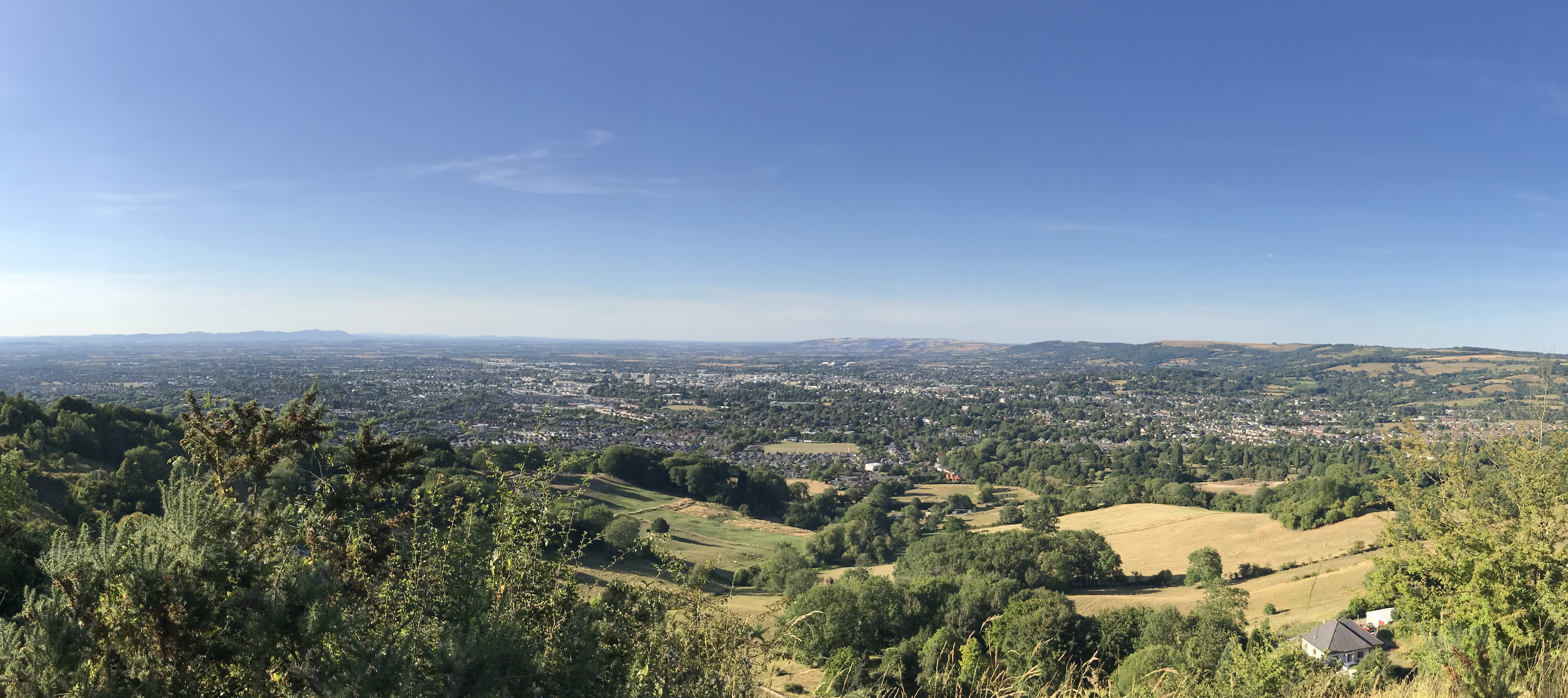
A view of Cheltenham from the hills

Cheltenham is situated just inside the edge of the Cotswolds, an Area of Outstanding Natural Beauty in the South-West region of England. The small River Chelt flows under and through the town.

Cleeve Hill, overlooks the town and is the highest point in the county of Gloucestershire and the Cotswold Hills range, at 1,083 feet (330 m).

The town is near the northeastern edge of the South West of England region being 88 miles (142 km) west-northwest of London, 38 miles (61 km) northeast of Bristol and 42 miles (67.5 km) south of Birmingham.

=== Neighbourhoods ===
The districts of Cheltenham include: Arle, Benhall, Charlton Kings, Fairview, Fiddler's Green, Hesters Way, Lansdown, Leckhampton, Lynworth, Montpellier, Oakley, Pittville, Prestbury, the Reddings, Rowanfield, St Luke's, St Mark's, St Paul's, St Peter's, Springbank, Swindon Village, Tivoli, Up Hatherley, Whaddon and Wyman's Brook.

The borough contains 5 civil parishes within its boundaries. These are Charlton Kings, Leckhampton with Warden Hill, Prestbury, Swindon and Up Hatherley. These all have their own parish councils who handle local services and planning with elected councillors.

=== Green belt ===
Parts of the town has green belt along its fringes, and this extends into the surrounding Tewkesbury district, helping to maintain local green space, prevent further urban sprawl and unplanned expansion towards Gloucester and Bishop's Cleeve, as well as protecting smaller villages in between. West of the Greenfield Way and Fiddlers Green Lane roads, along with much of the open space up to the Civil Service Sports Ground, as well as the Cheltenham Racecourse and surrounding green park, along with St Peter Leckhampton parish church and Brizen Playing Fields/Haven and Greenmead parks along the south of the borough, are covered.

== Potential merger of Cheltenham and Gloucester ==
In May 2024, under plans by Gloucestershire County Council, it was reported that there are secret talks to formally merge the conurbations of Cheltenham and Gloucester with each other. The plans suggest that around ten new garden towns could be built around the green belt at Boddington which if removed would result in the complete merger of both boroughs. Doing so would facilitate and effectively merge the two into a supercity. The move has been criticised by both Cheltenham Borough Council and Gloucester City Council.

== Government ==
Cheltenham Borough Council is the local authority for Cheltenham; it is split into 20 wards, with a total of 40 councillors elected to serve on the borough council. Since 2002, elections have been held every two years with half of the councillors elected at each election.

=== Administrative history ===
Cheltenham was an ancient parish. Until 1786 it was administered by its vestry, in the same way as most rural areas. The vestry was supplemented by a body of unelected improvement commissioners in 1786 known as the Paving and Lighting Commission, initially charged with paving, lighting and repairing the streets, which later gained other powers including providing a watch and setting standards for new buildings. The commissioners were reformed in 1852 to be partly-elected and were eventually replaced in 1876 when the town was incorporated as a municipal borough.

On 1 April 1974, under the Local Government Act 1972, the borough of Cheltenham was merged with Charlton Kings urban district to form the non-metropolitan district of Cheltenham. Four parishes—Swindon Village, Up Hatherley, Leckhampton and Prestbury—were added to the borough of Cheltenham from the borough of Tewkesbury in 1991.

=== GCHQ ===
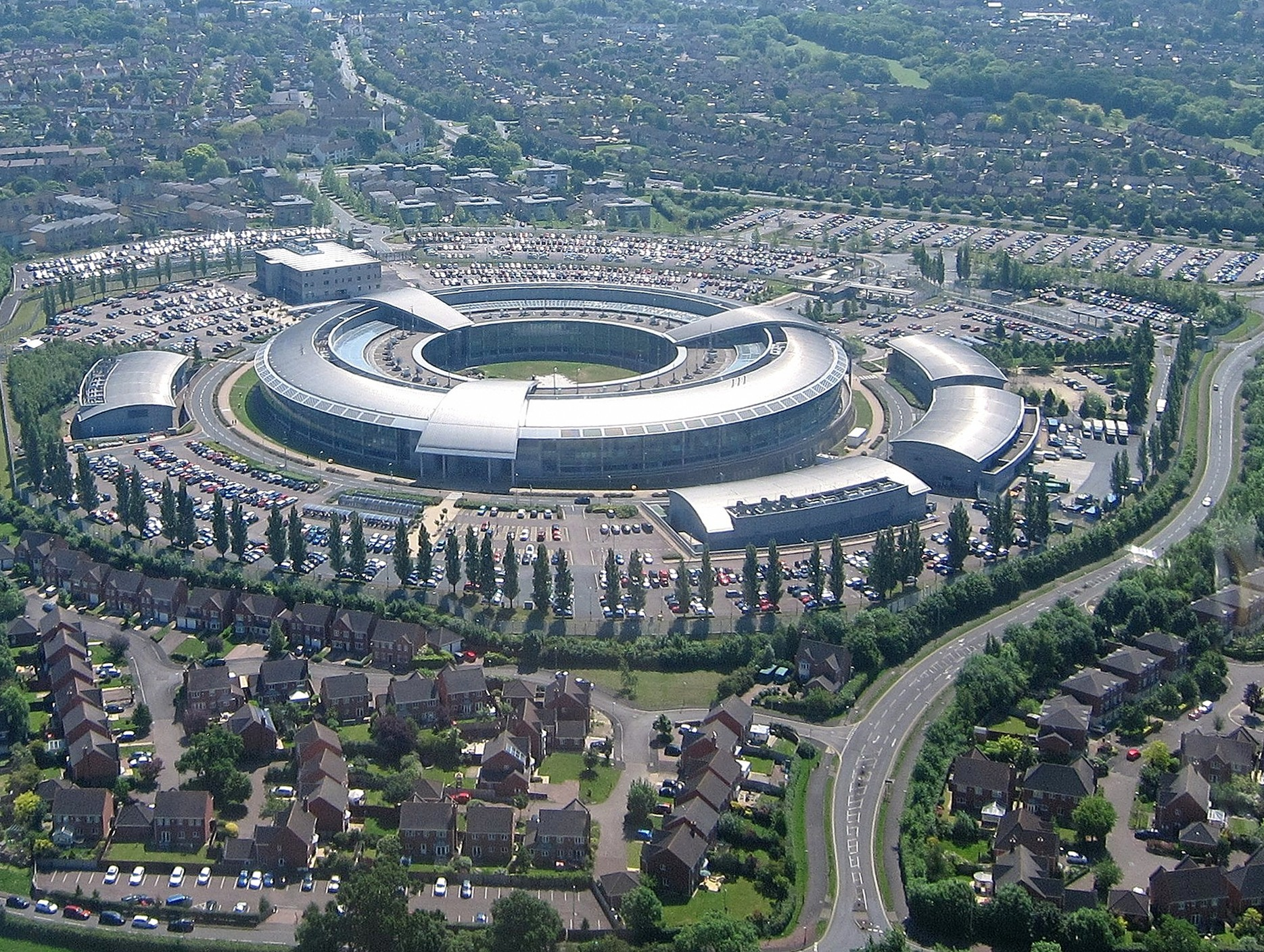
Government Communications Headquarters' head office (2017)

The head office of the British Government Communications Headquarters (GCHQ) is located in Cheltenham, to which it moved in 1951.

== Climate ==
As with the vast majority of the British Isles, Cheltenham experiences a temperate oceanic climate (Cfb in the Köppen climate classification). It has warm summers and cool winters. The town held the British maximum temperature record from 1990 to 2003—temperatures reached 98.8 °F (37.1 °C). The absolute minimum is −4.2 °F (−20.1 °C), set during December 1981. During a typical year, 139 days will report at least 1 mm of rain, and some 35.5 nights will record air frost.

Climate data for Cheltenham (1991–2020 normals, extremes 1889–2001)
Month	Jan	Feb	Mar	Apr	May	Jun	Jul	Aug	Sep	Oct	Nov	Dec	Year
Record high °C (°F)	15.0 (59.0)	18.0 (64.4)	22.2 (72.0)	26.7 (80.1)	29.4 (84.9)	34.6 (94.3)	35.9 (96.6)	37.1 (98.8)	32.6 (90.7)	26.7 (80.1)	17.5 (63.5)	16.2 (61.2)	37.1 (98.8)
Mean daily maximum °C (°F)	8.0 (46.4)	8.6 (47.5)	11.3 (52.3)	14.6 (58.3)	18.1 (64.6)	20.8 (69.4)	23.2 (73.8)	22.2 (72.0)	19.5 (67.1)	15.1 (59.2)	11.0 (51.8)	8.5 (47.3)	15.1 (59.2)
Daily mean °C (°F)	5.2 (41.4)	5.5 (41.9)	7.5 (45.5)	9.9 (49.8)	13.2 (55.8)	15.9 (60.6)	18.3 (64.9)	17.7 (63.9)	15.0 (59.0)	11.5 (52.7)	8.0 (46.4)	5.5 (41.9)	11.1 (52.0)
Mean daily minimum °C (°F)	2.3 (36.1)	2.3 (36.1)	3.6 (38.5)	5.1 (41.2)	8.2 (46.8)	11.0 (51.8)	13.4 (56.1)	13.2 (55.8)	10.5 (50.9)	7.9 (46.2)	4.9 (40.8)	2.4 (36.3)	7.1 (44.8)
Record low °C (°F)	−20.1 (−4.2)	−13.9 (7.0)	−11.7 (10.9)	−6.1 (21.0)	−3.3 (26.1)	−0.3 (31.5)	2.8 (37.0)	1.6 (34.9)	−0.8 (30.6)	−6.1 (21.0)	−8.6 (16.5)	−13.1 (8.4)	−20.1 (−4.2)
Average precipitation mm (inches)	78.0 (3.07)	65.8 (2.59)	51.3 (2.02)	69.2 (2.72)	65.5 (2.58)	71.3 (2.81)	70.4 (2.77)	72.3 (2.85)	69.2 (2.72)	80.5 (3.17)	88.8 (3.50)	84.8 (3.34)	867.2 (34.14)
Average precipitation days (≥ 1.0 mm)	12.8	11.0	10.7	11.4	11.0	10.5	10.7	11.2	10.2	12.6	13.7	13.4	139.0
Mean monthly sunshine hours	56.9	80.0	116.1	158.6	195.0	189.4	200.6	181.2	141.4	106.5	64.3	52.8	1,542.8
Source 1: Met Office
Source 2: Starlings Roost Weather

== Economy ==
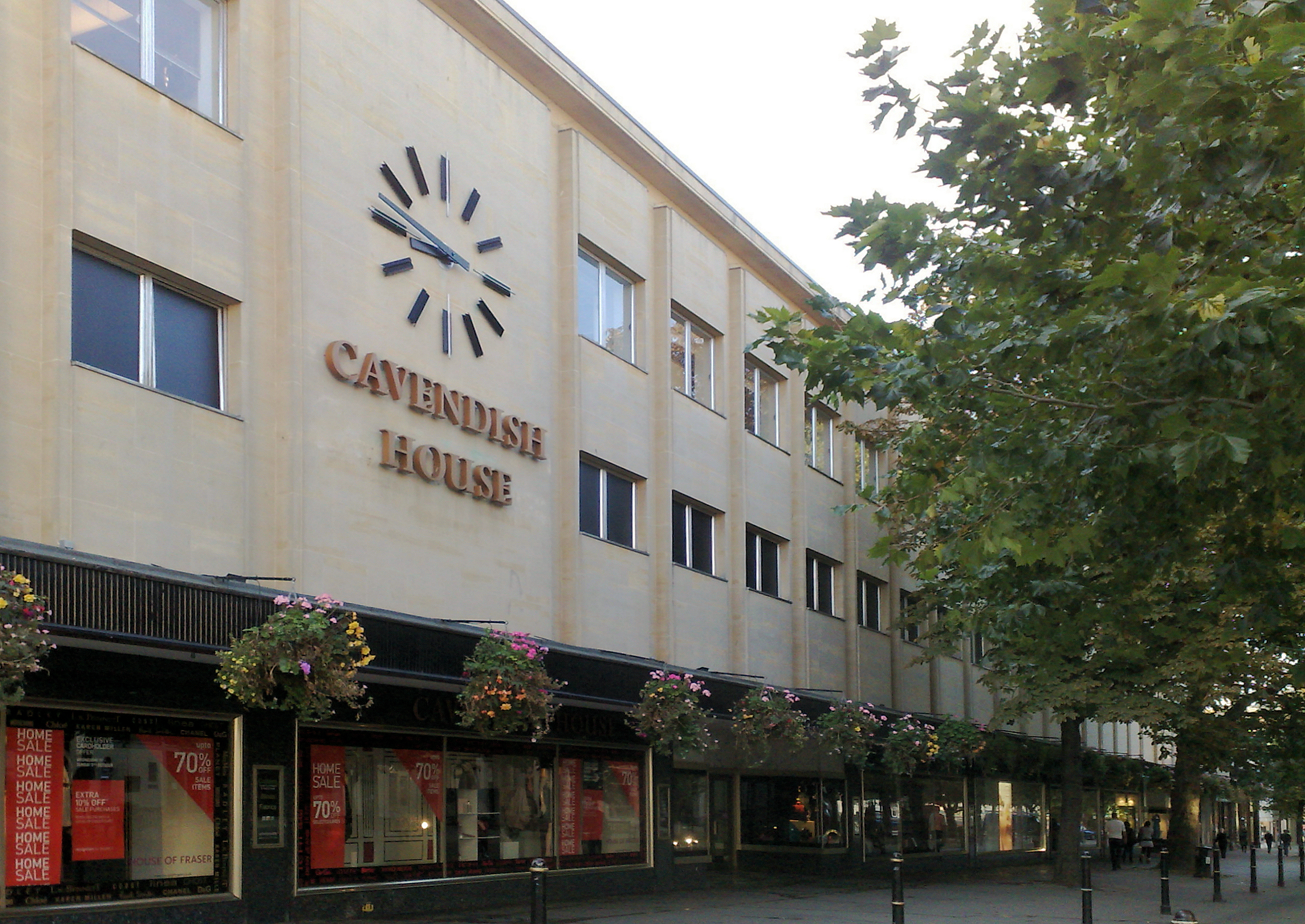
Cavendish House department store on the Promenade (October 2008)

As a Regency spa town, tourism is an important sector in Cheltenham's economy, but it also has some light industry, including food processing, aerospace and electronics businesses. The Government's electronic surveillance operation Government Communications Headquarters (GCHQ), known for its "doughnut-shaped" building, is in Cheltenham. Vertex Data Science, GE-Aviation, Chelsea Building Society, Endsleigh Insurance, Archant, Nelson Thornes, UCAS (Universities & Colleges Admissions Service), Kohler Mira, Zürich Financial Services, Douglas Equipment, Volo and Spirax-Sarco Engineering all have sites in and around Cheltenham.

A number of design agencies and businesses are located in the town. Weird Fish and Superdry were both founded in Cheltenham, and Superdry plc is still based there. The multinational design house Meri Meri has its European headquarters in Cheltenham.

Cheltenham is a regional shopping centre, home to department stores, the oldest being Cavendish House, from 1823, and the Regent Arcade. Since 2006, Cheltenham is the headquarters of "The Movie Booth", a company that owns and operates DVD rental kiosks.

The Beechwood Shopping Centre in the town centre was demolished in 2017 to make way for a £30million, 115,000 square foot John Lewis store.

Among Cheltenham's many restaurants, two are currently Michelin one-star restaurants, Le Champignon Sauvage and Lumière.

=== Employment and salary ===
The unemployment rate in Cheltenham was 2.7% in 2010 compared to the UK national unemployment level of 7.9%. The average GVA per head in Cheltenham was £21,947.27 in 2011 compared to the national average of £26,200.

In 2012, The Guardian found that, at the end of 2011, 41 multi-millionaires lived in Cheltenham, which was the fourth-highest rate in the UK of multi-millionaires per 100,000 people at 35.44.

According to the Office of National Statistics, employment in Cheltenham has decreased in comparison with the previous year. Cheltenham's employment rate was higher than across the South West as a whole in the year ending September 2023. The employment rate remains now at 81.3%, for ages 16–64. Unemployment (people looking for work) has risen since a year earlier. The most recent unemployment rate for Cheltenham was about the same as across the South West as a whole.

== Culture ==
Architecture

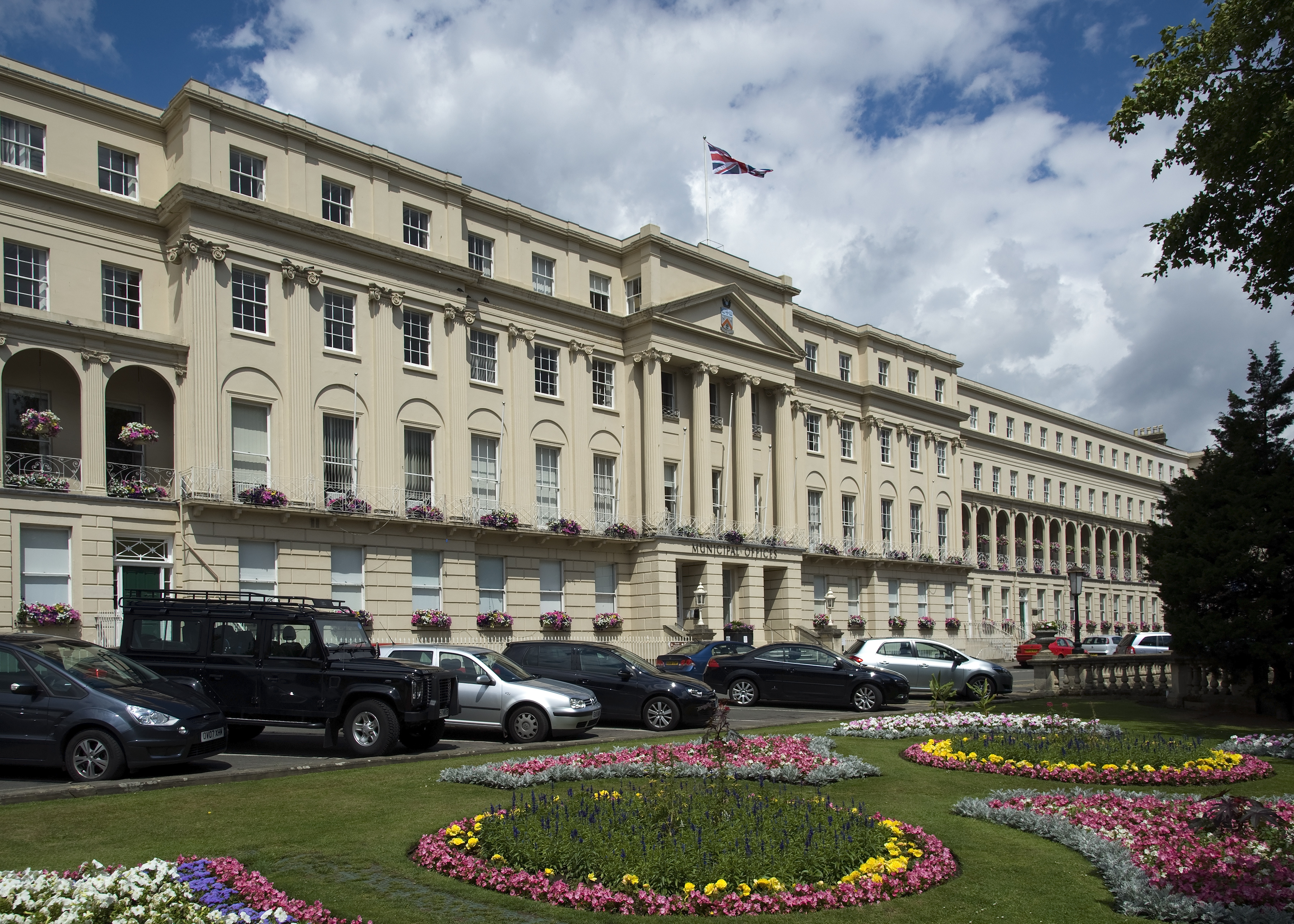
Cheltenham's Municipal Offices, an example of Regency architecture.

The town is known for its Regency architecture and is said to be "the most complete regency town in England". Many of the buildings are listed, including the Cheltenham Synagogue, judged by Nikolaus Pevsner to be one of the architecturally best non-Anglican places of worship in Britain.

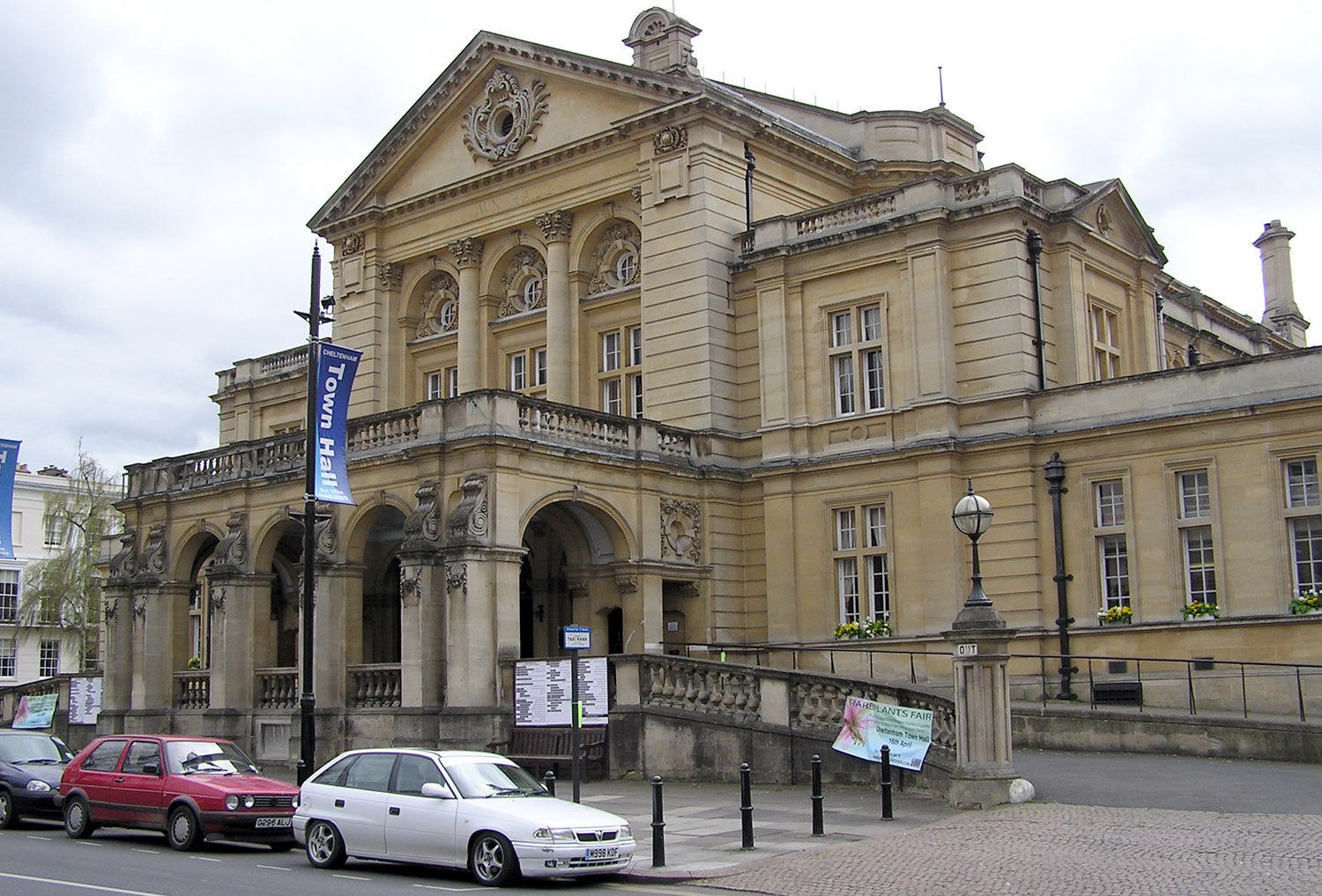
Cheltenham Town Hall erected in 1902 commemorate the coronation of King Edward VII and Queen Alexandra

Built in 1902 within the Imperial Square, Cheltenham Town Hall is a Grade II-listed building and features a plaque commemorating the coronation of King Edward VII and Queen Alexandra.

Art

The Cheltenham Art Gallery & Museum, also called The Wilson, hosts a programme of art exhibitions running throughout the year. The Wilson was named after polar explorer Edward Wilson, who was born in Cheltenham.

In 2014, many of the town's historic cultural and leisure buildings were put under the control of The Cheltenham Trust, a charity set up to manage and develop the buildings on behalf of the town. Along with The Wilson, the Trust now manages the Town Hall, the Pittville Pump Room, the Prince of Wales Stadium and Leisure @, a large fitness and swimming complex. A volunteer board of Trustees controls the Trust.

The Cheltenham Paint Festival attracts hundreds of mural artists from dozens of countries worldwide and is a highlight of the Gloucestershire arts calendar. In 2014, a piece of graffiti by street artist Banksy appeared next to a telephone box in a residential street in Cheltenham. The graffiti depicted three men in trench coats and dark glasses apparently listening in to calls made in the telephone box. In 2016, it was removed – possibly destroyed – ahead of the sale of the house on which it had been painted.

Cheltenham features several sculptural artworks of note, including:

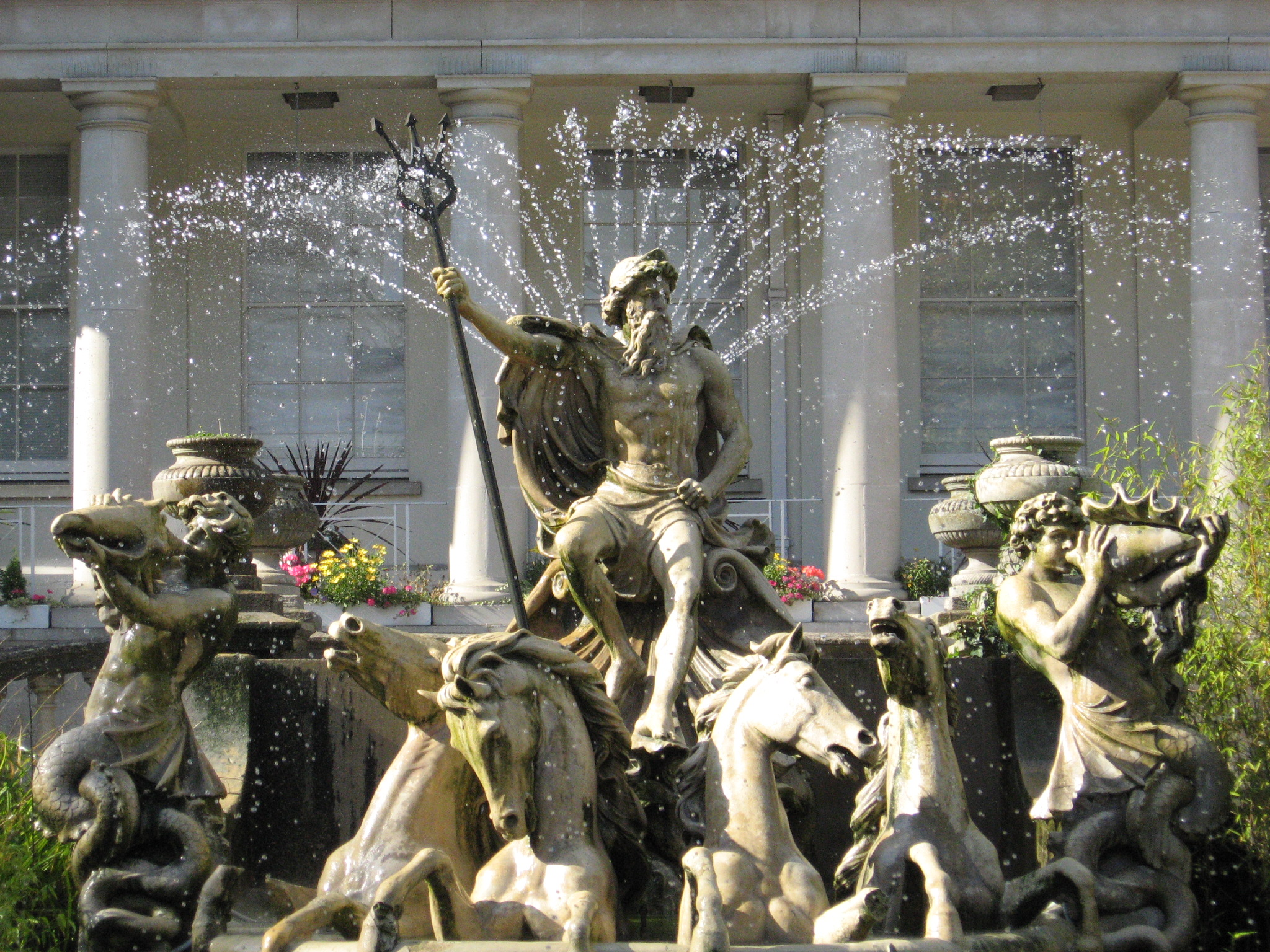
Neptune's Fountain

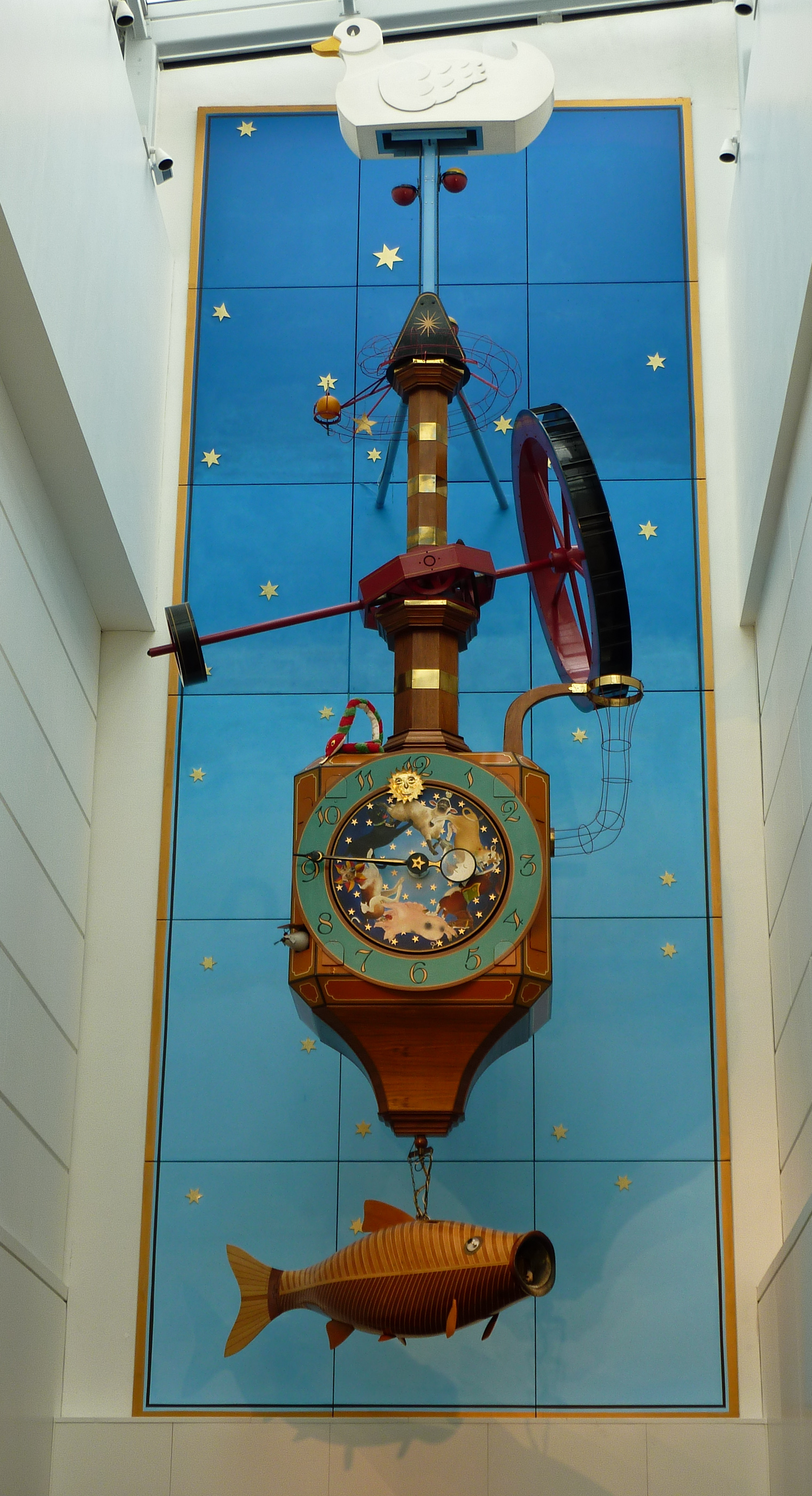
The mechanical clock in the Regent Shopping Arcade, designed by Kit Williams. The distance from the duck to the fish is 14 metres.

- Neptune's Fountain in the Promenade, built in 1893 and designed by Joseph Hall
- The Hare and the Minotaur, also in the Promenade, created in 1995 by Sophie Ryder
- A life-size bronze of an Emperor Penguin by Nick Bibby and placed in the foyer of The Wilson art gallery and museum in 2015
- The Wishing Fish Clock in the Regent Shopping Arcade, unveiled in 1987 and designed by Kit Williams

Music

Cheltenham hosts the annual Cheltenham Music Festival, Cheltenham Jazz Festival and the Ukulele Festival of Great Britain.

In 2010, Cheltenham was named the UK's fifth "most musical" city (sic) by PRS for Music.

Musicians Brian Jones, guitarist and founding member of the Rolling Stones, and Michael Burston, nicknamed 'Würzel' of Motörhead were both born in Cheltenham, with Jones buried in the town's crematorium following his death in 1969. Other Cheltenham-born musicians of international renown include Gustav Holst, for whom there is a dedicated museum and a monument in the town, and FKA Twigs.

Progressive-indie band No Atlas is also from Cheltenham.

History

The collection's of the Cheltenham Art Gallery & Museum include decorative arts from the era of the Arts and Crafts Movement. The collection enjoys National Designation by the Arts Council of England. The Holst Birthplace Museum contains personal belongings of the composer of The Planets, including his piano. It also includes a working Victorian kitchen and laundry, Regency drawing room and an Edwardian nursery.

The Cheltenham Civic Society has been responsible for erecting commemorative plaques in the town since 1982: blue plaques to celebrate well-known people and green plaques to celebrate significant places and events.

Festivals

Every year, Cheltenham Festivals organises music, jazz, literature and science festivals in the town, attracting names with national and international reputations in each field. Events take place at venues including the town hall, the Everyman Theatre, the Playhouse Theatre and the Pittville Pump Room.

Several other cultural festivals, including the Cheltenham International Film Festival, Cheltenham Paranormal Festival, the Cheltenham Design Festival, Cheltenham Folk Festival, Cheltenham Poetry Festival, The True Believers Comic Festival and Cheltenham Comedy Festival are separately organised but also attract international performers and speakers. A more local event, the Cheltenham Festival of the Performing Arts (formerly Cheltenham Competitive Festival) is a collection of more than 300 performance competitions that is the oldest of Cheltenham's arts festivals, having been started in 1926.

Greenbelt, a Christian arts and music festival, and Wychwood Festival, a family-friendly folk and world music festival, were held at Cheltenham Racecourse. The town also hosts the multi-venue Walk the line festival.

Two sporting events are also routinely described as the "Cheltenham Festival" or "the Festival": the Cheltenham Cricket Festival, which features Gloucestershire County Cricket Club, and National Hunt racing's Cheltenham Festival.

In 2021 the Cheltenham 7s festival began and is held at the end of July each year at the Newlands Rugby club opposite the main GE Aviation (ex Smiths Industries site) works between Southam and Bishops Cleeve. It is a festival of 7s sport, which includes Netball, Rugby, Dodgeball and Hockey amongst others and incorporates drinking and musical acts over the weekend to complement the sport.

Film and television

Cheltenham has played host to and featured in a number of film and TV series:

- Butterflies location work was predominantly filmed in Cheltenham.
- If.... (1968) was filmed at Cheltenham College (and other locations).
- The Whistle Blower, a spy thriller, was largely filmed in Cheltenham, as GCHQ is central to the plot.
- The Full Monteverdi, a 2007 British film written and directed by John La Bouchardière, was partly filmed in Cheltenham.
- The House of Eliott, a British television series produced and broadcast by the BBC between 1991 and 1994, was partly filmed in Cheltenham.
- Vanity Fair, a BBC serialised adaptation of William Makepeace Thackery's novel of the same name, was partly filmed in Cheltenham.

The Thistle Golden Valley Hotel was used by the ITV soap opera Crossroads for outdoor location filming from 1982 to 1985.

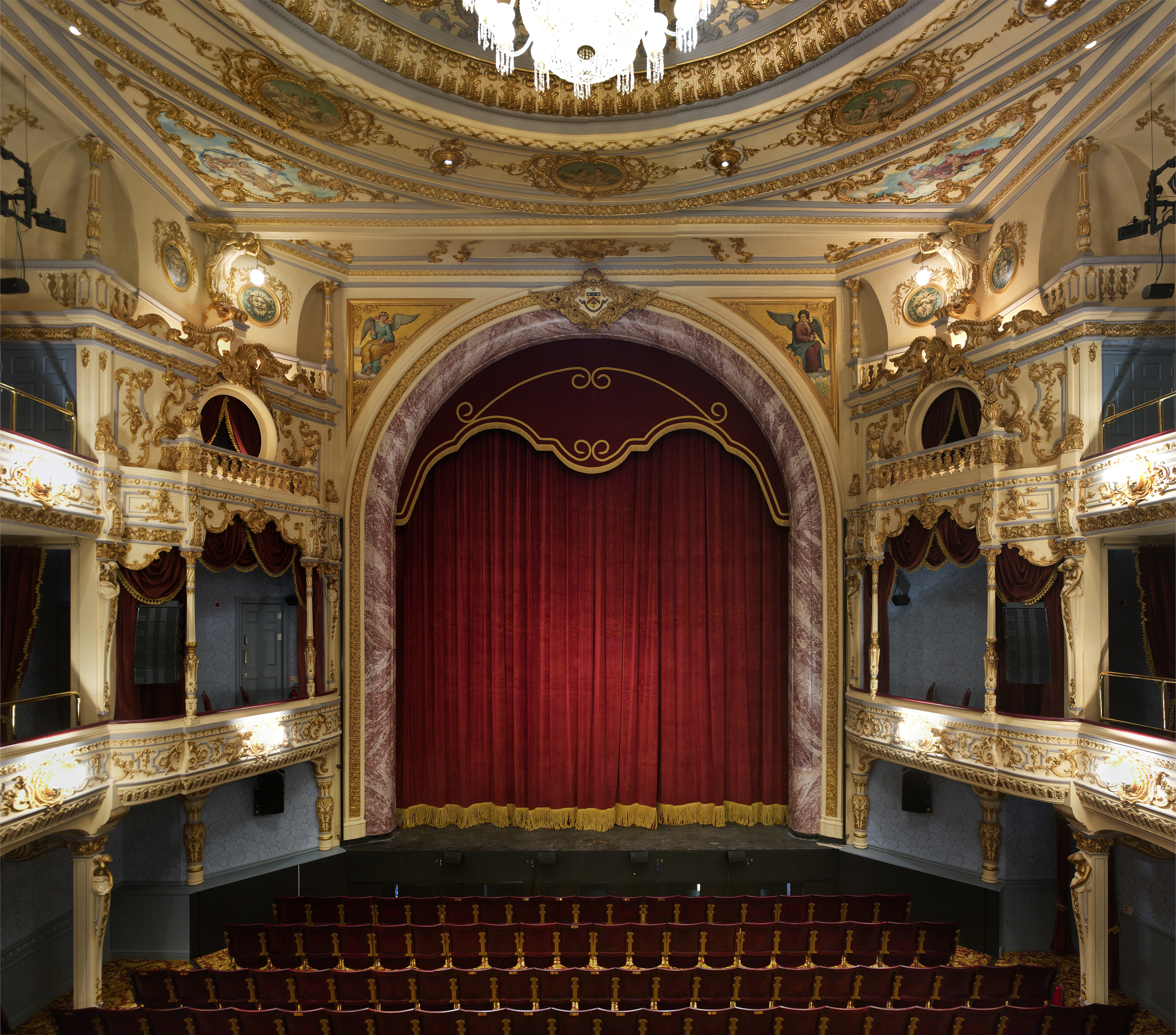
The Everyman Theatre

Theatre

Cheltenham has four theatres: the Everyman, the Playhouse, the Bacon and the Parabola Arts Centre.

Brewing

DEYA Brewing Company is an independent brewery in Cheltenham, that focuses on hoppy beers, lagers, traditional UK styles and mixed fermentation ales.

== Demography ==
According to mid-2021 population figures published by the ONS, the population of Cheltenham stood at 118,866, making it the second largest settlement in Gloucestershire by population, after the city of Gloucester.

Ethnicity and religion

According to the 2021 census, the population ethnicity breakdown is as follows:

- White: 108,559 people or 91.4%
- Asian: 4,922 people or 4.1%
- Mixed: 2,949 people or 2.5%
- Other: 1,225 people or 1.0%
- Black: 1,181 people or 1.0%

The population religious breakdown is as follows (2021 census):

- Christian: 54,073 people or 45.5%
- Buddhist: 559 people or 0.5%
- Hindu: 1,192 people or 1.0%
- Jewish: 198 people or 0.2%
- Muslim: 1,744 people or 1.5%
- Sikh: 181 people or 0.2%
- Other: 60,889 people or 51.2%

There are numerous Protestant and Catholic churches throughout the town, and a Hindu Temple and a Mosque can also be found in the northern area of the town near St Pauls.

== Crime and public safety ==
In 2013, Cheltenham was identified by the Complete University Guide as one of the safest towns for university students in the UK.

Based on data from 2023 to 2024, Cheltenham was described by CrimeRate.co.uk as "the safest major town in Gloucestershire", despite its crime rate being 55% higher than the county's average. It ranked as the 23rd most dangerous location out of 305 towns in Gloucestershire, with violence and sexual offences being the most common crimes.

Crime statistics: The overall crime rate for the period December 2023 to November 2024 was 107 per thousand residents, which is considered medium compared to other UK boroughs.

In January 2024, Cheltenham was noted for having the highest burglary rate in Gloucestershire with 53 incidents and led in criminal damage and arson with 84 crimes.

Ward-level data from 2023 showed Cheltenham's crime rate at 119.85 per 1,000, with a 3.78% year-on-year increase, with St Paul's, Lansdown, and College wards having the highest rates.

From December 2023 to November 2024, the crime rate was 105.1 per 1,000, with a noted increase in drug-related crimes by 6.4%.

=== Police ===
Gloucestershire Constabulary is the territorial police force responsible for policing the town covering 14 neighbourhoods in the Cheltenham area.

== Education ==
The oldest school in Cheltenham is Pate's Grammar School (founded in 1574). Cheltenham College (founded in 1841) was the first of the public schools of the Victorian period. The school was the setting in 1968 for the classic Lindsay Anderson film if..... It also hosts the annual Cheltenham Cricket Festival, first staged in 1872, and the oldest cricket festival in the world.

The most famous school in the town, according to The Good Schools Guide, is Cheltenham Ladies' College (founded in 1853). Dean Close School was founded in 1886 as the 79th public school in the Victorian period, founded in memory of the Reverend Francis Close (1797–1882), a former rector of Cheltenham. Cheltenham Bournside School moved to its current location in 1972. The town also includes several campuses of the University of Gloucestershire, two other independent and six other state secondary schools, plus institutions of further education.

== Local media ==
Local TV coverage is served by both BBC Midlands Today and BBC Points West on BBC One, ITV News Central and ITV News West Country on ITV1.

Cheltenham's local radio stations are BBC Radio Gloucestershire on 104.7 FM, Greatest Hits Radio South West on 107.5 FM, Heart West on 102.4 FM and Cheltenham Radio which broadcast during the Cheltenham Festival.

The town is served by the local newspaper, Gloucestershire Echo.

== Sport and leisure ==
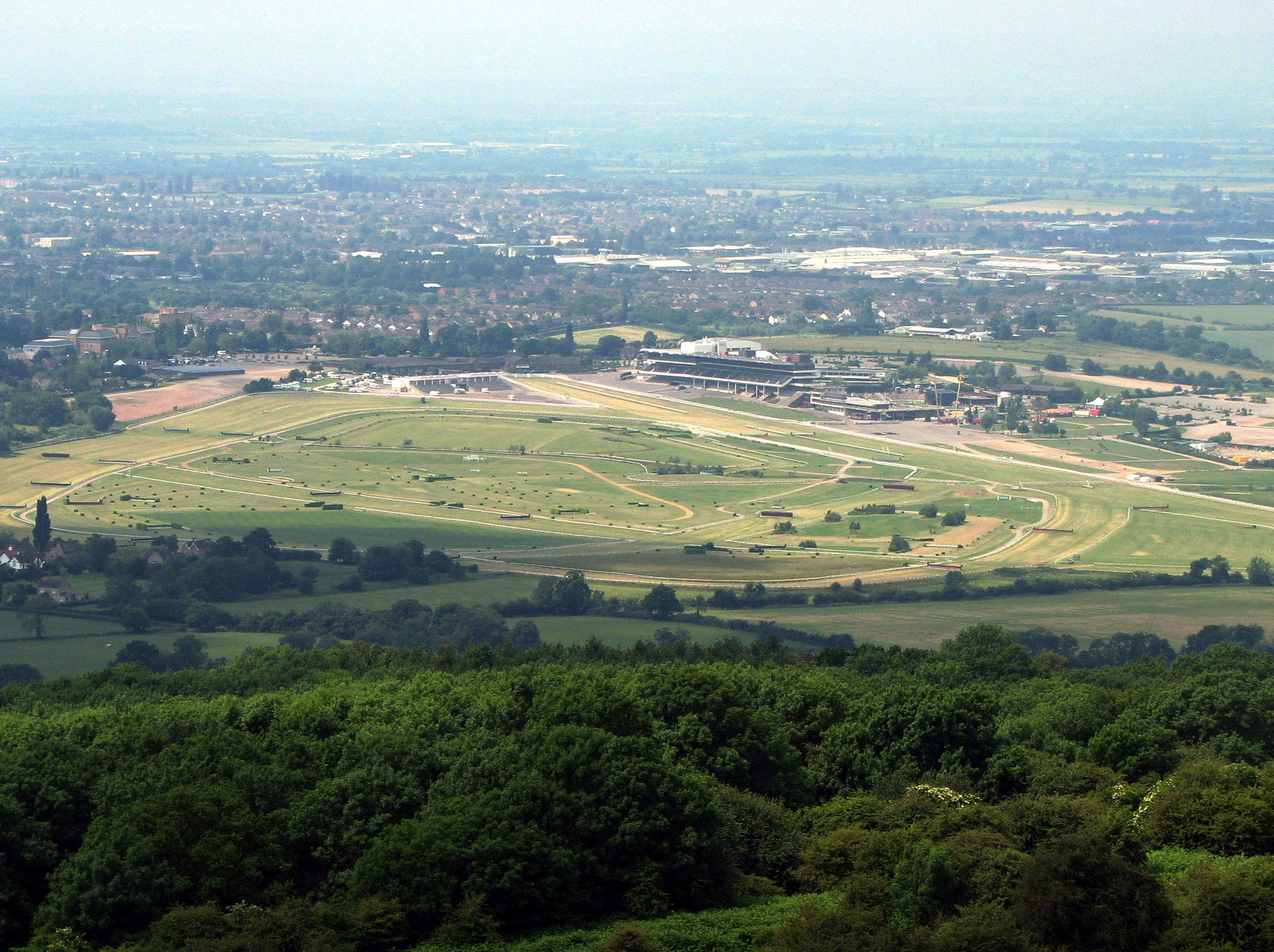
The racecourse from Cleeve Hill

Cheltenham Racecourse, in the nearby village of Prestbury, is the home of National Hunt, or jumps, racing in the UK. Meetings are hosted from October to April. The highlight of the season is the Cheltenham Gold Cup, which is normally held in the middle of March, during the Cheltenham Festival.

The town's football teams are the professional team Cheltenham Town F.C., who play in the Football League Two, and semi-professional sides Bishop's Cleeve, who play in the Hellenic League Premier, Cheltenham Saracens F.C. in the Hellenic League Division One.

Amateur rugby union clubs include Cheltenham Tigers R.F.C., Cheltenham Saracens RFC, Cheltenham North R.F.C., Old Patesians R.F.C., Smiths Rugby and Cheltenham Civil Service R.F.C.

In rugby league, university side Gloucestershire All Golds were admitted into the semi-professional Championship 1. The Cheltenham Rugby Festival is a rugby league nines event held in May.

The town has one golf course, Lilley Brook, in Charlton Kings.

Cheltenham has one of the largest croquet clubs in the country, and is home to the headquarters of the national body of the sport, the Croquet Association. The East Glos tennis, squash and women's hockey club, which was founded in 1885, is also located in the town.

Sandford Parks Lido is one of the largest outdoor pools in England. There is a 50 m (164 ft) main pool, a children's pool and paddling pool, set in landscaped gardens. Sandford Parks Lido is the home of Cheltenham Swimming and Water Polo Club. In 2021, Cheltenham Borough Council gave Sandford Parks Lido a new 35-year lease to continue operating the lido.

=== Cheltenham Festival ===
Cheltenham Festival is a significant National Hunt racing meeting, and has race prize money second only to the Grand National. It is an event where many of the best British and Irish trained horses race against each other, the extent of which is relatively rare during the rest of the season.

The festival takes place annually in March at Cheltenham Racecourse. The meeting is often very popular with Irish visitors, mostly because of that nation's affinity with horse racing, but also because it usually coincides with St. Patrick's Day, a national holiday in celebration of the patron saint of Ireland.

Large amounts of money are bet during festival week, with hundreds of millions of pounds being gambled over the four days. Cheltenham is often noted for its atmosphere, most notably the "Cheltenham roar", which refers to the enormous amount of noise that the crowd generates as the starter raises the tape for the first race of the festival.

== Transport ==
=== Railways ===
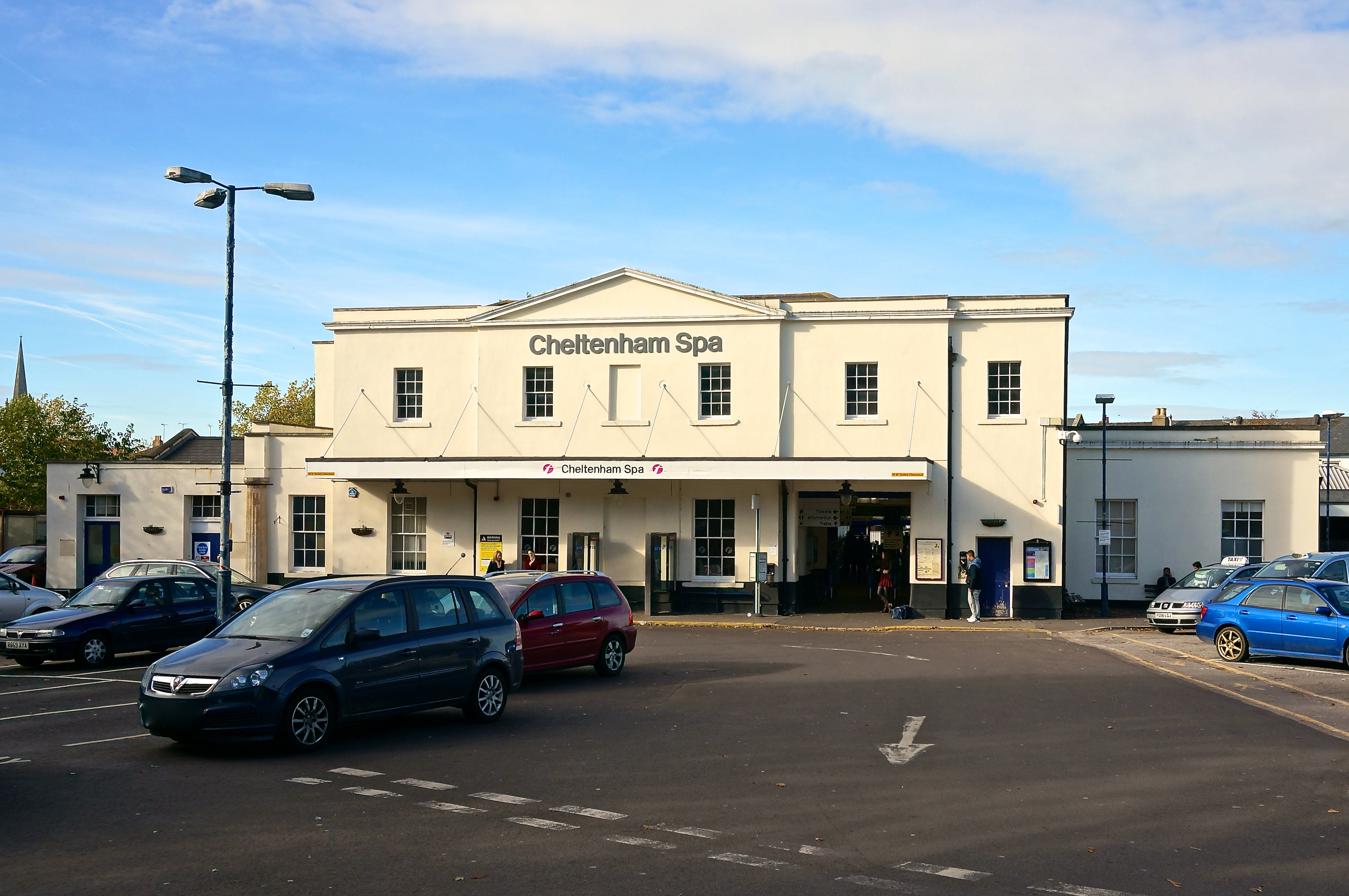
The entrance of Cheltenham Spa station

Cheltenham Spa railway station is a stop on the Bristol-Birmingham main line. It is located to the west of the Montpellier area of the town and is known locally as Lansdown.

The station is served by three train operating companies:

- CrossCountry operates long-distance services between the South West, South Wales, the Midlands, the North West, the North East and Scotland.
- Great Western Railway connects the town with Bristol Temple Meads, Worcester Foregate Street, Gloucester, Swindon and London Paddington.
- Transport for Wales operates services between Cheltenham Spa and South Wales, usually running through to Maesteg via Gloucester, Chepstow, Newport, Cardiff Central and Bridgend.

The Cheltenham Spa Express, once known as the Cheltenham Flyer, is a named passenger train connecting Cheltenham with London. The former Cheltenham Flyer was, for a time, the fastest passenger train in scheduled service in the world.

At its peak, the town had eight railway stations, only one of which survives. It is a matter of local controversy that trains are not run directly to London but instead via Gloucester; although routes do exist for a direct and therefore much faster service, as demonstrated during 2023 when a bridge closure in Oxfordshire led to some services to Hereford stopping at Cheltenham.

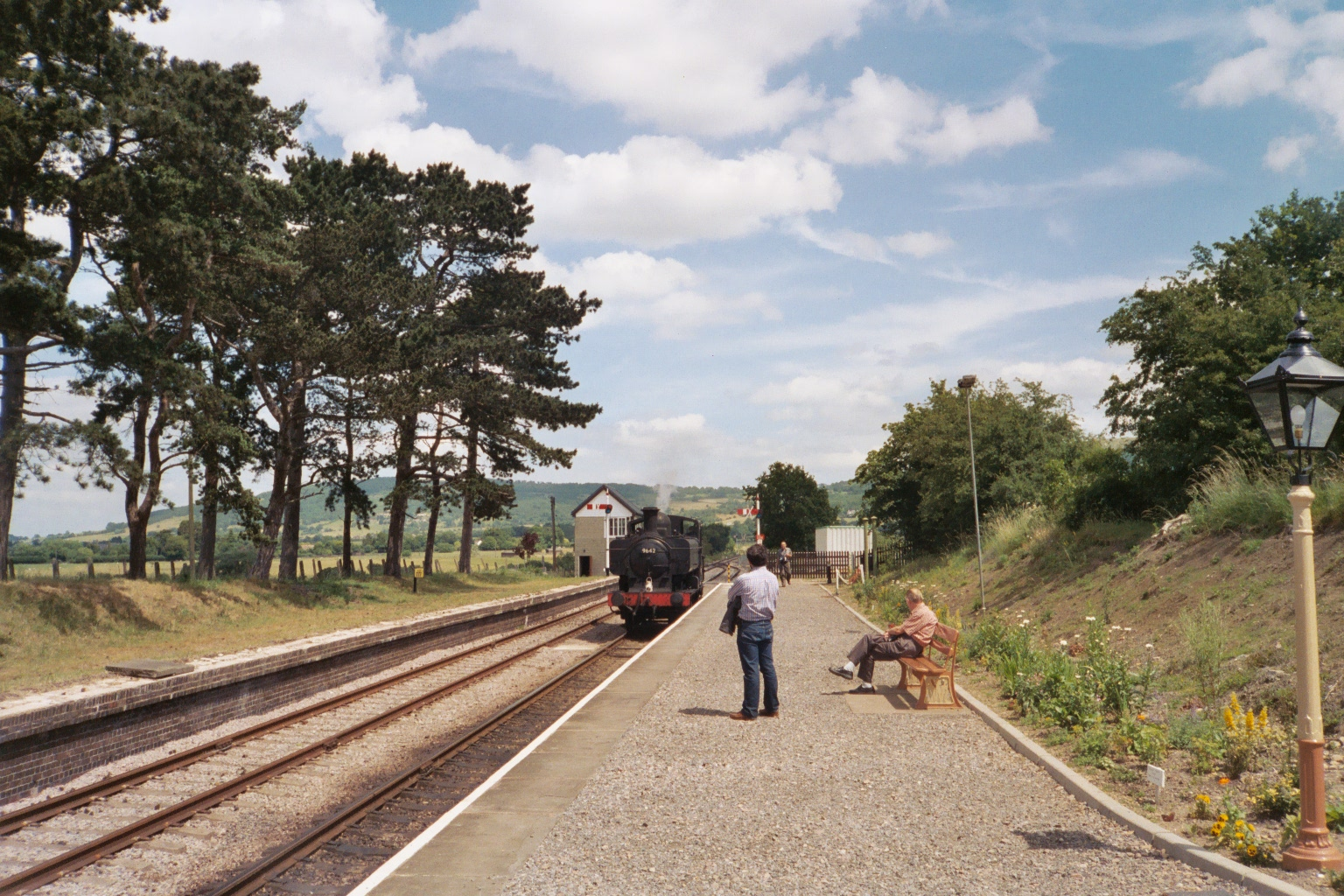
Cheltenham Racecourse station platforms

The restored Cheltenham Racecourse railway station is the southern terminus of the heritage Gloucestershire Warwickshire Railway. The Honeybourne Line was extended northwards to Broadway in 2018, with an aspiration to extend the line southwards to Cheltenham Spa where the line originally branched off from the Bristol to Birmingham main line.

=== Roads ===
Cheltenham is adjacent to the M5 motorway, between Bristol and Birmingham. Junction 10 serves the north of the town, via the A4019; junction 11 links to the south, via the A40 which continues towards Oxford and London.

=== Buses and coaches ===
Stagecoach West operate the majority of bus services in Cheltenham, including routes to Gloucester and Tewkesbury.

National Express operates a number of coach services from Cheltenham including route 444 to London and Heathrow Airport. Before becoming part of National Express, Cheltenham was a major hub for Black and White Coaches, with routes throughout the country, many of which formed a mass exodus through the town at 14:30 each day.

=== Tramroad ===
Cheltenham was a terminus of the Gloucester and Cheltenham Tramroad.

== Churches ==
The first parish church is Cheltenham Minster, St Mary's, which is the only surviving medieval building in the town. As a result of expansion of the population, absorption of surrounding villages, and the efforts of both evangelical and Anglo-Catholic missions, the town has a large number of other parish churches, including Trinity Church and All Saints', Pittville, where the composer Gustav Holst's father was the organist.

St Gregory's Roman Catholic church is an example of the work of the architect Charles Hansom. The Gothic Revival building was built 1854–57, the porch was added in 1859, the tower and spire were completed in 1861 and the nave was extended to join the tower in 1877. The church's stained glass is by Hardman & Co.

=== Bell ringing ===
The town has three rings of bells hung for change ringing. One is located in St Mark's Church – a ring of 8 bells, with the heaviest being some 16cwt. These were originally a ring of 5 bells cast at John Taylor of Loughborough in 1885, extensively overhauled and augmented in 8 in 2007. Another is at St. Christopher's (Warden Hill), the lightest ring of church bells in the world. The other is a ring of 12 bells hung in St. Mary's Church (the Minster). These were the venue in 2008 for the eliminators of the National 12 Bell Striking contest, in which teams of campanologists from around the world compete to win the Taylor Trophy. In 2017 the old ring of 12 was completely replaced with new bells cast by John Taylor & Co. The tenor bell is just over a ton in weight, and the new ring also includes a thirteenth bell, a sharp 2nd, to provide a lighter 8. The towers in the locality of Cheltenham belong to the Cheltenham branch of the Gloucester & Bristol Diocesan Association of Church Bell Ringers.

== Twin towns ==
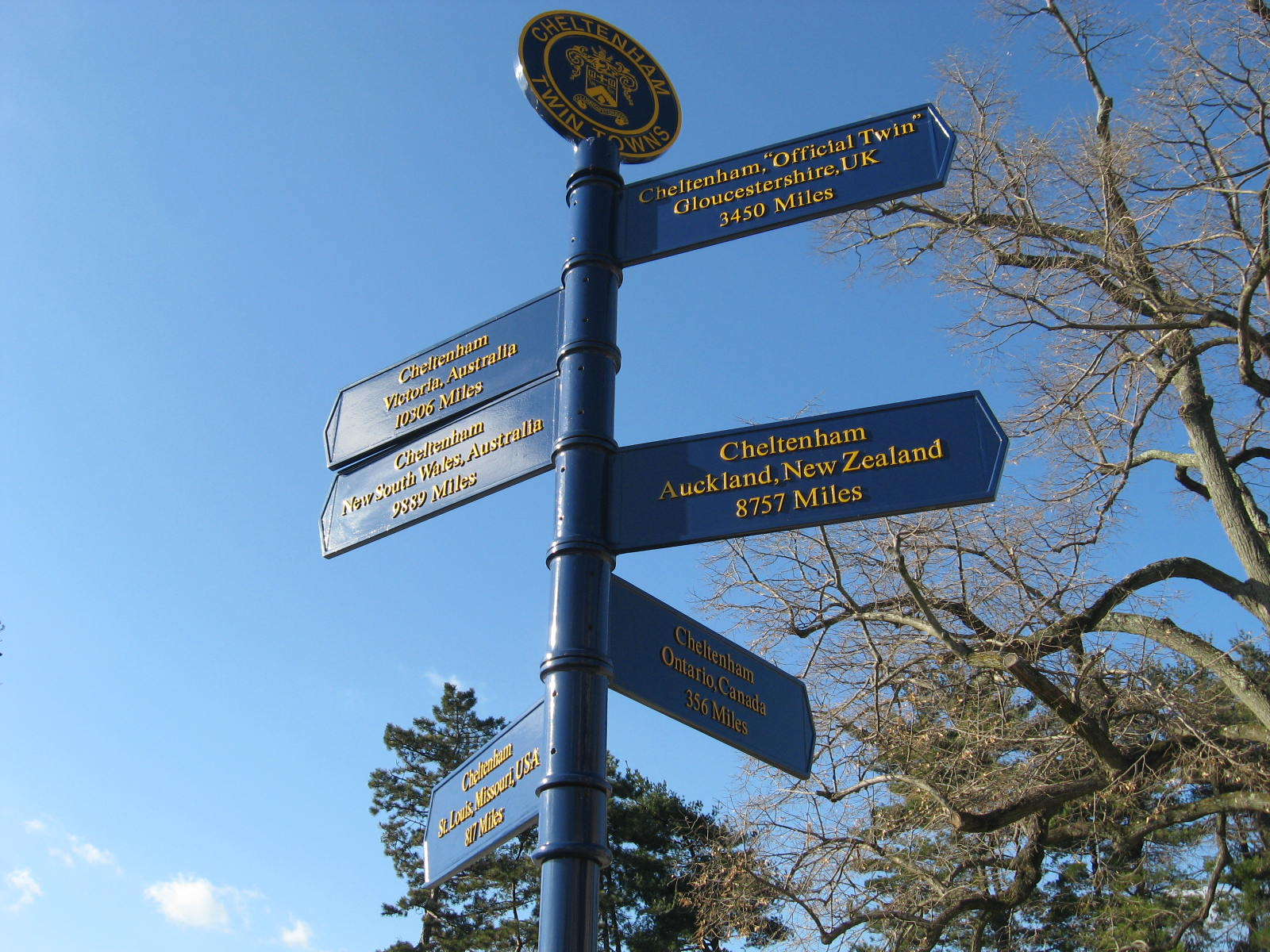
A fingerpost in Cheltenham Township, Pennsylvania, highlighting Cheltenham as the "Official Twin." The signpost points to other cities in the world named "Cheltenham".

Cheltenham is twinned with:

- Annecy, Auvergne-Rhône-Alpes, France
- Cheltenham, Pennsylvania, United States
- Göttingen, Lower Saxony, Germany
- Weihai, Shandong, China

Twinning with Sochi, Russia was suspended in response to 2022 Russian invasion of Ukraine.

== See also ==
- Acclaim Cheltenham, a game studio that made Extreme-G 3 and XGRA: Extreme-G Racing Association
- Arle Court Transport Hub
- Cheltenham (UK Parliament constituency)
- Hawkstone Brewery, a brewery based in Cheltenham
- HMS Cheltenham, a Racecourse-class minesweeper of 1916
- List of spa towns in the United Kingdom

== Sources ==
This article incorporates text from a free content work. Licensed under Open Government Licence v3.0 (license statement/permission). Text taken from Employment, unemployment and economic inactivity in Cheltenham, Office for National Statistics. www.ons.gov.uk.
