= River Chelt =

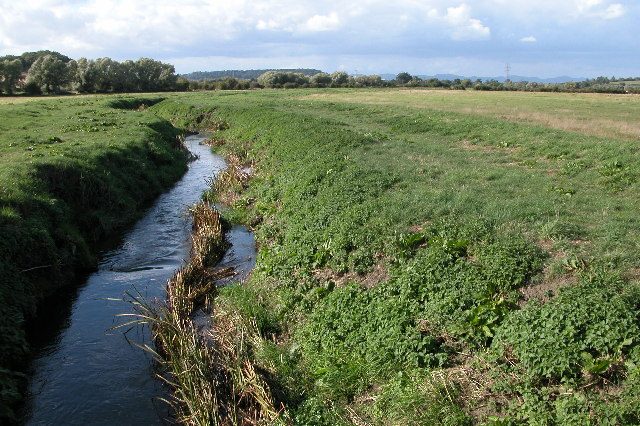
- River Chelt near Wainlode (September 2005)

- Location within Gloucestershire

Location
- Country: England
- Counties: Gloucestershire

Physical characteristics
- Mouth
  - location: River Severn
  - coordinates: 51.9337°N 2.2221°W
- Length: 22 km (14 mi)

The River Chelt is a tributary of England's largest river, the Severn. The Chelt flows through the western edge of the Cotswolds and the town of Cheltenham, from which it derives its name, before its confluence with the River Severn at Wainlodes Hill.

There were a number of mills along the length of the river, the highest being in Charlton Kings and the lowest at Norton where the river passes under the present A38.

The river caused significant flooding in 1979 and 2007.

== See also ==
- List of rivers of England
