= Cheltenham Playhouse =

Theatre in Cheltenham, England

The Playhouse

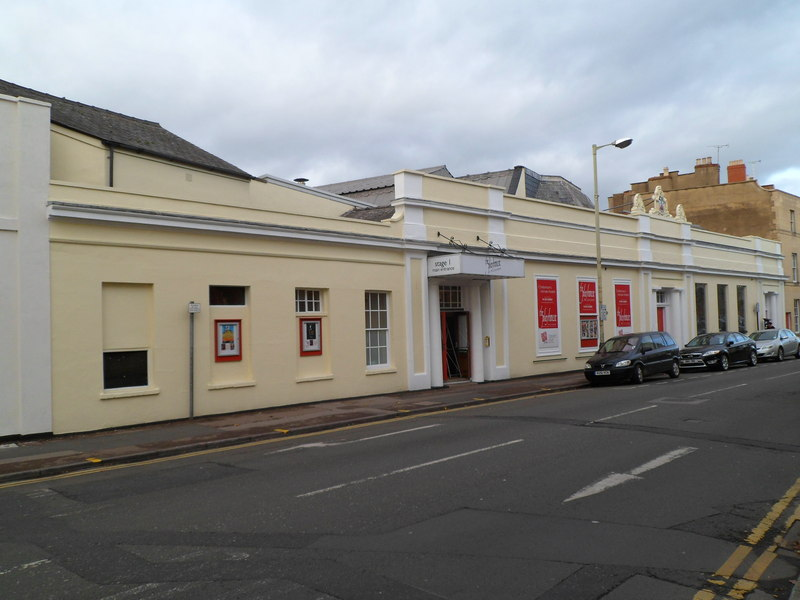

- Location within Gloucestershire
- Coordinates: 51.896805°N 2.074265°W
- Capacity: 186
- Type: Theatre

Construction
- Opened: 1945

Website
- cheltplayhouse.org.uk/CheltPlayhouse.dll/Home

Cheltenham Playhouse is a community theatre in Cheltenham, England, UK. It opened in 1945 as the Civic Playhouse and was run by the Corporation of Cheltenham; it was taken over by volunteers in 1958 who continue to run the operation as a registered charity. It is housed in the former Montpellier Baths and the building dates back to 1806/7, making it one of the two oldest surviving spa buildings in the town. The building is Grade II listed.

== History ==
In 1944, the Corporation of Cheltenham (now Cheltenham Borough Council) realised the town's lack of theatrical facilities and, spearheaded by town clerk Frank Littlewood, decided to open a civic playhouse to act as a home for local amateur companies. They decided to convert the swimming pool part of the Montpellier Baths complex and, despite war time restrictions on material and manpower, it opened on 9 April 1945, making it one of a tiny handful of new theatres to commence operating during World War II. Goodwill messages and telegrams came from George Bernard Shaw and Ralph Richardson (who had been born in the town). The Corporation funded the services of the front of house staff, the cashier and box office facilities and all the publicity. A consultant producer and resident stage manager were also provided at the council's expense to assist the amateur groups, although the production requirements and expenses remained the responsibility of the societies. The first play performed was Shaw's Arms and the Man.

On 5 April 1950, the auditorium was severely damaged by fire. The repair work was evidently undertaken with speed and the theatre was only closed for five months. However, the fire destroyed part of one of the theatre’s balconies (which were formerly viewing balconies for the swimming pool) and this was not restored until 2007.

When the Corporation decided it no longer wished to fund the theatre, volunteers formed the Theatre & Arts Club in 1956 and they officially took over the running of the venue in 1958 and over time acquired more part of the building which, at that time, were still being used as baths or for medical treatments.

During the 2007 United Kingdom floods the theatre was flooded twice within the space of five weeks. Only two performances had to be cancelled.

In 2008, the auditorium and green room underwent a £340,000 refurbishment, half of which was funded by the council, together with additional donations from the Summerfield Charitable Trust, Trefoil Trust, a bequest from a founder member, several of the resident non-professional companies, and the charity's own fundraising efforts.

In 2019, planning permission was obtained for a major redevelopment of much of the complex (excluding the auditorium). Funding was sought in the region of £3.5 million to achieve the charity's ambition to become a fully-staffed professional arts centre while still remaining home to local performers.

The theatre failed to receive £50,000 from the Culture Recovery Fund (CRF) during the COVID-19 pandemic. Local residents launched a crowdfunder and this, together with individual donations, raised over £30,000. Pianist Peter Gill raised an additional £5,000 by playing non-stop for 24 hours. The theatre subsequently received £50,000 in the second round of the CRF.

== Theatre companies ==
The Playhouse is the home of the amateur theatre group now known as Playhouse Arts, formerly The Playhouse Company.

== Montpellier Baths ==
In 1716, the first mineral springs were discovered in Cheltenham, transforming it into a spa town. 1806/7 saw the opening of a small complex built by Henry Thompson that encompassed a handful of baths, a sudatory (steam room) and a self-administering enema machine. Around this time he also built Hygeia House to make use of three wells on its site for the taking of the waters but within a few years he turned this into his private house and in 1809 opened the Montpellier Spa for this purpose (which is now The Ivy restaurant). Water was pumped from around Thompson's land to the complex on this site so that in addition to the baths he could open a salts laboratory for the manufacturing of the Real Cheltenham Salts that could be added to water for bathing.

The complex was enlarged circa 1818 when it boasted 14 warm baths, fitted with marble and Dutch tile, one large cold bath plus smaller ones and a boiler capable of heating up to 190 °F (88 °C). Further enlargements followed in the 1830s and in the 1840s a large swimming pool was established; this was refurbished by the Corporation of Cheltenham when they bought the complex in 1899. The current auditorium is built over this pool and is used as a furniture store; it is shown each September as part of Heritage Open Days. In the Edwardian times in addition to slipper baths upstairs, the ground floor was used as a medicinal spa for a variety of treatments including a radioactive mud bath.
