= Henry Skillicorne =

English merchant and entrepreneur

Henry Skillicorne (c. 1678–1763) was a Manx-born merchant mariner who after some four decades trading out of Bristol began a second career as the first serious developer of the spa waters in Cheltenham. Regarded as 'the founder of Cheltenham as a watering place' in all the standard histories of the town, his memorial inscription in the parish church, standing at 53 lines and almost 600 words, is one of the longest in Britain, and has been transcribed and reproduced many times.

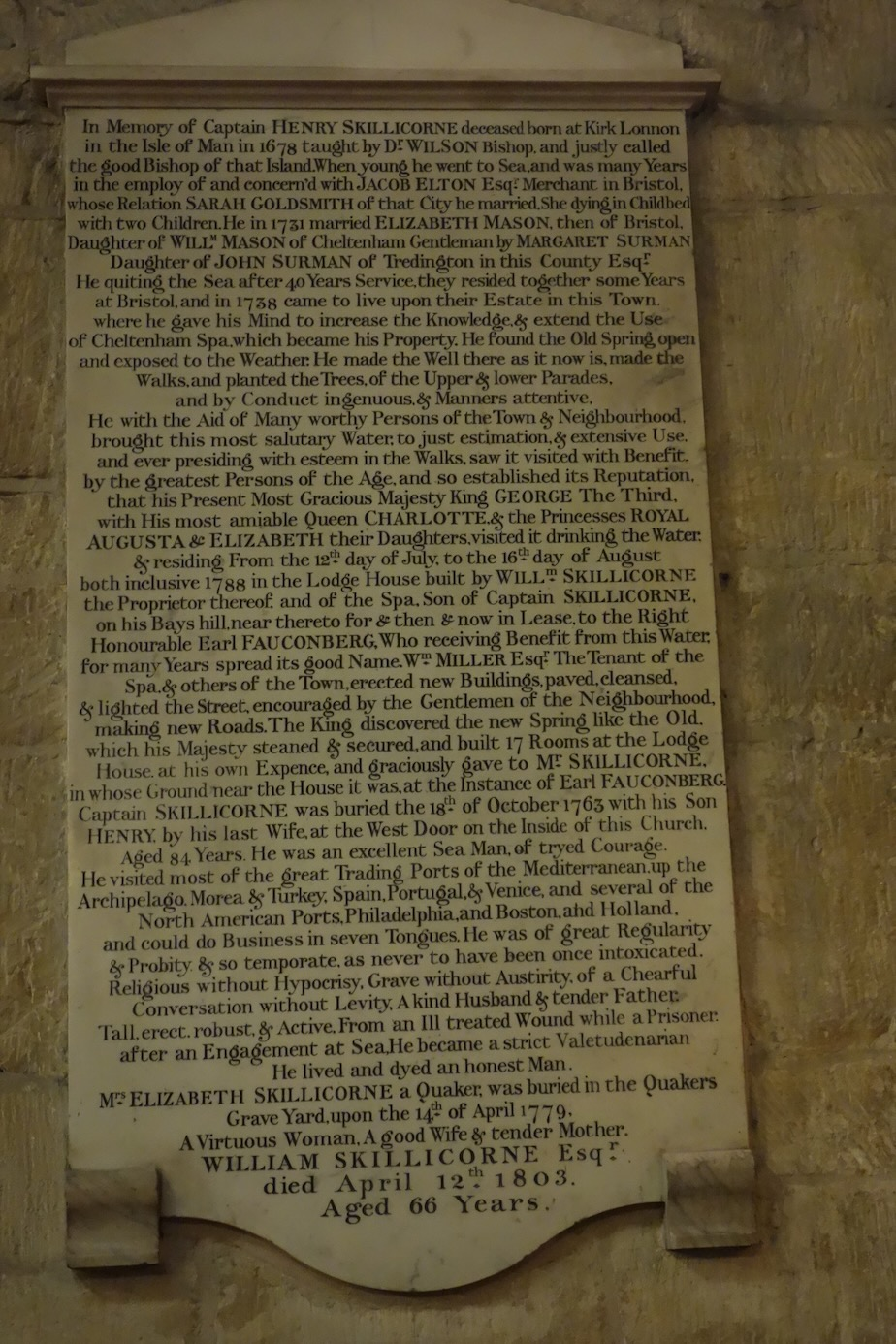
Memorial inscription of Henry Skillicorne in Cheltenham parish church

== Origins ==
He was born at Kirk Lonan on the Isle of Man in 1678, and was taught by Dr Thomas Wilson, the long-serving bishop of Sodor and Man; his schooling included instruction in navigation.

== Maritime career ==
Much if not all of his career was in association with Jacob Elton, member of a prominent Bristol merchant family. As captain of and shareholder in an Elton-owned galley, he made regular trips to the Mediterranean, and claimed to be able to 'do business in seven tongues'. He gave up his sea career not long after his second marriage, in 1732, to Elizabeth Mason.

== Development of Cheltenham as a spa resort ==
Skillicorne's unique contribution to the town was to provide a broad vision for developing a potential attraction into a real one, and for engaging others in this enterprise without special regard for himself. His new wife was the heir to a number of land holdings in Cheltenham, including a field at Bayshill, rising ground to the south of the main street where in 1716 a mineral spring had been discovered. Initial exploitation of the Cheltenham waters by the Mason family had been on only a modest scale, and Skillicorne, familiar with the thriving Hotwells in Bristol, saw clearly the potential for drawing in more visitors to the town. In 1738 he and Elizabeth moved up from Bristol to Cheltenham, and he soon began adding more facilities to the original well. He enclosed the well itself, and built an elaborate well-house, a square brick building on four arches with a dome over it, and erected a pump on the east side in the form of an obelisk. He laid out attractive walks both near the well itself, and on a new axis (in due course known as the 'Old Well Walk') leading to the parish church at the heart of the town. He planted these walks with a variety of shrubs and trees. In this, he had the support and contributions of many local traders and gentry. A Bristol acquaintance, Norborne Berkeley MP, assisted in the landscape design. The reputation of the spa flourished, with Skillicorne presiding 'with esteem' over its growth.

== Death and legacy ==
Henry Skillicorne died in 1763, ownership of the spa passing to his son William Skillicorne, who continued its careful development, to the point where it was deemed suitable for the six-week royal visit of 1788, by George III, which set the seal on the town's reputation as a fashionable resort. His memorial tablet was erected following extensive instructions set out in the will of his son William, who died in 1803: it greatly helped shape his posthumous reputation, although it is not entirely complete or accurate. Among his descendants were two mayors of Cheltenham. A garden behind the town hall carries his name, as does a modern housing development, Skillicorne Mews, in the Lansdown district of Cheltenham. The site of the original well is now part of the premises of Cheltenham Ladies' College.
