= Weird Fish =

British clothing and accessories retailer

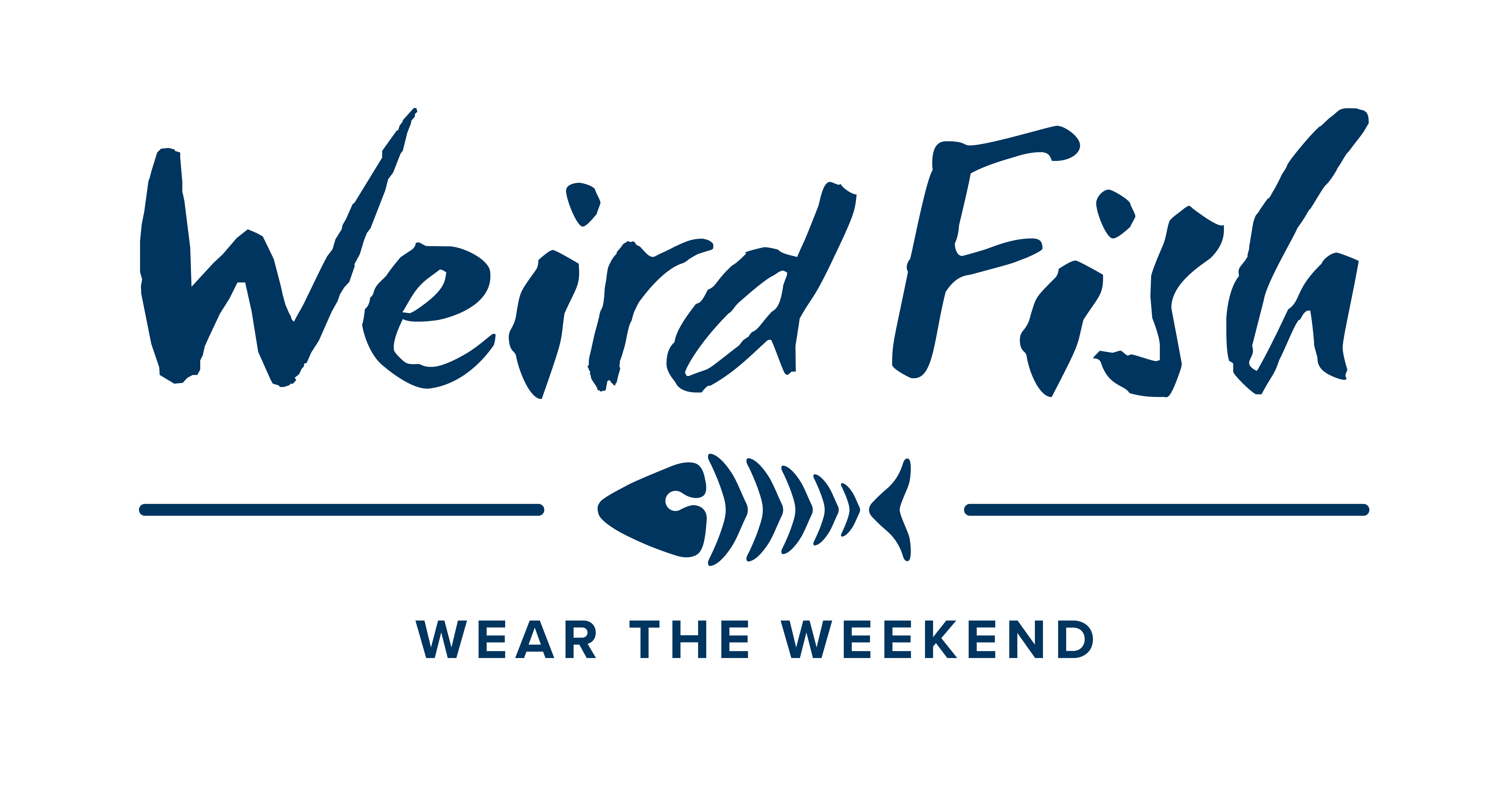

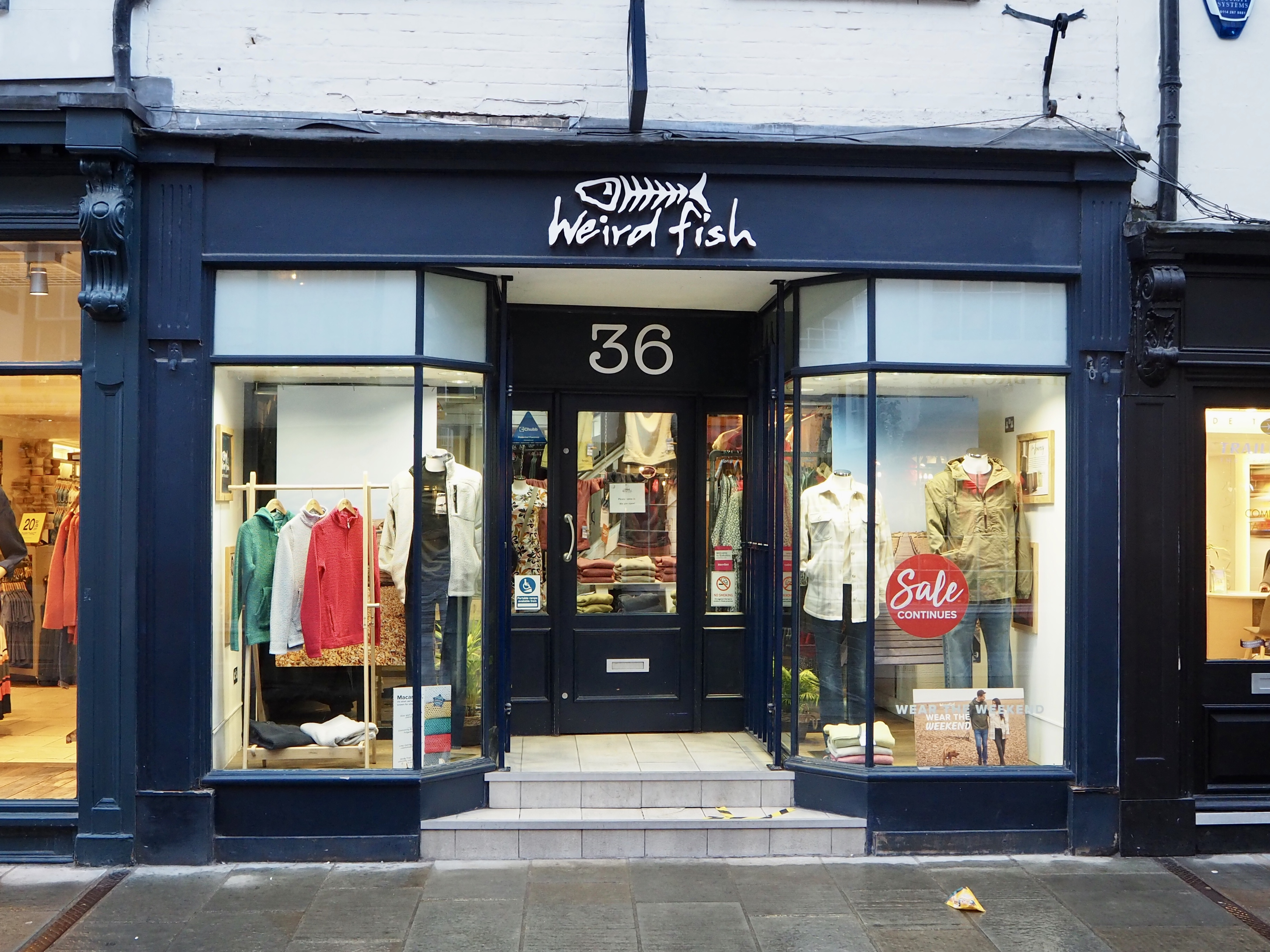
- Branch in York
- Type: Private company
- Industry: Clothing and Accessories
- Key people: John Stockton (Managing Director); Bethany Phillips (Director)
- Products: Clothing; Footwear; Accessories
- Revenue: 13.8 million GBP (2013)
- Website: www.weirdfish.co.uk

Weird Fish is a British lifestyle clothing and accessories retailer. The company sells in its own stores around the United Kingdom, via third party stockists and online.

As of 2019, the company had fifteen of its own stores, with over 450 wholesale stockists.

== History ==
It was founded in 1993. In 2010 the company was subject of a management buy-out, backed by Piper Private Equity. At the time of the buyout annual sales were £10m.

In 2018 the company relocated from their offices in Cheltenham to Tewkesbury and in 2022 to relocate its warehouse to Bradford.

Since 2019, the retailer has given clothing to Newlife - The Charity for Disabled Children.

In January 2022, it partnered with sustainability platform Green Story to improve its environmental impact. In May 2022, Weird Fish announced partnerships with Next plc and Zalando. Weird Fish's online sales were £21m in total eCommerce revenue that year.
