= Grade II* listed buildings in Cheltenham =

There are over 20,000 Grade II* listed buildings in England. This page is a list of these buildings in the district of Cheltenham in Gloucestershire.

== List of buildings ==
Name	Location	Type	Completed (Note: The date given is the date used by Historic England as significant for the initial building or that of an important part in the structure's description.)	Date designated	Grid ref. (Note: The grid reference is based on the British national grid reference system, sometimes known as OSGB36, used by the Ordnance Survey.) Geo-coordinates	Entry number (Note: The "List Entry Number" is a unique number assigned to each listed building and scheduled monument by Historic England.)	Image
Charlton Park (St Edwards School Main Building)	Charlton Kings	Country house	c.1720	22 April 1950	SO9593820805; 51°53′09″N 2°03′38″W	1386593	Charlton Park (St Edwards School Main Building) More images
Church of St Mary	Charlton Kings	Parish church	Norman; c.1190	22 April 1950	SO9645020441; 51°52′57″N 2°03′11″W	1386562	Church of St Mary More images
Churchyard cross approximately 15 metres north-west of west door of Church of St Mary	Charlton Kings	Cross	15th century	24 April 1950	SO9642620458; 51°52′58″N 2°03′12″W	1386564	Churchyard cross approximately 15 metres north-west of west door of Church of St Mary
King's House	Charlton Kings	House	c.1603	22 April 1950	SO9660820724; 51°53′06″N 2°03′02″W	1386658	Upload Photo
South West Regency (administration) Block to St Edwards Middle School	Charlton Kings	Villa	c.1832	8 February 1983	SO9653621465; 51°53′30″N 2°03′06″W	1386540	Upload Photo
The Court House	Charlton Kings	House	1614	23 March 1982	SO9602420544; 51°53′00″N 2°03′33″W	1386653	Upload Photo
Church of St Peter	Leckhampton	Church	12th-century origins	4 July 1960	SO9429619403; 51°52′23″N 2°05′03″W	1340121	Church of St Peter More images
Leckhampton Court with wall and gate piers	Leckhampton	House	14th century	4 July 1960	SO9449919338; 51°52′21″N 2°04′53″W	1091754	Leckhampton Court with wall and gate piers More images
Church of St Mary	Prestbury	Anglican church	13th century	4 July 1960	SO9699223992; 51°54′52″N 2°02′43″W	1153687	Church of St Mary More images
Francis Kemmet(t) Monument in the churchyard of the Church of St Mary circa 3 metres north of north aisle	Prestbury	Chest tomb	1716	25 February 1987	SO9698724004; 51°54′52″N 2°02′43″W	1153742	Francis Kemmet(t) Monument in the churchyard of the Church of St Mary circa 3 metres north of north aisle More images
Church of St Lawrence	Swindon Village	Anglican church	12th century	4 July 1960	SO9346324886; 51°55′21″N 2°05′47″W	1091887	Church of St Lawrence More images
Alma House and walls and piers adjoining	Cheltenham	Villa	1838	12 March 1955	SO9484622120; 51°53′51″N 2°04′35″W	1387813	Alma House and walls and piers adjoining More images
Bayshill House and Lingwood House	Cheltenham	Villa	c.1839–42	12 March 1955	SO9446522184; 51°53′53″N 2°04′55″W	1386735	Upload Photo
Bayshill Lodge (1, 2 and 3), ballroom mews arch to north-west, and Nos 1–19 Rotunda Terrace	Cheltenham	House	1844/1851	12 March 1955	SO9439721891; 51°53′44″N 2°04′58″W	1387125	Bayshill Lodge (1, 2 and 3), ballroom mews arch to north-west, and Nos 1–19 Rotunda Terrace More images
Brandon House	Cheltenham	Villa	1834–39	12 March 1955	SO9438821087; 51°53′18″N 2°04′59″W	1387401	Brandon House More images
Cheltenham College (main block to road with Dining Hall and Chapel)	Cheltenham	Public school	1843	12 March 1955	SO9486121501; 51°53′31″N 2°04′34″W	1386726	Cheltenham College (main block to road with Dining Hall and Chapel) More images
Christ Church and adjacent Church Hall	Cheltenham	Church	1837–40	12 March 1955	SO9399622280; 51°53′57″N 2°05′19″W	1103838	Christ Church and adjacent Church Hall More images
Church of St Gregory	Cheltenham	Church	1859	5 May 1972	SO9457022558; 51°54′06″N 2°04′49″W	1387870	Church of St Gregory More images
Church of St Matthew	Cheltenham	Church	1877–79	14 December 1983	SO9469822503; 51°54′04″N 2°04′42″W	1386868	Church of St Matthew More images
Church of St Paul	Cheltenham	Church	1831	12 March 1955	SO9478823169; 51°54′25″N 2°04′38″W	1387184	Church of St Paul More images
Church of St Peter	Cheltenham	Parish church	1847–48	12 March 1955	SO9385523361; 51°54′31″N 2°05′27″W	1388006	Church of St Peter More images
Church of St Philip and St James with attached walls and gates	Cheltenham	Church	1879–82	14 December 1983	SO9444221120; 51°53′19″N 2°04′56″W	1245772	Church of St Philip and St James with attached walls and gates More images
Church of St Stephen	Tivoli	Church	1873–74	14 December 1983	SO9388521380; 51°53′27″N 2°05′25″W	1387915	Upload Photo
Church of the Holy Trinity	Cheltenham	Church	1820–23	12 March 1955	SO9517822772; 51°54′12″N 2°04′17″W	1387583	Church of the Holy Trinity More images
Claremont Lodge	Cheltenham	Apartment	c.1800–10	12 March 1955	SO9475321845; 51°53′42″N 2°04′40″W	1387123	Claremont Lodge More images
Clarence House and attached railings	Cheltenham	Villa	1830–34	12 March 1955	SO9456622046; 51°53′49″N 2°04′49″W	1387687	Upload Photo
Evelyn Terrace, Lansdown Terrace, Evelyn Court, Regan House, attached railings and mews archway	Cheltenham	Apartment	c.1832	12 March 1955	SO9413522011; 51°53′48″N 2°05′12″W	1103835	Evelyn Terrace, Lansdown Terrace, Evelyn Court, Regan House, attached railings and mews archway
Francis Close College: Old Practising School	Cheltenham	School	1854–58	5 May 1972	SO9462423128; 51°54′24″N 2°04′46″W	1387896	Francis Close College: Old Practising School
General Hospital (central block) and attached railings	Cheltenham	Hospital	1848	5 May 1972	SO9513721512; 51°53′32″N 2°04′19″W	1387935	General Hospital (central block) and attached railings More images
George Hotel (nos 41–49) and attached railings to Nos 29–39 and 43–49	Cheltenham	House	c.1837–45	12 March 1955	SO9449722299; 51°53′57″N 2°04′53″W	1387846	George Hotel (nos 41–49) and attached railings to Nos 29–39 and 43–49 More images
Gloucester Lodge (No 129) Sherborne Lodge (No 131) gate piers and gates	Cheltenham	Villa	1833–34	12 March 1955	SO9458422070; 51°53′50″N 2°04′48″W	1387686	Gloucester Lodge (No 129) Sherborne Lodge (No 131) gate piers and gates
Lansdown Road (terrace) and attached area railings with wall at left	Cheltenham	Apartment	1825–35	5 May 1972	SO9406521762; 51°53′40″N 2°05′16″W	1245385	Upload Photo
Lansdown Place (terrace) and Montpellier Court and attached railings	Cheltenham	Apartment	1825–35	5 May 1972	SO9420521785; 51°53′41″N 2°05′08″W	1245384	Upload Photo
Lypiatt Terrace and balustrades; area railings to Nos 3 and 6	Cheltenham	Terraced house	c.1847	5 May 1972	SO9422821677; 51°53′37″N 2°05′07″W	1245263	Upload Photo
Masonic Hall	Cheltenham	Freemasons hall	1818–23	12 March 1955	SO9505222602; 51°54′07″N 2°04′24″W	1387563	Masonic Hall More images
Montpellier Arcade and attached gates	Cheltenham	Apartment	1831–32	12 March 1955	SO9450921976; 51°53′47″N 2°04′52″W	1245181	Montpellier Arcade and attached gates More images
No 81, Montpellier Crescent and attached railings	Cheltenham	House	c.1825	5 May 1972	SO9468521652; 51°53′36″N 2°04′43″W	1387337	Upload Photo
Nos 1–13, Imperial Square with attached area railings throughout and pier to No 1	Cheltenham	Terrace	c.1834	12 March 1955	SO9479422118; 51°53′51″N 2°04′37″W	1104370	Nos 1–13, Imperial Square with attached area railings throughout and pier to No 1 More images
Nos 14–34, Imperial Square and attached railings	Cheltenham	Terrace	c.1834	12 March 1955	SO9476421977; 51°53′47″N 2°04′39″W	1104372	Upload Photo
Nos 1–18, Royal Crescent and attached area railings	Cheltenham	Apartment	c.1806–10	12 March 1955	SO9465322388; 51°54′00″N 2°04′45″W	1387817	Nos 1–18, Royal Crescent and attached area railings More images
Nos 1–23, Lansdown Parade and attached area railings	Cheltenham	Terrace	1838–41	12 March 1955	SO9384921828; 51°53′42″N 2°05′27″W	1333176	Nos 1–23, Lansdown Parade and attached area railings
Nos 2–12, Lansdown Crescent and attached railings	Cheltenham	Apartment	Completed by c.1850	12 March 1955	SO9418621856; 51°53′43″N 2°05′09″W	1333172	Upload Photo
Nos 13 to 47, Lansdown Crescent and attached area railings	Cheltenham	Apartment	1831–38	12 March 1955	SO9398921829; 51°53′42″N 2°05′20″W	1333173	Nos 13 to 47, Lansdown Crescent and attached area railings
Nos 1–23, Montpellier Walk and Hanover House (National Westminster Bank)	Cheltenham	Apartment	c.1836–45	12 March 1955	SO9445321911; 51°53′45″N 2°04′55″W	1387359	Nos 1–23, Montpellier Walk and Hanover House (National Westminster Bank)
Nos 47 to 83, Promenade and attached railings with low walls and end piers to Nos 71 and 73	Cheltenham	House	19th century	12 March 1955	SO9473722305; 51°53′57″N 2°04′40″W	1387631	Nos 47 to 83, Promenade and attached railings with low walls and end piers to Nos 71 and 73 More images
Numbers 99–119, Promenade and attached railings	Cheltenham	Apartment	By 1834	12 March 1955	SO9466822194; 51°53′54″N 2°04′44″W	1387670	Numbers 99–119, Promenade and attached railings More images
Nos 121 and 123, Promenade and attached railings	Cheltenham	Villa	1834–40	12 March 1955	SO9461722115; 51°53′51″N 2°04′47″W	1387684	Nos 121 and 123, Promenade and attached railings
Nos 125 and 127, Promenade and attached railings	Cheltenham	Villa	1834–40	12 March 1955	SO9460122093; 51°53′50″N 2°04′48″W	1387685	Upload Photo
Nos 18–24, Priory Parade and attached railings	Cheltenham	Apartments	c.1820–30	12 March 1955	SO9545721968; 51°53′46″N 2°04′03″W	1104398	Nos 18–24, Priory Parade and attached railings More images
Oriel Terrace Nos 1–4 with mews arch and attached railings	Cheltenham	Terrace	1826	12 March 1955	SO9496022024; 51°53′48″N 2°04′29″W	1387383	Upload Photo
Oxford Parade and attached railings	Cheltenham	Apartment	c.1780–1820	12 March 1955	SO9548321947; 51°53′46″N 2°04′01″W	1104401	Oxford Parade and attached railings
Oxford Parade and attached railings	Cheltenham	Apartment	1816–17	12 March 1955	SO9552121914; 51°53′45″N 2°03′59″W	1103817	Oxford Parade and attached railings
Parish Centre for St Philip and St James	Cheltenham	Parish hall	1830	12 March 1965	SO9458121608; 51°53′35″N 2°04′49″W	1387994	Parish Centre for St Philip and St James More images
Queens Hotel	Cheltenham	Hotel	1838	12 March 1955	SO9457421980; 51°53′47″N 2°04′49″W	1387698	Queens Hotel More images
Nos 1–6, St Margaret's Terrace and attached area railings	Cheltenham	Apartment	1820–25	12 March 1955	SO9503522734; 51°54′11″N 2°04′25″W	1387881	Nos 1–6, St Margaret's Terrace and attached area railings
St Paul's College Cheltenham and Gloucester College of Higher Education	Cheltenham	Further education college	1849	12 March 1955	SO9462623044; 51°54′21″N 2°04′46″W	1387995	St Paul's College Cheltenham and Gloucester College of Higher Education
Synagogue	Cheltenham	Synagogue	1837–39	5 May 1972	SO9455422416; 51°54′01″N 2°04′50″W	1387877	Synagogue More images
Trident House (No 27a) and attached railings to Nos 15–21 and 27	Cheltenham	Terrace	1837–40	12 March 1955	SO9458722269; 51°53′56″N 2°04′48″W	1387845	Upload Photo
Nos 1–2 Suffolk Square, No 1 Willoughby and attached area railings to Nos 2–12	Cheltenham	Apartments	1832–48	12 March 1955	SO9451221657; 51°53′36″N 2°04′52″W	1387971	Nos 1–2 Suffolk Square, No 1 Willoughby and attached area railings to Nos 2–12 More images

== See also ==
- Grade II* listed buildings in Gloucestershire
  - Grade II* listed buildings in Cotswold (district)
  - Grade II* listed buildings in Forest of Dean
  - Grade II* listed buildings in Gloucester
  - Grade II* listed buildings in South Gloucestershire
  - Grade II* listed buildings in Stroud (district)
  - Grade II* listed buildings in Tewkesbury (borough)
- Grade I listed buildings in Cheltenham
