= Peter Harkness =

British media entrepreneur and investor (born 1949)

- Born: Peter Martin Harkness; May 1949 (age 76)
- Occupations: Entrepreneur and Investor

Peter Martin Harkness (born May 1949) is a British media entrepreneur and investor. A former journalist, he is as of May 2023 a director of the business data specialist GlobalData plc.

== Early life ==
Peter Martin Harkness was born in May 1949.

== Career ==
After a 15-year spell as a journalist in the West Midlands, Harkness became deputy editor of the Sunday Mercury when he switched to newspaper management. He became managing director of the London Newspaper Group after acquiring it from Yattendon Investment Trust in a 1985.

Harkness joined media company Magicalia in the early 2000s and led management teams which acquired and sold a series of media companies, including the Butler Group, which was sold to Datamonitor for £11 million; the Midlands magazine group WHY Publications, sold to the Daily Mail group for £14 million; and Precise Media, sold to Phoenix Equity Partners for £42 million.

In 2006, he co-founded, with Owen Davies, the publishing and e-commerce group MyTime Media Ltd.

In 2009, concerned at the continuing dominance of privately educated pupils from the South of England being accepted at Oxbridge colleges, Harkness and his wife Sarah founded a series of bursaries and prizes to encourage applicants from Yorkshire and the North East to apply for places at Mansfield College, Oxford University. This initiative was in support of Mansfield's "Widening Access" campaign, through which the college had by 2019 seen the percentage of state school pupils admitted to Mansfield rise to 96.1%.

Harkness served as a trustee of York Museums Trust from 2010 to 2014. He served as chairman of The Cheltenham Trust, an arts charity that manages five iconic arts, performance and leisure venues in Cheltenham, from 2014 to 2020. As of November 2021, he has been a trustee for Cogges Heritage Trust.

He retired after nine years as chairman of the listed investment fund, Chrysalis VCT in October 2017. He resigned his chairmanship of MyTime Media on 28 February 2018.

As of May 2023 Harkness is director of the business data specialist GlobalData plc.
