= Wyman's Brook =

District of Cheltenham, England

Wymans Brook is a district in the north-west of Cheltenham, Gloucestershire, England, named after the small river which flows through the district. It is situated relatively close to Cheltenham racecourse, Pittville Park, the Prince of Wales Stadium/ Leisure @ Cheltenham and the area of Cheltenham known as "Swindon Village".

== Overview ==
The brook itself is dammed at Pittville to form an ornamental lake, and partly culverted as it flows through the district. In 2006 investigation revealed that the brook was suffering from increasing pollution from the Marle Hill landfill site (now a golf course). Before the brook becomes Pittville Lake, it flows through Whaddon (another area of Cheltenham). This is why a road adjoining the Cheltenham Town football ground is called "Wymans Road". After this, the brook goes on to flow through the residential area of Pittville, and under "Overbrook Drive". Following this, it flows along the bottom of Pittville School's front playing field and into Pittville Park where it becomes the lake as mentioned previously. After the brook leaves the area of Wymans Brook, it flows through some small industrial units on "Wymans Lane" and along the edge of Swindon Village Park, situated in the Swindon Village area of Cheltenham, and out into countryside.

Before the area of Wyman's Brook was developed, as with a lot of Cheltenham, it was open fields and orchards.

The majority of houses on Wymans Brook are privately owned and were built in the 1970s. The main road running through the estate is "Windyridge Road". Some of the smaller roads at the end closest to Cheltenham Racecourse, were named after race horses. Names of roads include "Arkle Close" and "Golden Miller Road". Some social housing was added to the estate, just off "Windyridge Gardens", in the 1990s. These houses were built on part of the Midwinter allotment site, therefore, the newer road is named "Midwinter Gardens".

== Railway Past ==
The old (and former) Honeybourne Line, which runs along one edge of Wymans Brook, once passed by here but was taken up in the late 1970s, before the houses of the area were built.

The former trackbed of the line is now used as a cycle track in part. This track if followed in one direction, from Wymans Brook, leads to Hunting Butts Tunnel and to a nearby Cheltenham Racecourse railway station, where the line has been reopened by the Gloucestershire Warwickshire Railway. This part of the track is still covered with ballast from when it was in use and therefore is not really suitable for cycling on.

If the track is followed from just behind the Prince of Wales stadium, which is at the other end of Wymans Brook, in the opposite direction to the racecourse, it runs along the bottom of the High Street and carries on past the Waitrose supermarket and on up to the Cheltenham Railway Station that is currently in use. This part of the track has been surfaced by the council and is now a useful and busy cycle/footpath for many residents of Cheltenham who can use it to get from the town centre to the swimming pool and sports facilities at "Leisure @ Cheltenham".

There is another railway line which runs along the opposite edge of Wymans Brook which was built by the Birmingham and Gloucester Railway. This is currently in use and is the border between Wymans Brook and the industrial units off "Wymans Lane" and further along the road, "Swindon Village". The line is crossed using an automated level crossing on Swindon Lane. This railway line runs from Cheltenham Spa railway station.

However the GWSR own a further mile of track (through Hunting Butts Tunnel) to only as far as the nearby Prince of Wales sports stadium close by, where a new station may be built and may form the terminus of the line. The short section of trackbed further beyond is now owned by the council and completely surfaced to Cheltenham Spa railway station itself.

== Facilities ==
The facilities in Wymans Brook are located on Windyridge Road. The facilities include a Chinese takeaway, a Pub, a Pharmacy, a Fish & Chip Shop, a Doctors surgery, a dentist's surgery, a window company and a small supermarket. The pub stands separate from the other facilities, it was built in 1979 and was named "The Haymaker", possibly with reference to the fact that the estate was previously fields. In 2007, the pub was refurbished and renamed "The Ridge", a reference to the fact that it stands on "Windyridge Road". The old "Haymaker" sign is displayed next to the bar. The supermarket etc. are in a block of units. The supermarket is a Co-op store which sells groceries etc. The doctors surgery and the dentist's surgery are accessed via a flight of stairs as they are above the Co-op and Chinese takeaway.

Wymans Brook is a very pleasant residential area and close to many facilities including Cheltenham Town Centre and a number of Retail Parks. It is also very close to the Cheltenham Racecourse and adjacent to open countryside and fields.
