= Pittville Pump Room =

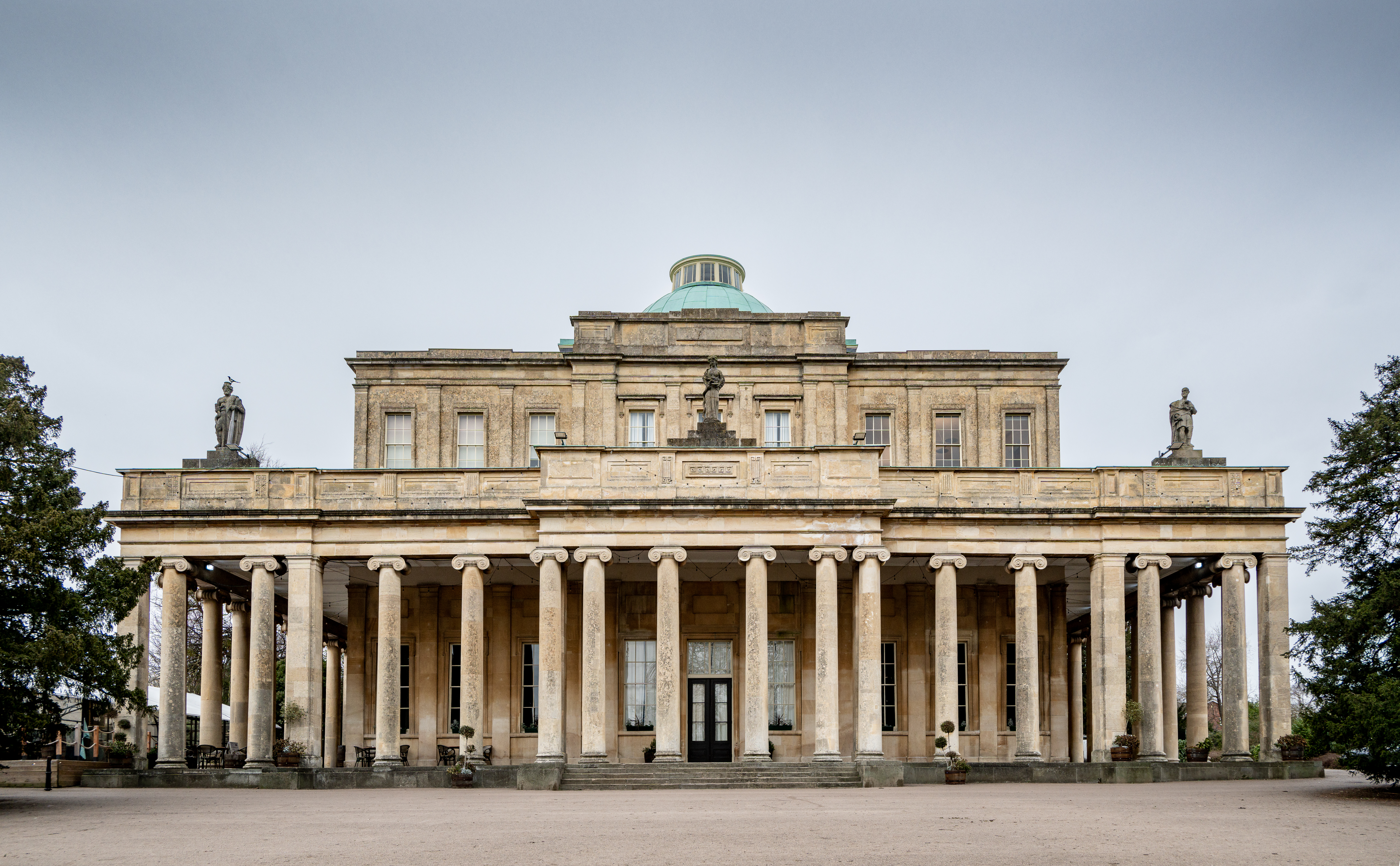
- Interactive map of the Pittville Pump Room area

General information
- Coordinates: 51.912025°N 2.06735°W
- Completed: 1830
- Owner: The Cheltenham Trust

Design and construction
- Architect: John Forbes

Listed Building – Grade I
- Official name: Pittville Pump Room
- Designated: 12 March 1955
- Reference no.: 1387559

The Pittville Pump Room was the last and largest of the spa buildings to be built in Cheltenham.

The benefits of Cheltenham's mineral waters had been recognised since 1716, but not until after the arrival of Henry Skillicorne in 1738 did serious exploitation of their potential as an attraction begin. After the visit to Cheltenham in 1788 of King George III, the town became increasingly fashionable, and wells were opened up at several points round the town. Pittville, the vision of Joseph Pitt, was a planned 'new town' development of the 1820s, in which the centre-piece was (and remains) a pump-room where the waters of one of the more northerly wells could be taken.

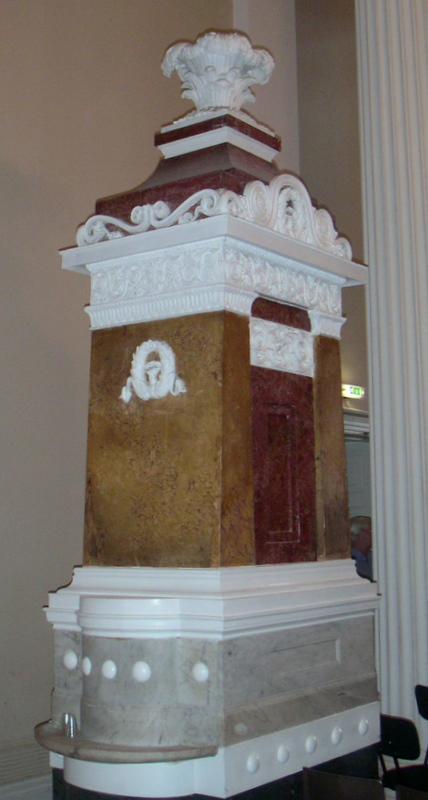
The Pump

The Pump Room was built by the architect John Forbes between 1825 and 1830. It is a Grade I listed building standing at the northern end of Pittville Lawn with landscaped grounds running down to a lake. The building contains the original Pump, made of marble and scagliola, to which the waters are today fed by electric pumping.

The building has a colonnade of Ionic columns; the interior houses a ballroom on its ground floor. Further Ionic columns support a gallery under a dome from which music might be played; on upper floors there were a billiard room, library and reading room. Above the colonnade are three statues, by Lucius Gahagen, erected in 1827, of the goddess Hygieia, Aesculapius and Hippocrates.

The Pump Room and its grounds were managed during the 19th century by a succession of lessees, who offered the typical fare of pleasure gardens including menageries, exhibitions and balloon ascents. However the concession did not prove lucrative. Eventually Pitt himself went bankrupt and in 1890 the Room and the grounds passed into the ownership of the town council.

They are now part of The Cheltenham Trust, a charity which also manages the Cheltenham Town Hall, the Wilson Art Gallery & Museum, the Prince of Wales Stadium and Leisure at Cheltenham - plus the town's Tourist Information Centre which has continued to use them for public events. The Pump Room is frequently used as a concert hall, especially during the Cheltenham Music Festival. At one time the upper floor housed a Museum of Fashion.

Following elections in 2007 the incoming Council discussed the possibility of selling the Pump Room but after widespread protests this proposal was later dropped in favour of a limited privatization which would retain the building's public use.

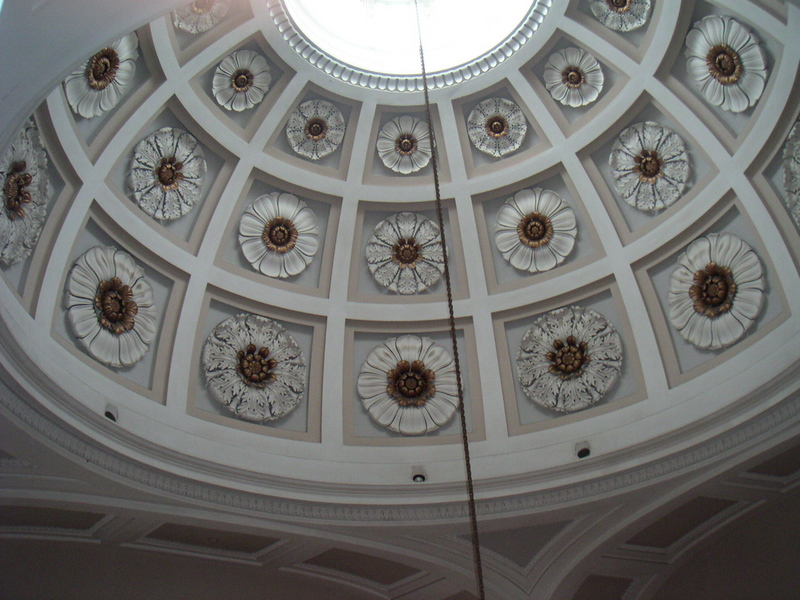
Interior of the dome
