= Pittville =

Residential suburb of Cheltenham, Gloucestershire, England

Coordinates: 51°54′30″N 2°4′0″W

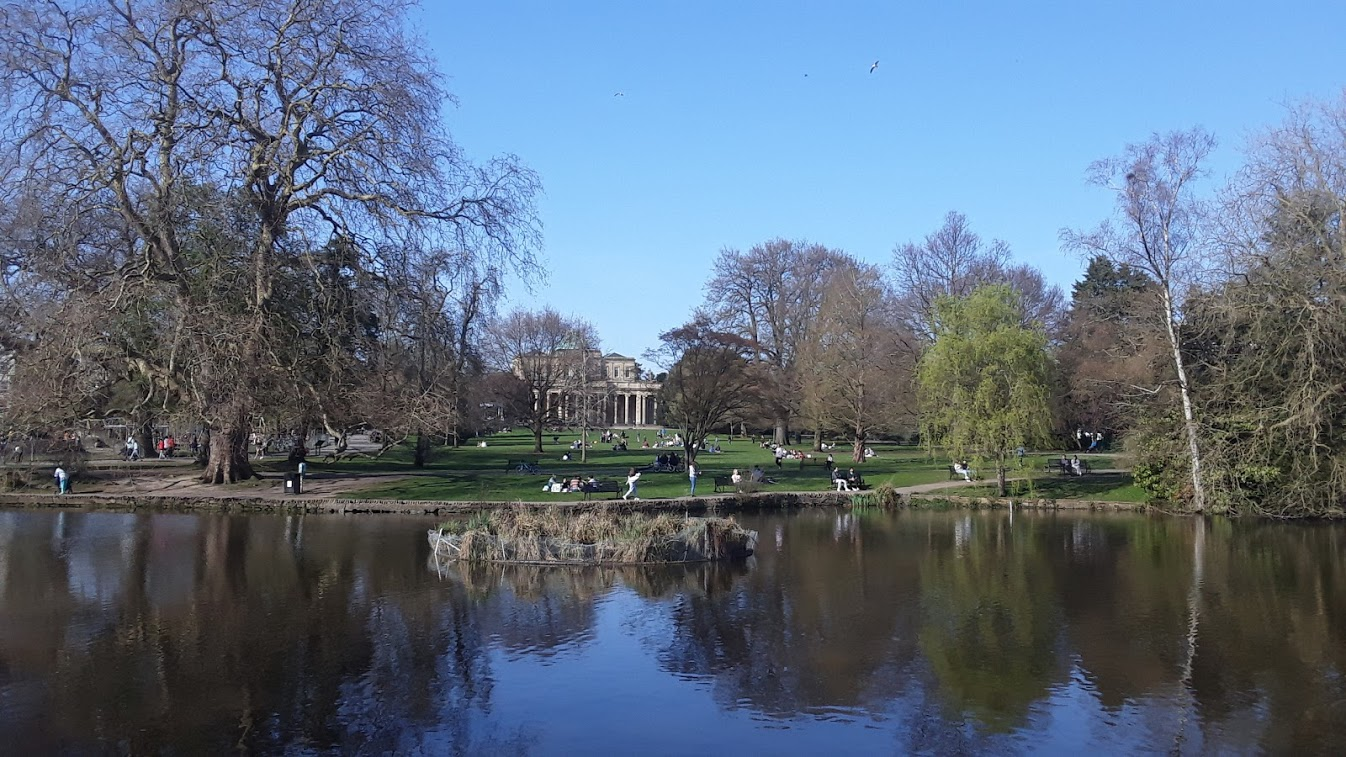
Pittville Park showing the lake and Pump Room

Pittville is a residential suburb of Cheltenham, Gloucestershire, England, founded in the early 19th century by Joseph Pitt. The population of Pittville Ward at the 2011 Census was 5,327. It contains Pittville Park, with its long gardens, two lakes, boat house, three cafes (including the boat house), tennis courts, menagerie, children's play area, 9-hole pitch and putt golf course, and one of Cheltenham's grandest and most celebrated buildings, the Pump Room.

The upmarket tone of the area is set by the architecture: in addition to the Pump Room, Pittville contains some of the finest examples of Regency and Victorian housing in Cheltenham, including many of the town's largest houses. Schools in Pittville include Pittville School (the former Pate's Grammar School for Girls), and the private prep school Berkhampstead School. Gustav Holst's father, Adolph von Holst was organist at All Saints' Church, Pittville.

== History ==
Joseph Pitt, the developer of Pittville, wanted to create a 100-acre (0.40 km^{2}) estate, with its own Pump Room, walks, rides, and gardens and up to 600 houses. Pitt envisaged Pittville as a new spa town, one which would rival the existing fashionable quarters of Cheltenham. Development began in 1824-5. Pitt employed the architect John Forbes, who designed the basic layout of the estate, and most importantly the Pittville Pump Room, which opened on 20 July 1830, and the landscape gardener Richard Ware, who laid out the gardens (now Pittville Park). Other architects employed by Pitt include Robert Stokes.

One notable house in Pittville's history is 'Ellerslie' at 108 Albert Road. In the beginning of the 20th century it was home to Rowena Cade, who after the First World War went to Cornwall and built the Minack Theatre near Land's End, largely with her own hands. 'Ellerslie' has now been converted into apartments. Another house noted for its history is Cotswold Grange in Pittville Circus which now operates as a hotel. Many of the grandest houses in Pittville are close to the park (in Evesham Road, Pittville Lawn and Albert Road), or around separate green spaces (Wellington Square, Pittville Crescent, Pittville Circus).

== Education ==
The University of Gloucestershire has redeveloped its Pittville campus as student accommodation; it is now known as 'Pittville Student Village'.

Pittville School, on Albert Road, Pittville, is a secondary school of approximately 600 pupils.

Dunalley Primary School, on West Drive, Pittville, is a primary school of approximately 400 pupils.

== Leisure ==
=== Pittville Park ===
Pittville Park was created in the second decade of the 19th century by Joseph Pitt as an area of 'walks and rides' for visitors of the Pittville Pump Room, together with many fine and imposing houses as part of the Pittville Estate development, for the rich and famous who came to live in Cheltenham. Pittville Park provides 33ha (82 acres) of parkland, including an ornamental lake with elegant bridges dating from 1827 and a boating lake, formerly known as Capper's Fish Pond. It was named after Robert Capper, owner of Marle Hill House, the grounds of which now constitute the western part of the Pittville Park. The lakes were created by damming a stream known as Wyman's Brook.

Like most of Cheltenham's historic parks and gardens, Pittville Park was originally enclosed by railings, and private to the residents and subscribers to the spa. The park was formally opened to the public on 25 April 1894, a few years after Cheltenham Borough Council had bought the Pittville Estate.

Central Cross Drive café

A refreshment kiosk, or small outdoor café on Central Cross Drive, dating from 1903, used to have unusual terracotta dragons on its roof. It is open throughout the year, with shorter hours in winter and is situated in the Long Garden, a stretch of parkland to the south of Pittville Park facing Pittville Lawn. Very near the café, on the corner of Pittville Lawn and Central Cross Drive, originally stood a small spa called Essex Lodge, erected in the 1820s.

On the west side of Evesham Road is the Boating (or Lower) Lake, with an early Boathouse (not open in winter) which serves ice creams and cold drinks. Row boats and pedal boats can be hired. A metal pedestrian bridge, joining the north and south banks of the Lower Lake, was opened in February 2012. This replaced earlier wooden bridges which had been damaged beyond repair. The bridge is decorated with metal sculptures based on drawings made by local schoolchildren and artists.

Other leisure pursuits include angling, tennis, skateboarding ramps, 9-hole pitch and putt golf course and a modern leisure centre on Tommy Taylor's Lane with a swimming pool and other recreational facilities. An amateur flying trapeze club has a full size flying trapeze rig in the park during the summer, and offers flying trapeze classes - including beginner classes - to the public.

Another attraction in the park are the enclosures which house a variety of birds, chipmunks and rabbits. The bird collection includes: cockatiels, green parrots, canaries, peacocks and chickens.

The play area in the park underwent a major redevelopment during the first part of 2016, reopening on 27 May. The new attractions include a zip wire.

Pittville Park is given a grade 2 listing under the English Heritage register of historic parks and gardens.

There are car parks near the Pump Room that are currently free to use.

=== Gustav Holst Museum ===
The Holst Birthplace Museum (now called Holst Victorian House) was founded by Gustav's daughter, Imogen Holst, in 1974 during centenary ceremonies for Holst's birth. The museum houses a number of mementoes, including the piano on which Holst composed The Planets, as well as pictures, books, some letters and manuscripts. The Holst Victorian House is one of only three composer museums in England. (Note: The others are Handel and Elgar.)

The house consists of eleven rooms, which were furnished from the collections of Cheltenham Art Gallery & Museum. The sitting room shows how a Regency sitting room would have looked in the 1830s. The bedroom is probably the room where Gustav Holst was born and it was furnished in the style of the 1870s. The music room contains many items associated with Holst and his music, notably the oil portrait of the composer from the 1920s and his piano on which much of 'The Planets' and his most famous works were composed. The kitchen and scullery show visitors how Victorian households looked.
