= Robert Stokes (politician) =

New Zealand architect and politician (circa 1810–1880)

Robert Stokes (c.1810 – 20 January 1880) was an English and New Zealand architect and New Zealand politician and newspaper proprietor. Stokes Valley is named after him.

== Early life ==
Stokes was born in England c.1810. Little is known about Stokes' life in England but he is known to have trained as a surveyor and worked as an architect in Cheltenham and London. Stokes is also known to have had his artwork exhibited at the Royal Academy. (Note: Stokes wrote in a letter to the New Zealand Company that he worked for Joseph Pitt.)

== England career ==
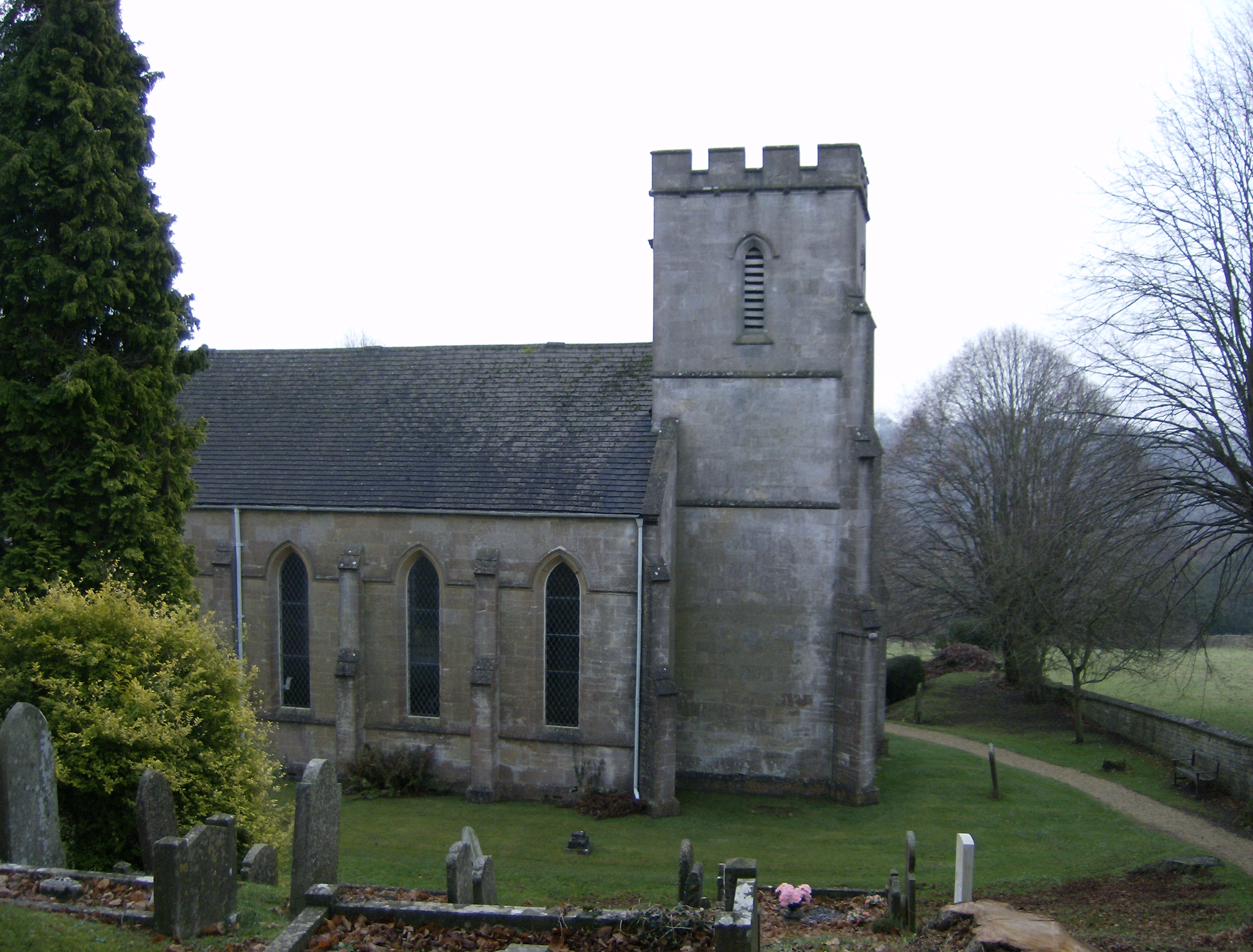
St Bartholomew's Church

From 1832 to March 1835 Stokes worked for Joseph Pitt, designing buildings for Pittville. A notable design of Stokes during this time was Ravenhurst, a grade II listed building.

In 1837 Stokes designed St Bartholomew's Church in Oakridge, Stroud, Gloucestershire.

== New Zealand career ==
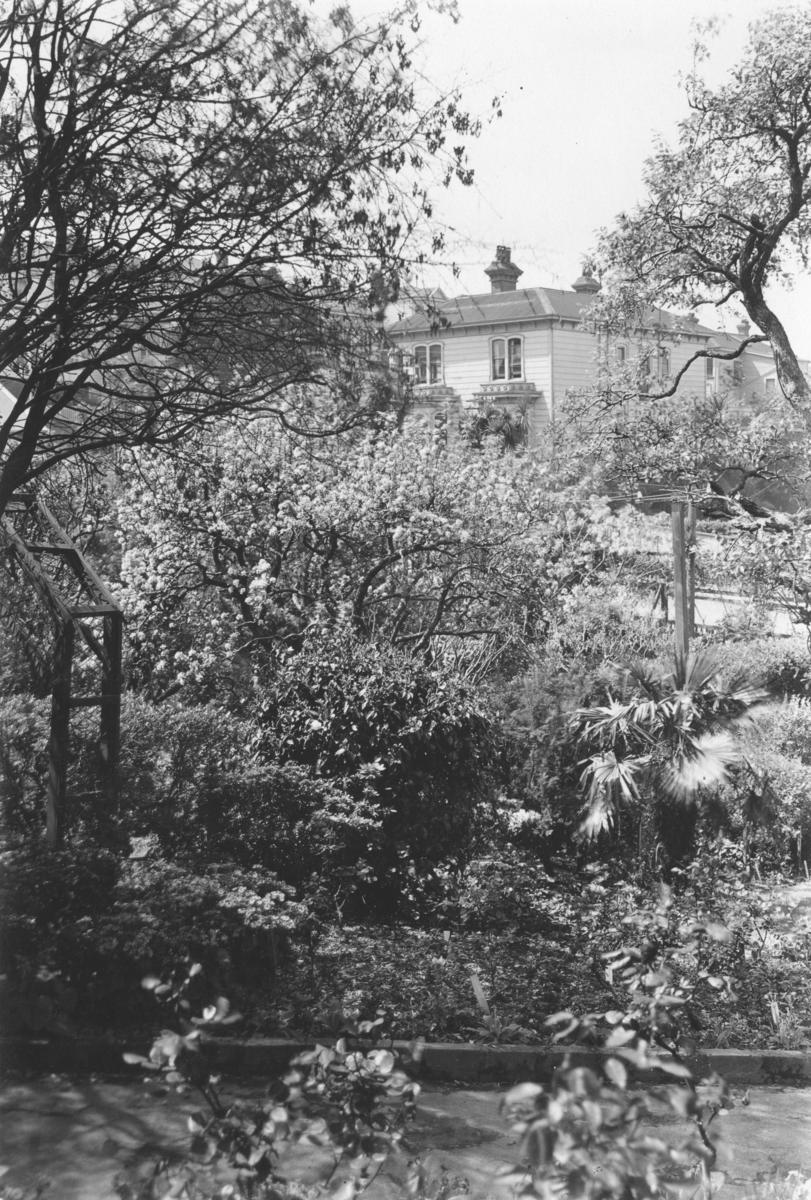
St Ruadhan

Stokes applied for a position with the New Zealand Company 10 April 1839 and was appointed as a survey assistant to William Mein Smith. Stokes arrived in Port Nicholson on 3 January 1840. In his role as survey assistant for the New Zealand Company, Stokes assisted with surveying Wellington, the Hutt Valley, and Whanganui. He also surveyed the Stokes Valley, which is named in his honour. Stokes surveyed the first bridle track through the Rimutaka Ranges (Stokes Track), later serving as the route for Rimutaka Hill Road. After scaling the Rimutakas Stokes noted the agricultural potential of the Wairarapa plains and spread word of such in Wellington, leading to European settlement of the Wairarapa. In 1842 Stokes resigned from his position to start his own architectural and surveying business. Stokes built his home, named St Ruadhan, on Woolcombe Street (now The Terrace). In 1895 Sir Robert Donald Douglas McLean came to own the property. (Note: The property was demolished in 1941 for social housing flats)

After returning from South America in 1843 Stokes founded the New Zealand Spectator & Cook's Strait Guardian with Henry Petre and Charles Clifford. Stokes was the initial editor and later became owner of the paper. Stokes owned his own printing work on Manners Street and published it from there until 1858. Stokes continued to own the paper until 1865. The paper is noted for its staunch support of Governor George Grey.

Stokes' most notable architectural work was the Victorian Free Classical Wesleyan Chapel on Manners Street. The 1848 Marlborough earthquake destroyed the building. Stokes designed the replacement but this was replaced in 1868 with a new building designed by Charles Tringham.

In 1857 Stokes was elected to the Wellington Provincial Council for Wellington City. The following year Stokes carried a bill that granted municipal government for Wellington City. Stokes continued to represent Wellington City until 1865 when he lost the election. Stokes was elected that same year for Wairarapa East. Stokes used his time in government to propose a railway through the Rimutakas, although this was unsuccessful until Julius Vogel's public work schemes. Stokes was a Reformist opposed to superintendent Isaac Featherston.

Stokes was appointed to the New Zealand Legislative Council on 12 July 1862. Stokes remained a member until 24 September 1879, when he was relieved of his membership due to his absence. (Note: Although the Legislative Council appoints members for life they could be removed due to absence and Stokes' return to England resulted in this removal being carried out.)

Between 1858 and 1861 Stokes and his brother John Milbourne acquired extensive holdings in the Hawke's Bay, including the Manganuka and Milbourne stations and several town sections in Clive.

== Personal life and retirement ==
Stokes returned to England in 1878 and settled in Bayswater, Westminster. Stokes died 20 January 1880 without any descendants.

Stokes was a proponent of agriculture and served as treasurer for the Wellington Horticultural and Botanical Society.
