= John Forbes (architect) =

Architect in Cheltenham

John B. Forbes (born 1795?) was an architect in Cheltenham.

He designed the Pittville Pump Room for Joseph Pitt (1825–30) and St Paul's Church (1829–31). Besides the Pump Room, on which he personally worked 1825–28, and St Paul's Church, he is credited with several other buildings in Cheltenham, including 129–131 Promenade, 1–13 Imperial Square, 3 houses in St James Square, Montpellier Villas, 29-37 Pittville Lawn, and Brandon House, Grafton Road. He had difficulty managing the finances of several concurrent speculative developments. In 1835 he was convicted of forgery, having attempted fraud on a business partner: a sentence of transportation was commuted to a short prison term. His architectural career did not recover.

== Personal life ==
He is consistently referred to as 'local' in descriptions of Cheltenham's development in the 1820s-30s, but his origins are currently obscure. He married twice, firstly in November 1821 to Elizabeth Martha Cook, second daughter of the late Charles Cook esq of Kennington Place, London and secondly on 22 July 1838 at Clerkenwell to Mary Ann Poole, eldest daughter of Thomas Poole of Cheltenham. There were four children by the first marriage, at least two of whom died young.
