= Ovum Ltd. =

British market research company

Ovum
- Industry: Research
- Founded: 1982 by Tim Johnson
- Headquarters: London, United Kingdom
- Products: Research; Consulting; Events
- Parent: Informa
- Website: ovum.informa.com

Ovum, now part of Omdia, was an independent analyst and consultancy firm headquartered in London, specializing in global coverage of Telecommunications, Media and Technology.

== History ==
Ovum was created in 1982 by Tim Johnson, a remote working technology journalist at The Sunday Times in London. In 1985, Johnson was joined by four ex-colleagues from Logica (Ron Sasson, David Lewin, Richard Kee and Jules Hewett) and moved into its first office in central London. From this point, it grew rapidly in the telecoms and software sectors, enjoying 16 years of uninterrupted growth, and opening several offices around the world. Jules Hewett was Ovum's longest serving Chief Executive, from 1988 to 1990 and from 1994 to 2001. In 2000, Ovum achieved revenues of £19 million, and made its first acquisition, Richard Holway Limited.

Chris Dines, previously Finance Director, took over as Chief Executive in 2001. Ovum suffered during the tech crash of the early 2000s, but had recovered by the mid-2000s and was able to float on the London Stock Exchange's AIM in March 2006[2].

It was acquired by Datamonitor in December 2006 for £42 million in cash before Datamonitor was itself acquired by Informa in 2007. Despite the company being acquired, the Ovum brand was maintained within the Informa Tech portfolio. The branding was finally withdrawn in February 2020 when Ovum, along with Heavy Reading, IHS Markit Technology and Tractica were rebranded as Omdia

Ovum focused on analysing digital disruption in enterprise, consumer, and service provider infrastructure markets. It offered vertical market research in the following industries: Education, Financial markets, Government, Healthcare, Insurance, Payments, Retail, Retail banking and Utilities. The company was renowned for its business planning and strategy services through its databases tracking technologies adoption of fixed, mobile, TV and Internet services. It had customers in over 200 countries.

== Coverage as media ==
The company has given positive reviews of:

- Scytl in 2013

== Coverage by media ==
Ovum analysts are frequently quoted in the media over various global channels when technology and telecoms news stories are reported.
