= The Cheltenham Trust =

UK charity

The Cheltenham Trust is a registered charity that manages several cultural and leisure venues in the spa town of Cheltenham, Gloucestershire, England.

It manages Cheltenham Town Hall, The Wilson (Cheltenham) the town's Art Gallery and Museum, Pittville Pump Room and Prince of Wales Stadium and the Leisure @ sports centre and swimming complex. Former director of the National Football Museum and director of museums, galleries and archives at Bristol, Julie Finch, was appointed CEO. Founded in 2014 by Cheltenham Borough Council to secure the future of these venues in an era of spending cuts, the trust also has a trading subsidiary which aims to create revenue to support the venues.

The trust is governed by a board of trustees made up of unpaid local volunteers. In February 2017 media entrepreneur Peter Harkness was appointed chairman and Cheltenham's former mayor, Duncan Smith, vice-chairman. In March 2017 the Trust announced its first major improvement project for one of its venues – a £1.5m refurbishment of Leisure @ Cheltenham with debt funding provided by Cheltenham Borough Council.
