= St. Pauls, Cheltenham =

Human settlement in the United Kingdom

Coordinates: 51.901°N 2.077°W

St. Pauls is one of a number of areas of the Cotswold town of Cheltenham, Gloucestershire, England. St. Pauls is home to the Francis Close Hall, a campus of the University of Gloucestershire, St. Paul's Church, and many leisure facilities. Numerous stories exist of the gallows that were once housed there when the area was characterized by fields rather than housing.

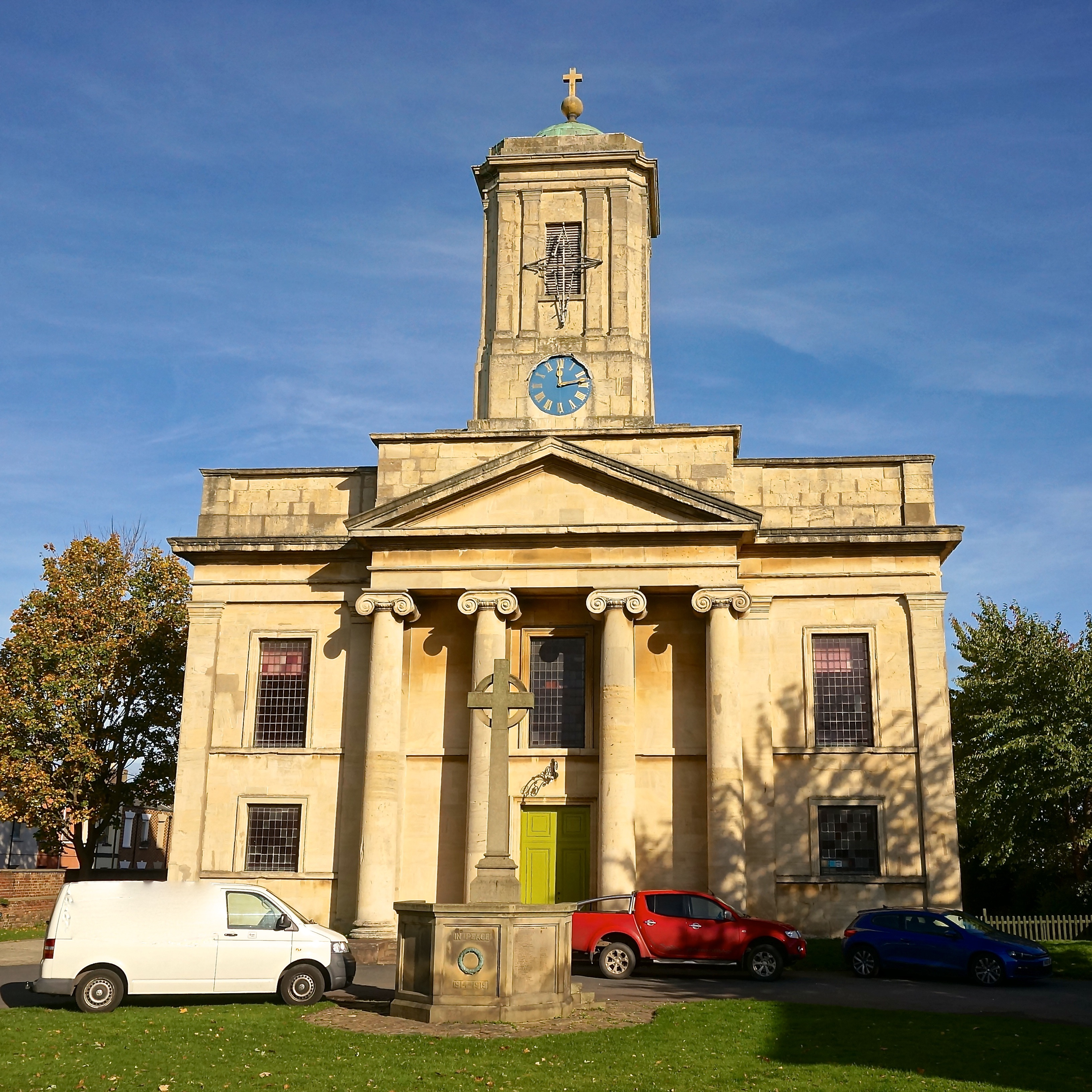
St Paul's Church, Cheltenham

The area of St. Pauls takes its name from St. Paul’s Church at its centre. St. Pauls sits to the north-west of Cheltenham town centre and is a largely residential area of predominantly red-brick artisan housing built in the early 19th century. St. Pauls is located within a short walk of the town centre of Cheltenham, and has a population of approximately 5,500. Examples of the oldest housing in the area can be seen at St. Paul’s Street North, whose stuccoed houses date from the 1830s.

Francis Close Hall, a former teacher training college and now a campus of the University of Gloucestershire, is situated in St. Pauls and has a state-of-the-art studio, laboratory, ICT, Gloucester suite training restaurant and Learning Centre. Francis Close Hall, built in Tudor-Gothic style was constructed in 1849 by Samuel Daukes.

There are numerous leisure facilities located in and nearby St. Pauls. At Pittville Park nearby there are tennis courts, skating ramps and an 18-hole golf course. The park also houses Cheltenham Leisure Centre, which has three swimming pools, a gym and health spa. Prince of Wales Stadium, opposite the leisure centre, houses a running track and rugby field.

The recent Brewery development, in the town's Lower High Street, has brought new life to the area providing leisure activities, such as cinema, various shops and numerous restaurants.
