= The Wilson (Cheltenham) =

Museum in Cheltenham, United Kingdom

Coordinates: 51°54′6.5″N 2°4′46″W

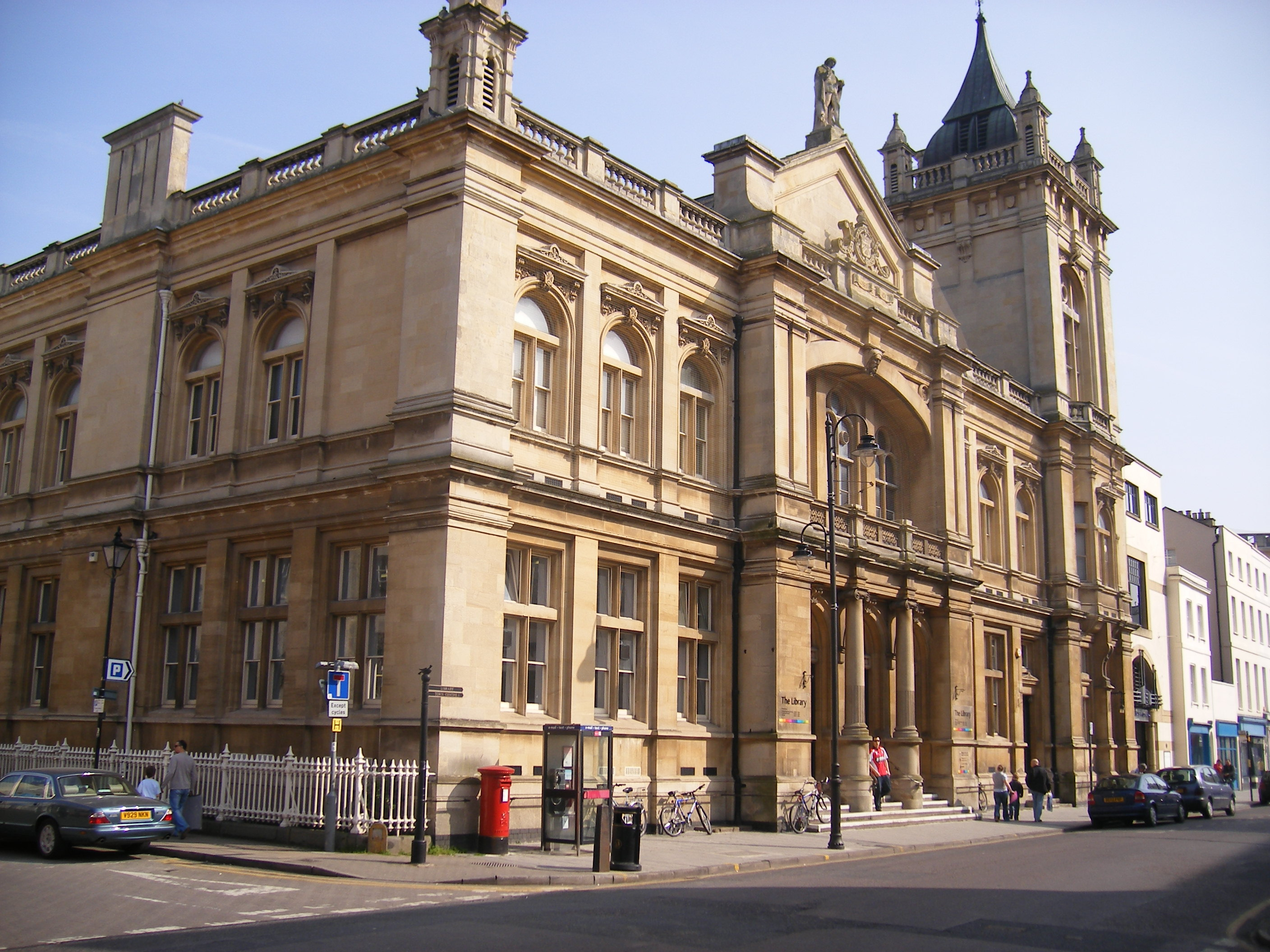
The building of Cheltenham Library which adjoins Cheltenham Art Gallery & Museum

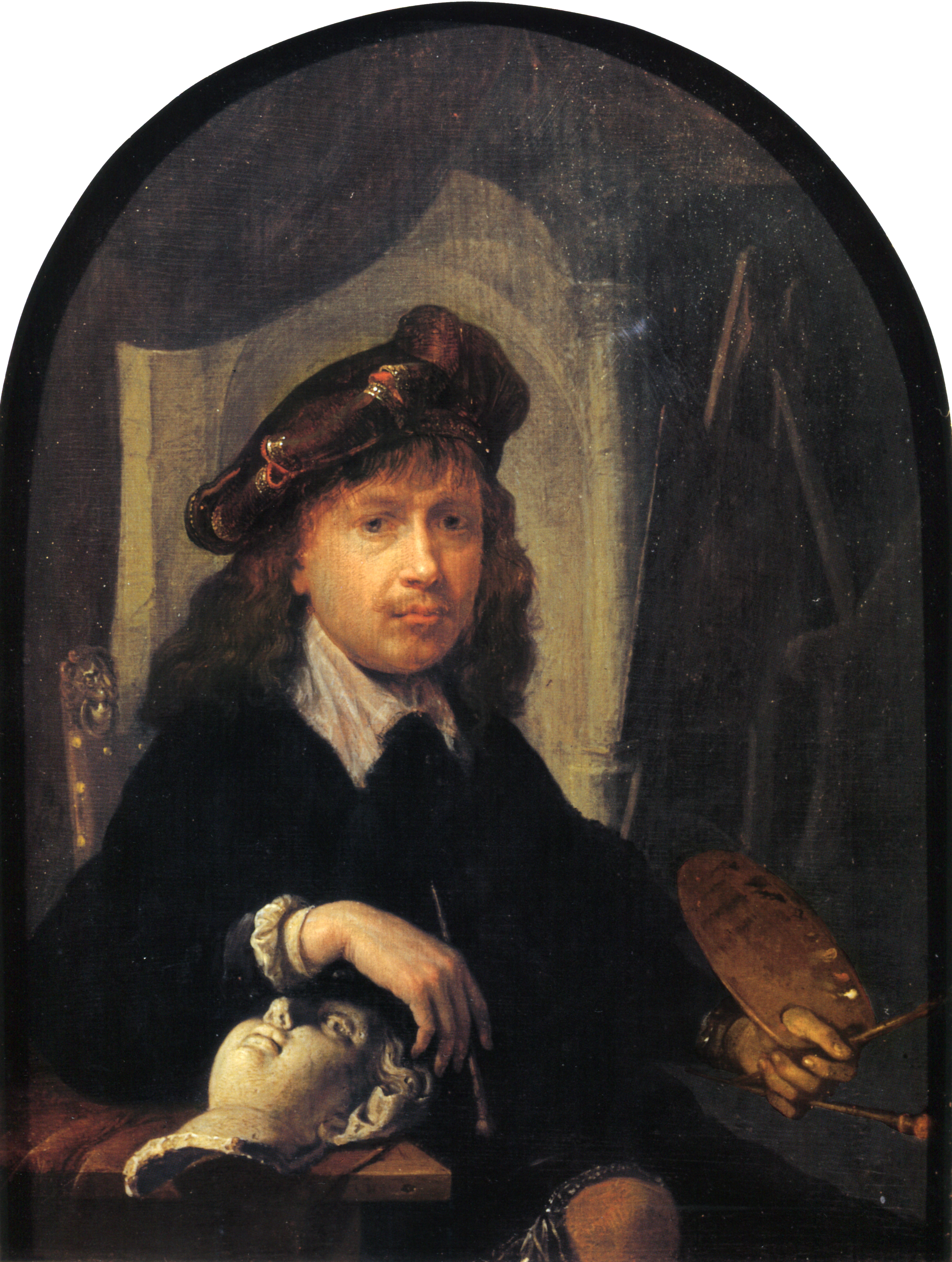
Gerrit Dou, Selfportrait, 1635–8

The Wilson, formerly known as Cheltenham Art Gallery and Museum, in Cheltenham, Gloucestershire, was opened in 1899. It offers free admission, and has a programme of special exhibitions. It was renamed The Wilson in honour of polar explorer Edward Wilson, a son of Cheltenham, in 2013 after the building was extended. The gallery and museum is managed by The Cheltenham Trust.

The museum is housed in part of a Regency building on Clarence Street (Cheltenham Library currently occupies much of the original building), designed as the Cheltenham Public Library by architect William Hill Knight, who also designed the Cheltenham Synagogue and Montpellier Walk.

In 2007 a national architectural design competition was launched by RIBA Competitions to extend the building, providing more space for the renowned Arts and Crafts collection. Through this process Berman Guedes Stretton were selected by Cheltenham Borough Council and the extension was completed in 2012.

Baron de Ferrieres, a former Mayor and Liberal MP for Cheltenham, gave 43 important paintings, mostly from Belgium and the Netherlands, to the town. He also donated £1,000 towards the building of a gallery in which to display them. The Museum was opened in 1907 in the adjacent former Schools of Art and Science. A major extension to the building by Hugh Casson was opened by the Princess Royal in September 1989, where the main entrance to the gallery is now situated.

The museum is particularly noted for its Arts and Crafts collection of furniture, textiles, ceramics, carvings, silver and jewellery which is recognised as an outstanding collection of international importance for which the Art Gallery & Museum has received Designated status.

Cheltenham's history is well represented, and in addition there are paintings spanning four centuries, oriental collections of pottery and costume, and archaeological treasures from the neighbouring Cotswolds.

The Edward Wilson gallery shows the life of the Antarctic explorer who perished with Scott on his expedition to the South Pole in 1912.

In November 2026 the museum reopened its main wing after a four-year refurbishment costing about £600,000 and funded by the National Lottery Heritage Fund.
