= St Mary's Church, Prestbury =

Listed church in England

Church of St Mary, Prestbury
- View of St Mary's Church from the south

- Location within Gloucestershire
- 51.91445°N 2.04514°W
- OS grid reference: SO 96992 23992
- Location: Prestbury, Gloucestershire
- Address: Mill Street, Prestbury, Cheltenham, GL52 3BQ
- Country: England
- Denomination: Church of England
- Churchmanship: Anglo-Catholic / Catholic
- Website: https://www.northchelt.org.uk/ourchurches/st-marys

History
- Status: Parish church
- Dedication: Mary, mother of Jesus

Architecture
- Functional status: Active
- Heritage designation: Grade II*
- Designated: 4 July 1960
- Architect: George Edmund Street (1864 restoration)
- Style: Medieval / Perpendicular Gothic

Administration
- Province: Province of Canterbury
- Diocese: Diocese of Gloucester
- Parish: Prestbury, Gloucestershire

St Mary's Church is a Church of England parish church in Prestbury, Gloucestershire and has been Grade II* listed since 1960.

The earliest identifiable fabric of the building, the west tower, dates from the 13th century. Substantial phases of reconstruction occurred during the 14th century, and then in the 15th century Perpendicular Gothic work was added.

The church was extensively restored by George Edmund Street in 1864–1868 and now remains an active parish church which is part of the North Cheltenham Team Ministry.

== History ==
A priest of Prestbury was recorded in the Domesday Book of 1086, suggesting a church may have existed here at the time of the Norman Conquest; however, the earliest identifiable construction is the west tower which began in the 13th century. Further substantial construction occurred in the 14th century including the north and south aisles and the chancel arch, possibly added to an earlier building. Further perpendicular work continued into the 15th century.

In the 16th century, during the Reformation, complaints were made about the conduct of services at the church. The incumbent vicar, Edmund Lightfoot, had only held "three sermons in seven years" and churchwardens presented that he had simply bought his vicarage.

The church went through an extensive restoration between 1864 and 1868, directed by George Edmund Street. The work was so extensive that it is difficult to determine the precise dates of the surviving medieval fabric of the building. During the restoration both the north and south aisles were extended eastwards, windows were inserted in the south chapel, the north aisle and the chancel, and the roofs were rebuilt.

St Mary's received Grade II* listed status in 1960 because of its substantial medieval construction. In 1980 a celebration for the 700th anniversary of the first named vicar was held, with a reading of the Lesson at service by King Charles III (then Prince Charles). In 2008 the church became part of the North Cheltenham Team Ministry.

== Architecture ==
The church is constructed largely of ashlar with a stone slate roof, with lead roofs over the aisles. It has a nave, north and south aisles, a south porch, a chancel with vestry on the south and an organ chamber on the north.

The 1865 architect ground plan of St. Mary by G. E. Street can be found here: ICBS06232 Prestbury, St. Mary groundplan 1865.

The west tower viewed from the north-west

Of particular note and import is the west tower, as the oldest surviving part of the church. It is four stages high and is strengthened by diagonal supports, and the lower two stages have inset lancet windows. The upper stages contain the bells for the church with belfry windows, and the tower is topped with battlemented parapets and gargoyles.

== Churchyard ==
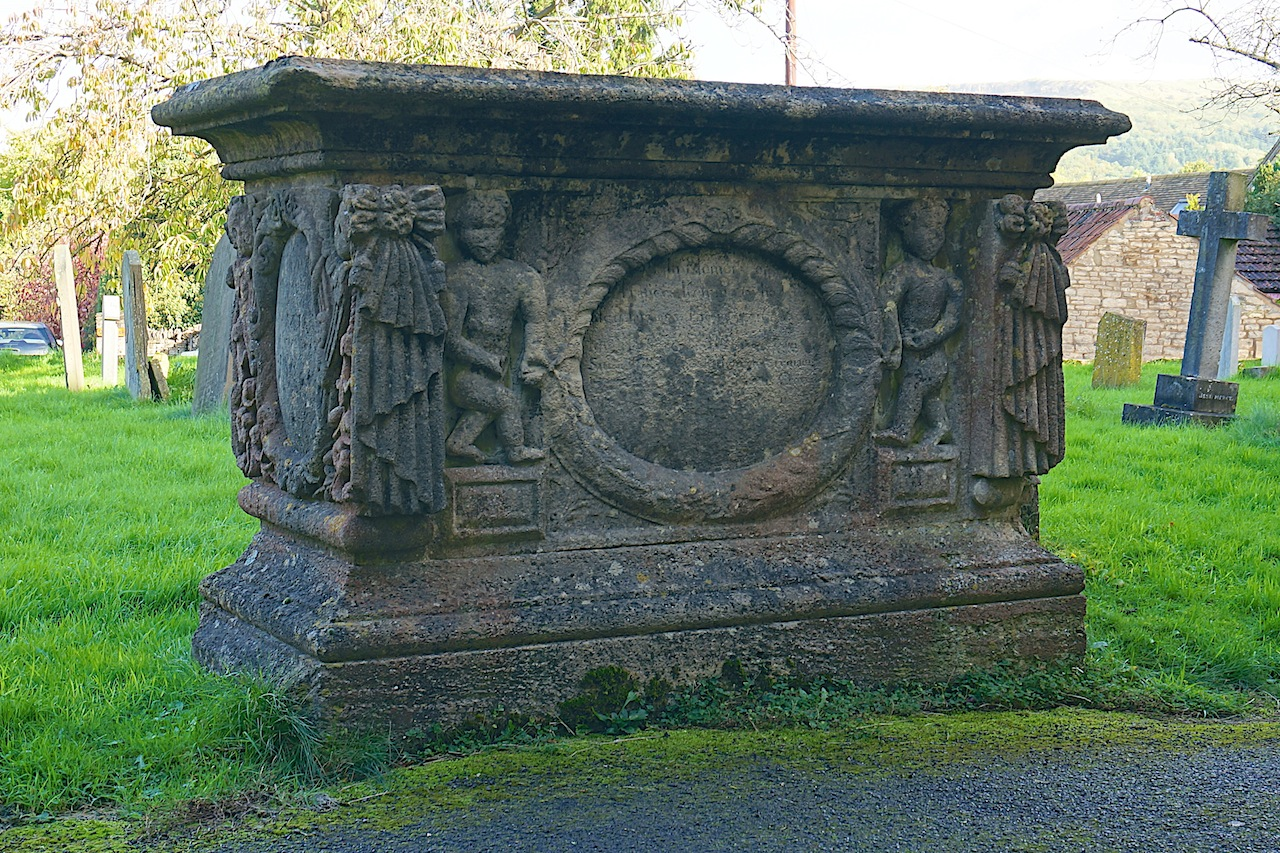
Grade II* listed monument to Francis Kemmet(t), who died in 1716

The churchyard around St Mary's contains several notable monuments including a Grade II* listed monument to Francis Kemmet(t) who died in 1716, noted for being an "unusually bold and rich example" of a chest tomb, a Grade II pair of 17th-century chest tombs and the Allen family monument which is also grade II listed, dedicated to Colonel James Allen, died 1839, and other members of his family.

== Present day ==
St Mary's remains an active Church of England parish church and is one of five churches in the North Cheltenham Team Ministry. The church has a strong catholic tradition with the use of incense and a robed choir, and offers a range of worship from spoken and sung Eucharists, and family worship at the nearby St Mary Primary School.
