= Whaddon, Cheltenham =

Coordinates: 51°54′19″N 2°3′15″W

Whaddon
- Suburb
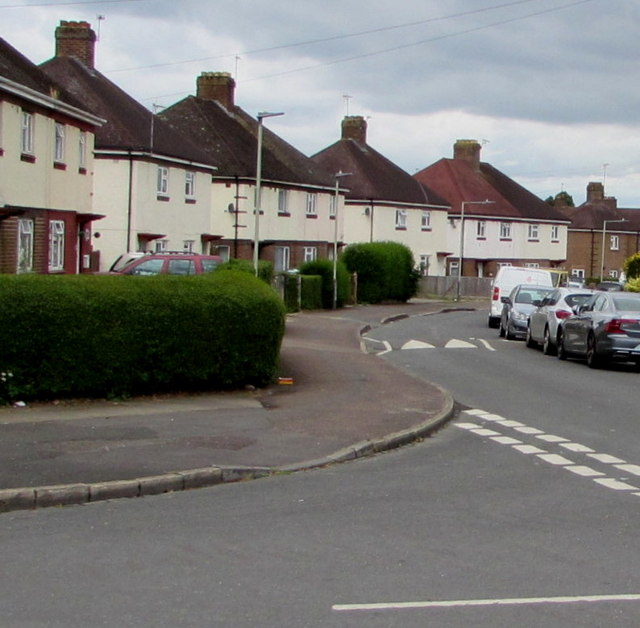
- Clyde Crescent, Whaddon

- Location within Gloucestershire
- OS grid reference: SO963229
- District: Cheltenham
- Shire county: Gloucestershire
- Region: South West
- Country: England
- Sovereign state: United Kingdom
- Post town: CHELTENHAM
- Postcode district: GL52
- Dialling code: 01242
- Police: Gloucestershire
- Fire: Gloucestershire
- Ambulance: South Western
- UK Parliament: Cheltenham

Whaddon is a suburb in the North Eastern part of Cheltenham, Gloucestershire, England. Whaddon consists of council housing built in the 1940s and 50s, making up Whaddon and Lynworth council estates. Whaddon is located less than a mile from Cheltenham town centre. Whaddon Road, the home of Cheltenham Town Football Club (currently playing in the EFL League One) is situated here.

== History ==
Originally agricultural land between the historic village of Prestbury, Gloucestershire and Cheltenham town, Whaddon Farm was purchased by Cheltenham Borough Council in 1935 for the creation of a new housing estate. Housebuilding began with 126 houses in 1935 and a further 162 in 1936.

As well as the housing, the initial plan included a church and a playing field. The Anglican church of St Michael later formed an ecclesiastical partnership with the Whaddon Methodist Church to become the United Church of St Michael with the adjoining Cornerstone Centre.

== Location ==
Clyde Crescent (a large circular park) can be deemed as constituting its geographical centre and is the focus of many community based activities, particularly during the summer. Another centre of community activity are Parklands Community Centre.

Much of Whaddon's housing affords views of the nearby escarpment that surrounds this part of Cheltenham, part of which has been designated by the Countryside Agency as an Area of Outstanding Natural Beauty or AONB.
