= Cheltenham Masonic Hall =

Masonic Lodge in England

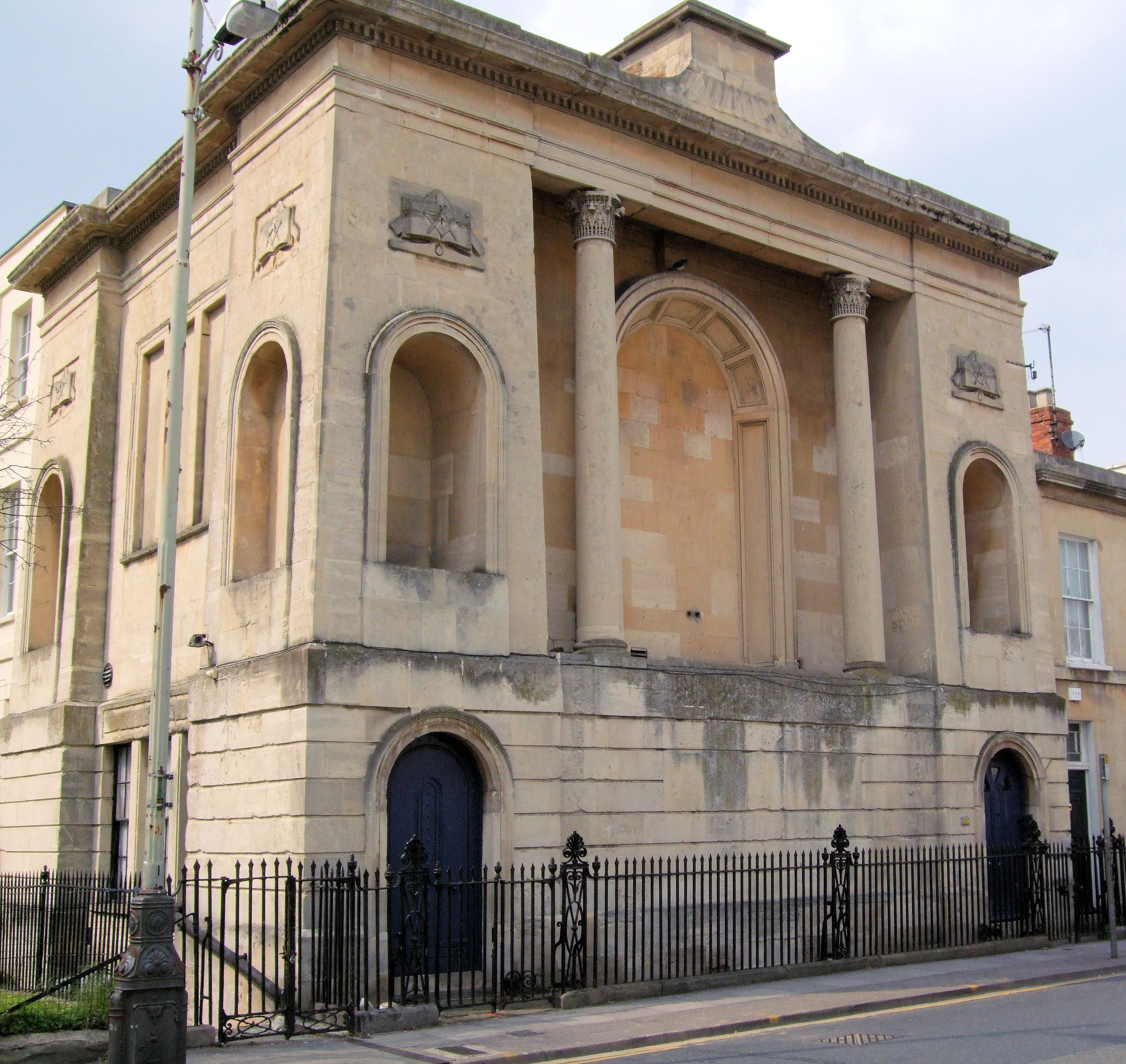
- Interactive map of the Cheltenham Masonic Hall area

General information
- Location: Cheltenham, Gloucestershire, England
- Coordinates: 51°54′07″N 02°04′24″W

Design and construction
- Architect: G. Underwood (Foundation Lodge)

The Cheltenham Masonic Hall built by Foundation Lodge is believed to be the second oldest purpose-built Masonic Lodge in England. Grand Lodge in London did not build a purpose-built lodge room until 1877. It is one of the few Temples in the country which has continuously been used as a Lodge room for considerably over 100 years.

It is also the oldest public building, other than ecclesiastical, in Cheltenham still used for the purpose for which it was designed.

== The building ==
Foundation lodge is one of the world's oldest continuous lodges. It was founded in 1753 and moved to Cheltenham in 1817 and its brethren were responsible for building the magnificent Masonic Hall.

Built in 1823 Cheltenham Masonic Hall was one of the world's first purpose-built Masonic Hall, outside London.

While Cheltenham Masonic Hall has been an integral part of the development and growth of the town since 1823, its early members played an important part in the society which has given the town many of its important institutions and contributed to the town as we know it today. Completed in November 1823 the upper storeys are unusual in that they are built like an Egyptian tomb, with a cant – the sides sloping slightly inwards.

Foundation Lodges Cheltenham Masonic Hall (Original builders and sole users for 34 years), one of the first purpose-built Masonic Halls outside London, was constructed around 1820 for use by Foundation Lodge No 82, by Foundation Lodge member George Allan Underwood, who was initiated into the Foundation Lodge in 1818. He designed many famous buildings in Cheltenham, The Imperial Spa, the buildings now used as the Municipal Offices, the Long Room at Montpellier Spa, Holy Trinity Church and the Lower Assembly Rooms in Bath.

The freehold site, bought for £670 by Sir James Agg-Gardiner MP for Cheltenham, a Foundation Lodge member, was gifted to the Foundation Lodge, and the building of the Masonic Hall, which cost £4,000.00 was financed by selling £25.00 shares. Over the years the building deteriorated mainly due to the dirt and smoke which had accumulated from the fires, candles, smoking and over 180 years of use. A scheme of work was drawn up in 1981 to repair, clean and decorate. Finished in 1984/85 it restored the interior and exterior to its original Regency splendour and included the complete remodelling of the kitchen. Great care is taken to maintain the building in its original state. In 2000 the Lodge Room floor was strengthened and there is a programme of ongoing work to protect the building for many more years.

- Foundation Stone Lodge was established in 1753 by the Stonemasons who built the first Masonic Hall in London. Many Lodges may use a Masonic Hall and presently over 30 Lodges can meet in separate Lodge rooms in Grand Lodge in Great Queen Street in London.
- Our history is illustrated by our emblem of masons laying the foundation stone of a building. Now known as Foundation Lodge it remained in London until 1807 and then moved to Abingdon near Oxford.
- Ten years later it moved to Cheltenham where it was established in the town by about 15 of the town's worthy men who were central to starting many of the organisations which have been responsible for creating the ambiance of Cheltenham.
- Our Lodge number is 82 in the register of the Grand Lodge of England making us one of the oldest lodges in the country; if not the world. In 1820 the 15 brethren of Foundation Lodge decided that they wanted to meet in their own building rather than in one of the town's hotels and set about building their own Masonic Hall.

Over the years many of the towns leading 'personalities' have been Freemasons such as MPs, mayors, solicitors, doctors and a range of professional men. Dr Edward Jenner was a member of the Foundation Lodge.

The Masonic Hall is the only building in Cheltenham, other than ecclesiastical, still used for the purpose for which it was originally designed. Foundation Lodge had been meeting in other premises in the town and held its first meeting here in November 1823. Over 400 Freemasons now meet here, attending 9 lodges and side orders, on a regular basis. After the first 34 years of use, Foundation lodge was joined by the other Cheltenham lodges.

The walls of the Refectory or Banquet Hall were elaborately painted with images of the canopied stalls of the Knights Templar, while at the window end of the same there are canopied recesses with recumbent effigies of Knights. The carving on the mantlepiece bear emblems of the degrees of Malta and the Rose Croix is an especially interesting representation of the Bridge over the River and the Cross with a serpent on the shield; and even the cast iron grate having the Maltese Cross.

Over one door is the Paschal Lamb, the badge of the Knights Templar. Over another is a Bible on a cushion, whilst over the door to the passage is the armour and helmet of a Knight Templar and a motto, "Quis Domine Habitabat."

The ceiling was painted to resemble the lines of a tent, representing the canopy of an encampment. It was removed by Brother C. Rainger after it became defective and dirty. This brother was also responsible for the work of uncovering the paintings on the walls, which were papered over for some twenty years or more.

Once through the original heavy arched timber door, it is best to turn left through the double doors into the dining room.

The painted walls, hung with shields, resemble a Knights Templar encampment and were produced when the lodge was built.

Originally the ceiling resembled a canopy and the room was lit by gas light and candles. This, with up to 60 people smoking cigars and pipes meant that it was not long before it was all obliterated. There is evidence that the walls had been papered over, possibly when it was hired out as a Dancing Academy in the early 1900s. Until heating was installed in 1925 the room was heated by the single fireplace. While the mahogany tables are original new chairs have recently been purchased. The ‘dents’ on the tables were principally caused by the practice of banging special ‘firing’, or ‘toast’, glasses on the table.

The Interior

The steward and caretaker originally lived in attic rooms but, in 1902, an adjoining house was purchased for the Lodge Steward. Originally lit by candles, then gas lamps, electric light was installed in the dining room in 1894 at a cost of 5 guineas and in the hall and other rooms one year later. Central heating was installed in 1925.

On entering the high ceilinged Lodge Room one can immediately appreciate the atmosphere, sense of majesty and quiet dignity which is an important element in our Masonic ceremonies. Designed to accommodate about 65 people the room is lofty but not over large which helps to preserve the family composition of our membership and maintain the close personal relationships between the members. It has none of that impersonality that so often characterises many vast installations in modern times and has been in constant use since 1823.

The decoration is in the high Regency style and, like the rest of the building, no expense was spared when carrying out the original construction. Note the high ceiling covered with a myriad of golden stars on a deep blue background, whilst a golden sunburst conceals the ventilator opening in the centre. Immediately below the ceiling runs a decorative frieze of Graeco-Roman floral design known as the Anthemion. This is a representation of honeysuckle, symbolising fidelity, which was a motif much favoured by the Adam brothers in their decoration of some of the great houses in the latter part of the 18th century. The same pattern is in the exquisitely executed wrought-iron work, backed by crimson velvet, which forms the front of the gallery at the west end of the room. There, too, is represented the Lyre, the emblem of music.

Cheltenham Masonic Hall consists principally of a Lodge Room, Dining Room, Robing Rooms, Bar, Kitchen, Library and Museum and a very distinctive spiral staircase. A fully equipped basement kitchen is used by a professional chef to provide food for up to 60 brethren and guests on lodge nights.

The ceiling was raised to accommodate the beautiful ‘gentleman’s’ pipe organ presented to Foundation Lodge in 1832. Believed to date from the late 1700s, it has been recently completely overhauled and, despite its great age, still sounds out boldly to accompany the singing parts of our ceremonies. On the north wall is a beautifully tiled fireplace emblazoned with Masonic emblems in gold. This was the only means of heating the room until central heating was installed. The picture also shows the beautiful ironwork round the organ gallery.

Access to the organ gallery is by a narrow winding staircase in the north-west corner of the room. It is supported by two Ionic pillars seen in the picture; one surmounted by the Celestial and the other the Terrestrial Globe, pointing out Masonry Universal

The Stairs

Turn left out of the dining room and go up the short flight of stairs. To the left is the bar and to the right a robing room. Immediately in front is a spiral staircase with very intricate and beautiful wrought ironwork. On the left at the top of the stairs is a further robing room, to the right - an ante room leading to the library and museum. The door immediately in front leads into the Lodge Room.

At the East end of the Lodge room is a dais on which sits the Master's chair, surmounted by a crimson canopy, draped and tasselled, which was erected in 1834. Foundation's original Master and Senior and Junior Warden's fine mahogany chairs were presented by various members around 1825. These are placed either side of the present Master's chair, for distinguished visitors. These chairs were superseded by the magnificent gilded, throne-like, chairs brought by Royal Union Lodge in 1830 when they came to meet in the Hall, the first Lodge to do so after the opening by Foundation Lodge. The magnificent chair in the picture is the Senior Wardens chair. The Worshipful Masters chair is under the canopy in the picture above.

The present seating, which was obtained from a redundant church in Somerset, replaced the original benches as they became very unstable at the time of the restoration of the building. Nevertheless, they are almost contemporaneous with the building, having been made in 1840. The centre carpet is traditional Masonic black and white squares surrounded by a pale blue, plain, carpet. This colour is carried up onto the walls above the lower wall portion of deep red which forms a backing to the lighter colour of the seats. A Victorian version of the honeysuckle frieze separates the two colours. Note that almost the entire wall space is covered with Honours Boards upon which are inscribed, annually, the name of the Master or Head of the specific order.

Honours Board

The honours boards of Foundation Lodge, date back to 1817. and contain the names of many distinguished gentlemen who have been the Worshipful Master of Foundation Lodge, many of them the patrons of the many activities and buildings of Cheltenham.

== Site ==
The site of the Masonic Hall must have been an important one in 1818, the price paid by members of Foundation Lodge for it was considerable. Originally the building stood independently in the large garden, but the area has been built up. The existing garden is now surrounded by a box tree hedge and an old acacia tree.

== The Lodge Furniture ==
The building has many old and valuable pieces of furniture contained in the Lodge. The Worshipful Masters, Senior and Junior Wardens chairs in the regular use of all the Lodges are the property of the Royal Union. They are of similar, though not identical design and are fine examples of Georgian craftsmanship apart from their Masonic interest.

The Worshipful Master's chair has two Corinthian columns and is decorated with four plumb rules on the several faces of the legs, but it is also decorated with the square and compasses and on the back the open book of the sacred word, square and compasses and the level and plumb rule. Surmounting the columns were two globes, now gone, and at the back is the mark of a support for a lantern which is now removed. On the top of the ornament over the back is a Royal Crown which has been added on at a later date. This crown implies that the chair was in use for the Royal Arch Degree, or it may refer to the Lodge being a "Royal" Lodge.

The Senior Warden's Chair has some delicate little emblems introduced in the carving – the Fellow Craft tools and the Senior Warden level, in a supporting ribbon.

The Junior Warden's Chair has been broken and a new top of a different style added on, containing a group of tools. The two columns supporting the back are unfluted and were Ionic columns, but the capitals are broken, whilst the upper parts have gone. The ornaments on the legs are of the plumb rule as in the W.M.'s chair.

There is also a set of five chairs of simple mahogany with badges for W.M., S.W., J.W. and two P.M.'s. The two beautiful little Chippendale pattern chairs generally used by the Deacons, are more recent gifts, were not made for Masonic Lodges, but were gifts of Brother John Waghorne.

The organ was given to the Lodge around 1833, and the Lodge roof was raised to accommodate it. It is played for masonic ceremonies on average 4 times per week and is still considered a good instrument.

At the East end of the Lodge room is a dais on which sits the Master's chair, surmounted by a crimson canopy, draped and tasselled, which was erected in 1834. Foundation's original Master and Senior and Junior Warden's fine mahogany chairs were presented by various members around 1825. These are placed either side of the present Master's chair, for distinguished visitors. These chairs were superseded by the magnificent gilded, throne-like, chairs brought by Royal Union Lodge in 1830 when they came to meet in the Hall, the first Lodge to do so after the opening by Foundation Lodge. The magnificent chair in the picture is the Senior Wardens chair. The Worshipful Masters chair is under the canopy in the picture above.

The present seating, which was obtained from a redundant church in Somerset, replaced the original benches as they became very unstable at the time of the restoration of the building. Nevertheless, they are almost contemporaneous with the building, having been made in 1840. The centre carpet is traditional Masonic black and white squares surrounded by a pale blue, plain, carpet. This colour is carried up onto the walls above the lower wall portion of deep red which forms a backing to the lighter colour of the seats. A Victorian version of the honeysuckle frieze separates the two colours. Note that almost the entire wall space is covered with Honours Boards upon which are inscribed, annually, the name of the Master or Head of the specific order.
