= Cheltenham Synagogue =

Orthodox synagogue in Cheltenham, England

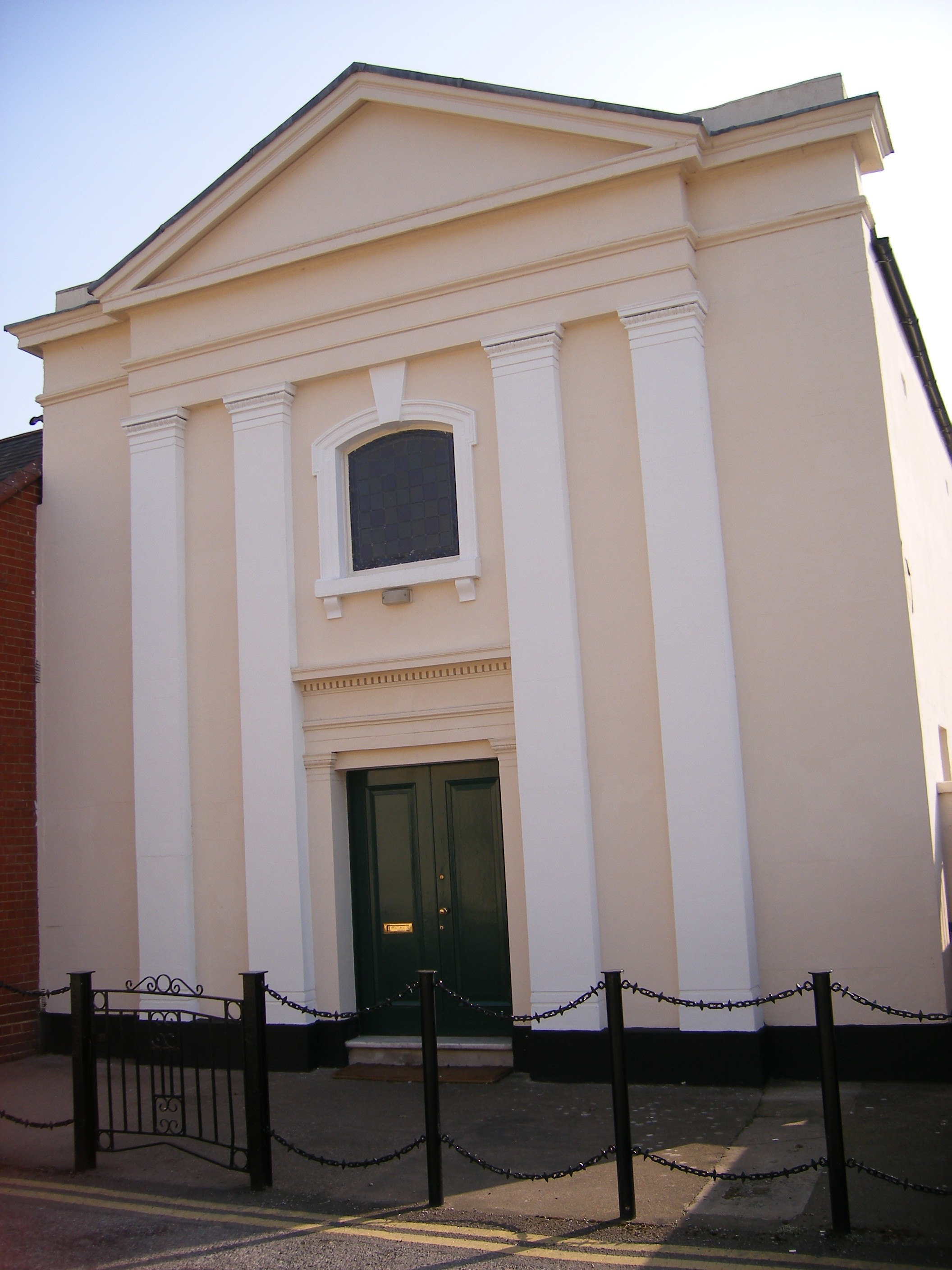
- The façade of the Cheltenham Synagogue

- Location of the synagogue in Gloucestershire

Religion
- Affiliation: Orthodox Judaism
- Rite: Nusach Ashkenaz
- Ecclesiastical or organizational status: Synagogue
- Leadership: Lay-led
- Status: Active

Location
- Location: Synagogue Lane, St James's Square, Cheltenham, Gloucestershire, England GL50 3PU
- Country: United Kingdom
- Interactive map of Cheltenham Synagogue
- Coordinates: 51°54′01″N 2°04′50″W

Architecture
- Architect: William Hill Knight
- Type: Synagogue architecture
- Style: Regency
- General contractor: Mr Hastings
- Established: 1820 (as a congregation)
- Completed: 1839
- Dome: One

Website
- cheltenhamsynagogue.org.uk

Listed Building – Grade II*
- Official name: Synagogue, St James's Square
- Type: Listed building
- Designated: 4 May 1972
- Reference no.: 1387877

The Cheltenham Synagogue is an Orthodox Jewish congregation and synagogue, located on Synagogue Lane in St James's Square of Cheltenham, Gloucestershire, England, in the United Kingdom. The congregation was formed in 1820 and worships in the Ashkenazi rite.

The synagogue building was completed in 1839, designed by William Hill Knight in the Regency style. Assessed in 1951 as one of the architecturally "best" non-Anglican ecclesiastical buildings in Britain, the synagogue was listed as a Grade II* building in 1972 as "an outstanding example of a small provincial English synagogue".

== History ==
The congregation first met in around 1820 in a hired space at the St George's Place entrance to Manchester Walk. The cornerstone for the synagogue was laid on 25 July 1837. It was founded when Cheltenham was a popular spa town. However, the synagogue declined with the town and closed in 1903. It reopened in 1939 to serve as an evacuation centre for those who were being rehoused from London, refugees from Nazi-occupied Europe, and soldiers stationed in nearby bases, including a number of Americans.

== Architecture ==
The elegant Regency building was designed by architect William Hill Knight (1837–9), who also designed the Cheltenham Public Library, now 'The Wilson' (formerly Cheltenham Art Gallery and Museum), and Montpellier Walk.

The synagogue's chaste Regency facade features Doric pilasters and a pediment. The interior features a coffered saucer dome – a typically Regency feature. At the centre of the dome is a lantern made by Nicholas Adam which provides natural light. The Georgian Torah ark and bimah are reused elements of the London New Synagogue in Leadenhall Street from 1761. That congregation was in the process of constructing a new building, which was dedicated in 1838. The cost of wagon freight from London was £86.

A number of unusual elements of the original furnishings survive. Among these are the original rattan upholstery of the pews and bimah seats and the prayer boards. One board has the Yom Kippur prayers and the other has the prayer for the welfare of Queen Victoria. Victoria's name is superimposed over the names of previous British monarchs, the earliest of which is George II.

== See also ==
- History of the Jews in England
- List of Jewish communities in the United Kingdom
- List of synagogues in the United Kingdom
