= Datamonitor =

Market intelligence company

- Company type: Subsidiary
- Industry: Market Intelligence
- Founded: 1989; 37 years ago
- Founder: Mike Danson; Doug Wilson
- Headquarters: London, United Kingdom
- Area served: Global
- Parent: Citeline
- Website: www.datamonitor.com

Datamonitor is an international company providing market intelligence, data analysis, and opinion via a worldwide network of in-house analysts. The company tracks Automotive, Consumer Markets, Energy & Utilities, Financial Services, Logistics & Express, Pharmaceutical & Healthcare, Retail, Technology, Sourcing and Telecommunications markets. Its website claims to have over 6,000 clients, which it helps make strategic and operational decisions. Datamonitor was acquired in 2007 by Informa for £513 million in cash.

== History ==
The company was founded in 1989 by Mike Danson and Doug Wilson, with its first report covering the UK Frozen Food Industry. The company then expanded its coverage to include a number of markets and industries, having secured further business intelligence companies. In 1995, it expanded into the U.S. market by opening an office in New York. In 1999, it opened an office in Frankfurt, Germany, and Hong Kong. In November 2000 Datamonitor went public on the London Stock Exchange.

In 2007, Datamonitor was acquired by Informa (FTSE: INF) in 2007 for £513 million in cash, a surprisingly large amount considering it was "a multiple of more than seven times Datamonitor’s revenue". In 2011, Informa closed down Datamonitor offices in Hyderabad, India, and Dubai, which had been opened in 2006 and 2007, respectively. In February 2015, parent company Informa wrote down Datamonitor's value of by almost 40%, and Informa CEO Stephen Carter said that it was considering selling "some of the 'consumer forecasting' businesses that were part of the Datamonitor deal".

On 27 July 2015 Progressive Digital Media, a business chaired by Datamonitor founder Mike Danson, announced that it had agreed to acquire Datamonitor Financial, Datamonitor Consumer, MarketLine and Verdict businesses from Informa for a combined cash price of £25m. Datamonitor Healthcare and Datamonitor Energy remained businesses of Informa plc.

In 2022, Informa sold its Pharma Intelligence division, including Datamonitor Healthcare, to Warburg Pincus. The business was renamed Citeline. Later in 2022, Citeline was acquired by Norstella.

== Acquired companies ==
- Computerwire (2002)
- Productscan Online (2004)
- eBenchmarkers (2004)
- Butler Research Group (2005)
- Verdict Research (2005)
- Ovum Ltd. (2006)
- Life Science Analytics (2006)
- Brown Wilson Group (2009)
- Packtrack (2010)

Many of the acquired companies continue to have an independent brand presence within Datamonitor.
