= GlobalData =

Data analytics and consulting firm

GlobalData plc
- Type: Public limited company
- Traded as: LSE: DATA
- Industry: Analytics
- Founded: 1999
- Headquarters: John Carpenter House, John Carpenter Street, London, EC4Y 0AN, UK
- Key people: Murray Legg (Chairman); Mike Danson, (CEO)
- Revenue: ▲£322.1 million (2025)
- Operating income: ▲£81.2 million (2025)
- Net income: ▲£50.1 million (2025)
- Website: globaldata.com

GlobalData Plc is a data analytics and consulting company, headquartered in London, England. The company is listed on the London Stock Exchange (LSE) and is a constituent of the FTSE 250 Index.

== Background ==
The company was founded as a London-based provider of online marketing, business information, research and marketing services named TheMutual.net in 1999, and was listed on the Alternative Investment Market in 2000. It changed its name to TMN Group in December 2006.

In December 2007, it acquired Internet Business Group in a £9.8m deal. Four months later, in March 2008, TMN rejected a £40m cash and shares offer from Tangent Communications, another marketing services group. Then in May 2008, two TMN directors, CEO Mark Smith and CFO Craig Dixon, put together a £52.8m management buy-out offer for the business, backed by August Equity. Following the Tangent offer, withdrawn in April 2008, founder and former Datamonitor CEO, Mike Danson had built a 27% shareholding in TMN.

In 2009, TMN was acquired via a reverse takeover by Progressive Digital Media Ltd, and changed its name to Progressive Digital Media Group. Progressive Digital Media had been founded in 2007 as a holding company for a set of media assets purchased from Wilmington plc; it expanded further by a series of acquisitions, purchasing Business Review from Datamonitor PLC in July 2008, followed by SPG Media Group PLC in November 2008.

Progressive Digital Media acquired Current Analysis Inc in 2014.

On 27 July 2015, Progressive Digital Media announced that it had agreed to acquire Datamonitor Financial, Datamonitor Consumer, MarketLine and Verdict businesses from Informa for a combined cash price of £25m.

In January 2016, Progressive Digital Media bought the GlobalData Holding Ltd business and changed its own name to GlobalData Plc.

GlobalData acquired entertainment publisher Media Business Insight (including Broadcast and Screen International) in June 2022.

The company moved from the Alternative investment Market to the main market in March 2026.
