= Prestbury, Gloucestershire =

Village in Gloucestershire, England

Coordinates: 51.913889°N 2.041667°W

Prestbury
- Village
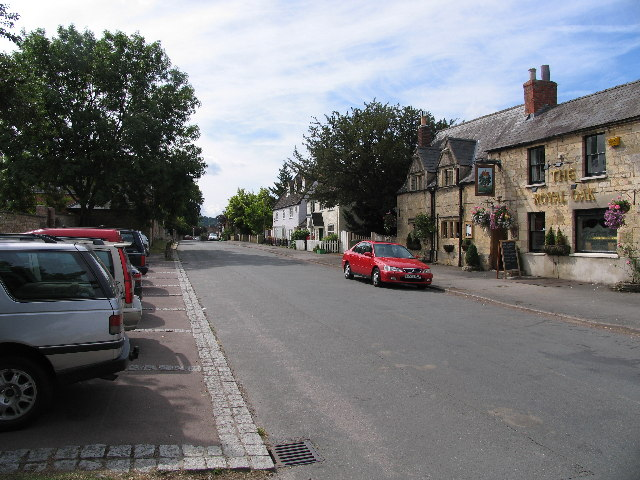
- The Burgage (road), Prestbury

- Location within Gloucestershire
- Area: 5.7 km^{2} (2.2 sq mi) Civil parish
- Population: 8,022
  - Density: 1,407/km^{2} (3,640/sq mi)
- Conservation area: Designated 15 August 1971
- Language: English
- OS grid reference: SO971239
- Civil parish: Prestbury
- District: Cheltenham
- Shire county: Gloucestershire
- Region: South West
- Country: England
- Sovereign state: United Kingdom
- Post town: CHELTENHAM
- Postcode district: GL52
- Dialling code: 01242
- Police: Gloucestershire
- Fire: Gloucestershire
- Ambulance: South Western
- UK Parliament: Tewkesbury
- Website: Prestbury Parish Council

Prestbury is a village and civil parish in the borough of Cheltenham in Gloucestershire, England. Part of the Tewkesbury parliamentary constituency, it lies approximately 1.5 miles north-east of Cheltenham town centre, at the foot of Cleeve Hill and the Cotswold escarpment.

The modern civil parish is much larger than the historic village core, including Noverton, parts of neighbouring residential areas and Cheltenham Racecourse. The parish of Prestbury had a population of 8,022 according to the 2021 census.

First mentioned in 899-904, the village transitioned into a medieval market borough between the 13th and 18th centuries under the demesne of the Bishops of Hereford. After the decline of market borough status, it briefly adopted a spa tradition to mirror Cheltenham during the Victorian years, and today it is a popular village with a distinctive protected character and 60 listed buildings, most notably the Grade II* listed St Mary's Church.

== History ==
The name of the village means "Priests' fortified place", from Anglo-Saxon preost and burh, possibly from a fortified manor house belonging to the Bishop of Hereford in the 13th century. The settlement is mentioned as Preosdabyrig in 899-904. Prestbury is listed in the Domesday Book of 1086 as "Presteberie", part of the property of the church of Hereford, with 18 villagers, five smallholders, a priest, a riding man and 11 slaves. By the 13th century it had become Presbery.

A cottage on The Burgage showing elements of the medieval borough

In 1249 the bishop of Hereford was granted permission to hold a weekly market along with a three-day annual fair in August. The weekly market was believed to have been held in The Burgage, with evidence it was thriving in 1280 and 1394.

The village became eclipsed as a trading centre by Cheltenham following the end of the medieval period. The market started to decline in the 15th century, with an attempt to revive it during the early 16th century, and had lapsed completely by the start of the 18th century.

In the middle of the 18th century a mineral spring was discovered in the parish, and by 1751 a local landowner, Lord Craven, had a business providing bathing and lodging. However it did not last past the end of the century.

The Prestbury War Memorial is a Cotswold stone Gothic Revival column with six engraved panels commemorating the villagers who died in the First World War (1914–1918). The memorial was severely damaged in October 2011 in an act of vandalism when the column was toppled to the ground and smashed. A replacement column, using stone from the original quarry, was rededicated on 14 April 2012.

There are claims that Prestbury is the most haunted village in England, and one of the most haunted in Britain.

== Built environment and conservation area ==
Prestbury was designated as a conservation area by Gloucestershire County Council on 15 August 1971, and then reviewed in 2001, currently covering 26 hectares. This area covers the historic boundaries of Prestbury rather than the modern civil parish. The special interest of the area is derived from:

- retaining its distinctive village character
- the architectural variety of buildings
- mature tree growth, extensive open spaces and historic buildings
- use of Cotswold stone walls throughout the area

Among 60 Grade II / Grade II* listed buildings, notable sites of historic interest are St Mary's Church, a Grade II* listed building whose western tower dates from the thirteenth century, the Medieval bishop's manor site and the Manor House on Bowbridge Lane.

== Geography and settlement ==
Prestbury lies approximately 1.5 miles north-east of Cheltenham town centre. It sits at the foot of Cleeve Hill and the Cotswold escarpment. Despite urban sprawl replacing the formerly agricultural land separating Cheltenham town with Prestbury (with the residential housing areas of Whaddon and Lynnworth), the village centre retains it's distinctive character with medieval and Tudor buildings. The village is bisected by Prestbury Road from Cheltenham, into Deep Street/High Street, then into Southam Road to the north.

The modern civil parish is substantially larger than the historic core, containing Prestbury, Noverton and parts of Wyman's Brook, Marle Hill, Cleevemount and Lynworth. Prestbury Park is the historic name for Cheltenham Racecourse, which is also within the parish boundary.

== Demographics ==
There were 8,022 people living in Prestbury civil parish as of the 2021 census.

Prestbury has a significant retired population as of the total population, 16.2% were aged 0-15 (vs 18.6% England average), 57.1% 16-64 (vs England average 63.0%) and 26.7% aged 65+ (vs England average 18.4%).

Prestbury also skews more affluent than England. Just 4.6% of residents are classed as "Hard-pressed living" (compared to 17.2% across England), and 60.1% are classed as "Suburbanites" (compared to 20.8% across England).

== Amenities ==
The village shops include two stores and a petrol station with a store. There is a public library, three hairdressers, a pharmacy, and a butcher. A brasserie and pub, the King's Arms, was the village's main public house, and it was here that the 19th-century jockey Fred Archer grew up, his father being the landlord of the pub. There are three further village pubs: the Plough, the Beehive and the Royal Oak.

== Prestbury Racecourse ==
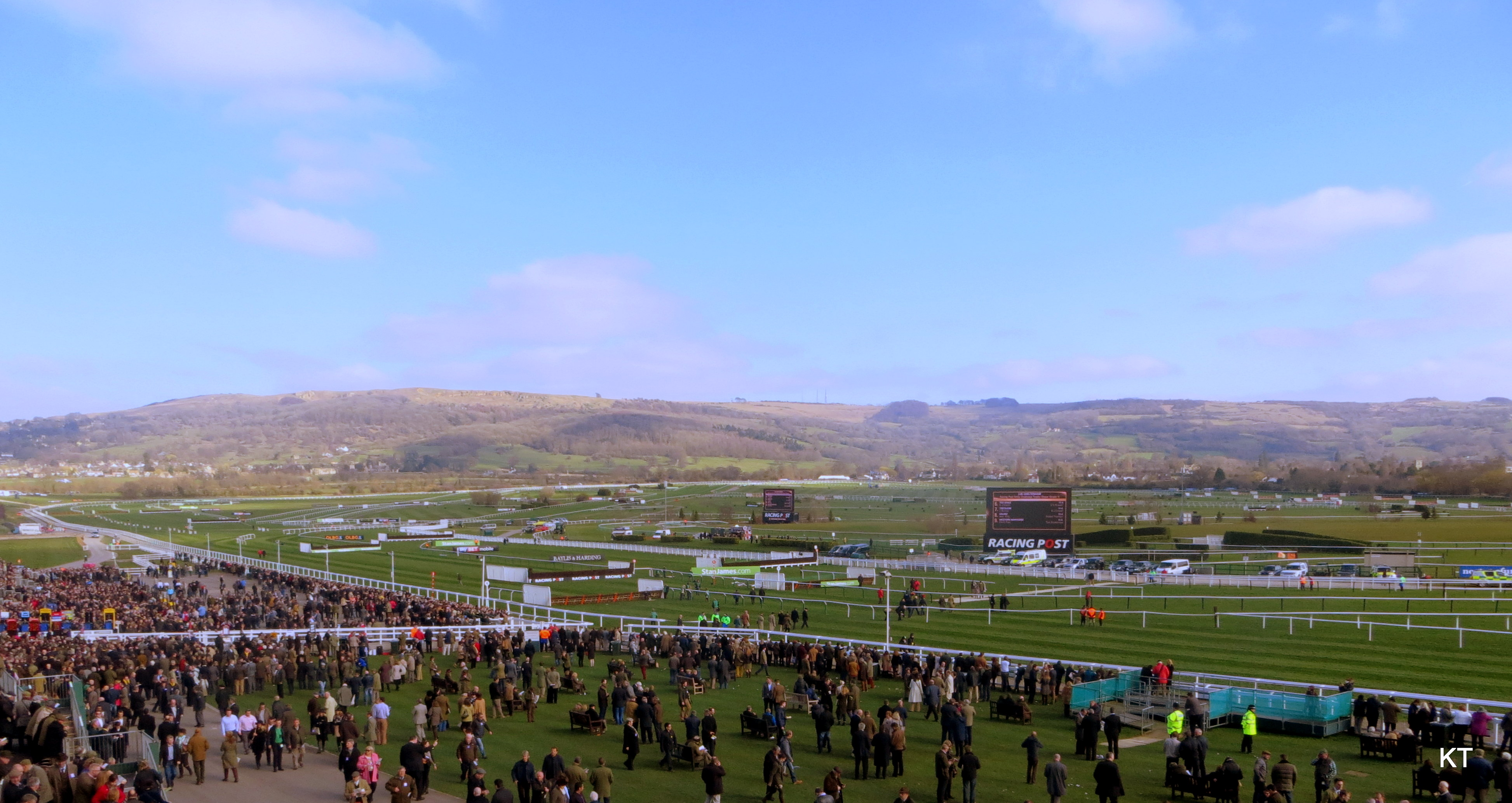
Cheltenham Racecourse at Prestbury Park

The village is home to Prestbury Park, the Cheltenham Racecourse, which holds the Gold Cup race each March. Racehorse trainers Frenchy Nicholson and his son David Nicholson had stables in Prestbury. Notable Nicholson apprentices include Pat Eddery, Walter Swinburn, and Mouse Morris the 2006 Cheltenham Gold Cup winning trainer with the horse War of Attrition.

== Governance ==
Prestbury civil parish has been in the Borough of Cheltenham since 1991; it was in Cheltenham Rural District from 1894 to 1974, and the Borough of Tewkesbury from 1974 to 1991.

The parish is presently split between four wards of the Borough of Cheltenham: Swindon Village, Prestbury, Pittville (a very small part) and Oakley; three electoral divisions of the county of Gloucestershire: St Paul's and Swindon, Pittville and Prestbury, and All Saints and Oakley; and two parliamentary constituencies: Tewkesbury and Cheltenham.

== Gallery ==
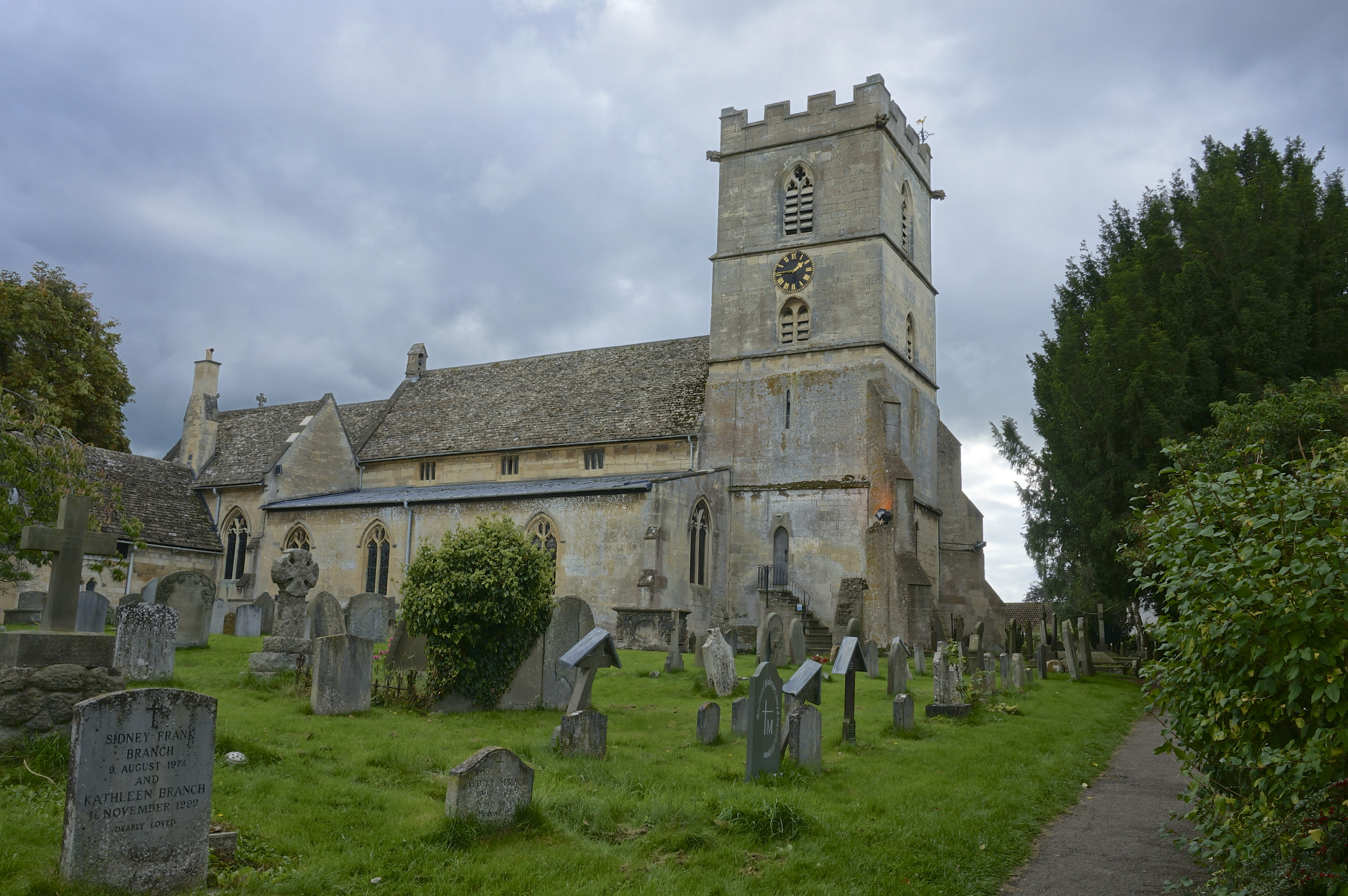
St Mary's Church, Prestbury; view from Mill Street

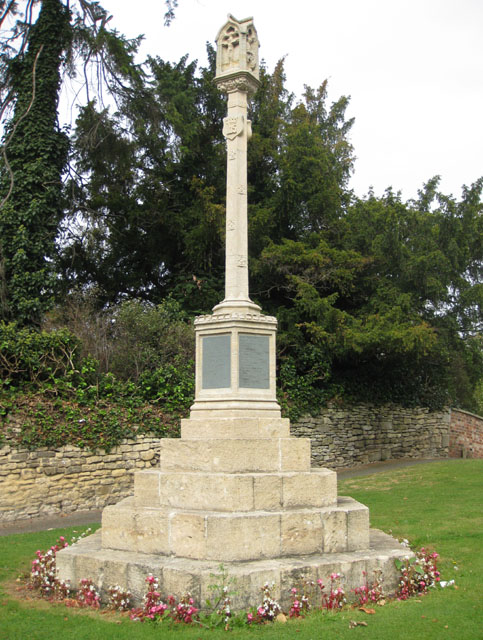
Prestbury War Memorial

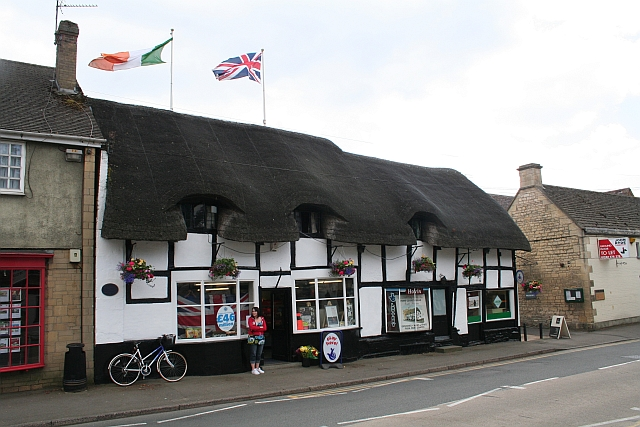
Thatched shop in Prestbury
