= Trinity Cheltenham =

Church in Cheltenham, Gloucestershire, England

Coordinates: 51°54′12″N 2°4′18″W

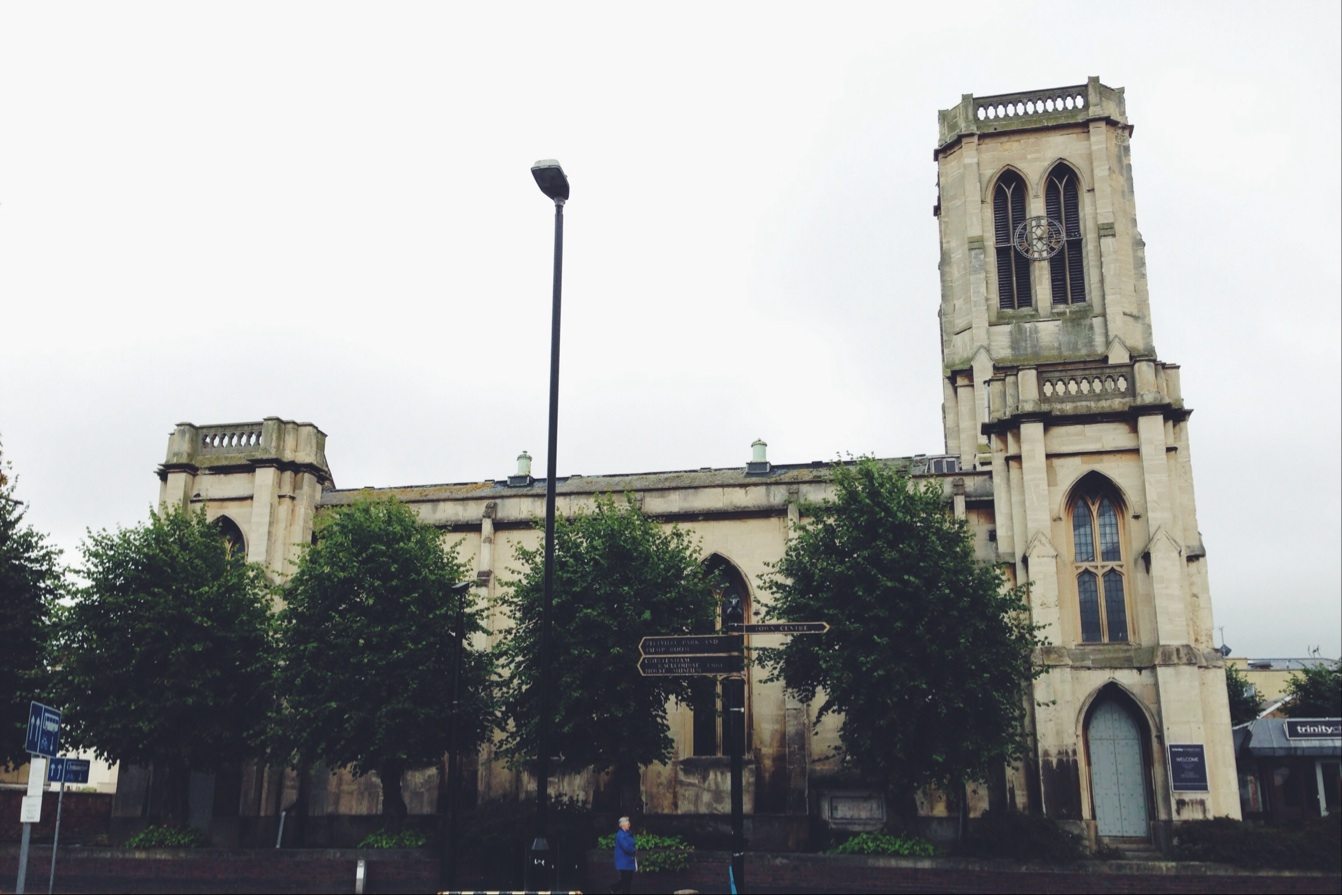
The Portland Street view of Trinity Cheltenham Church

Trinity Cheltenham is an Evangelical, charismatic Anglican church in Cheltenham, Gloucestershire, England.

== Overview ==
The church was originally known as "Trinity" when it was first opened, then "Holy Trinity" before reverting to its original name. It is part of the Church of England and is a major contributor to the New Wine network. The Church has around 1000 members, making it one of the largest churches in the UK. A recent article cited it as the 11th largest church in Britain.

As well as Sunday services, the church offers an array of mid-week activities, including the Alpha Course, 'King's Table', Life groups and activities for children, young people and students. There are now more than 1,000 people who worship on a regular basis.

== Location ==
The main church building is located on Portland Street, Cheltenham. The church also owns Trinity House and Trinity Fusion, behind the church building on Trinity Lane, and its offices are located in Winchcombe House.

== Senior leadership and staff ==
- Reverend Tim Grew – Pastor & Team Vicar
- Hils Grew - Pastor
- Liz Lang - Churchwarden
- Barry Lambert - Churchwarden

Trinity also employs a number of staff on a full-time or part-time basis, and all of its events and activities are facilitated by a large number of volunteers.

== History ==
Trinity Church came into being in 1824 as an overflow from the Parish Church in the town center. The first minister was the Rev Francis Close, Rector of Cheltenham and later Dean of Carlisle Cathedral. The Dean Close School was named after him. The Church was opened with an address from the Rev Charles Simeon.

In 1976, Trinity Church was on the point of closure. However, under the ministry of a retired missionary (Canon Lawrence Totty), change had slowly begun to happen. The threat of closure was removed and under two subsequent vicars, Rev John Risdon and Rev Paul Harris, the church continued to grow and start to reach out into the community.

In 1994 Mark Bailey was appointed as a pastor and the church building underwent major renovations. In 2000, Trinity House, the three-storey building immediately behind the church, was purchased.

Continued growth presented logistical problems, and by the end of 2004 the church started holding multiple services each Sunday. In January 2005 the 'Trinity Growth Project' was launched and most of the staff and administrative team moved out of Trinity House to offices in Winchcombe House. In 2008 the church purchased the Fusion Building next to Trinity House on Winchcombe Street, and in 2009 began a refurbishment of the main church building to increase the capacity to nearly 650.

Mark Bailey resigned as team rector and accepted a two-year suspension from ministry by the Bishop of Gloucester in 2016.

Andrew Blyth took up post as Lead Pastor and Team Rector in 2017.

In 2022, the church received a £35,000 grant (over 3 years) from the Diocese of Gloucester’s LIFE Development Fund to run its new Spear programme, aimed at helping young people realise their potential and find employment.
