= Cotswold Grange, Cheltenham =

Historical building in Cheltenham, Gloucestershire, England

Coordinates: 51°54′14″N 2°03′51″W

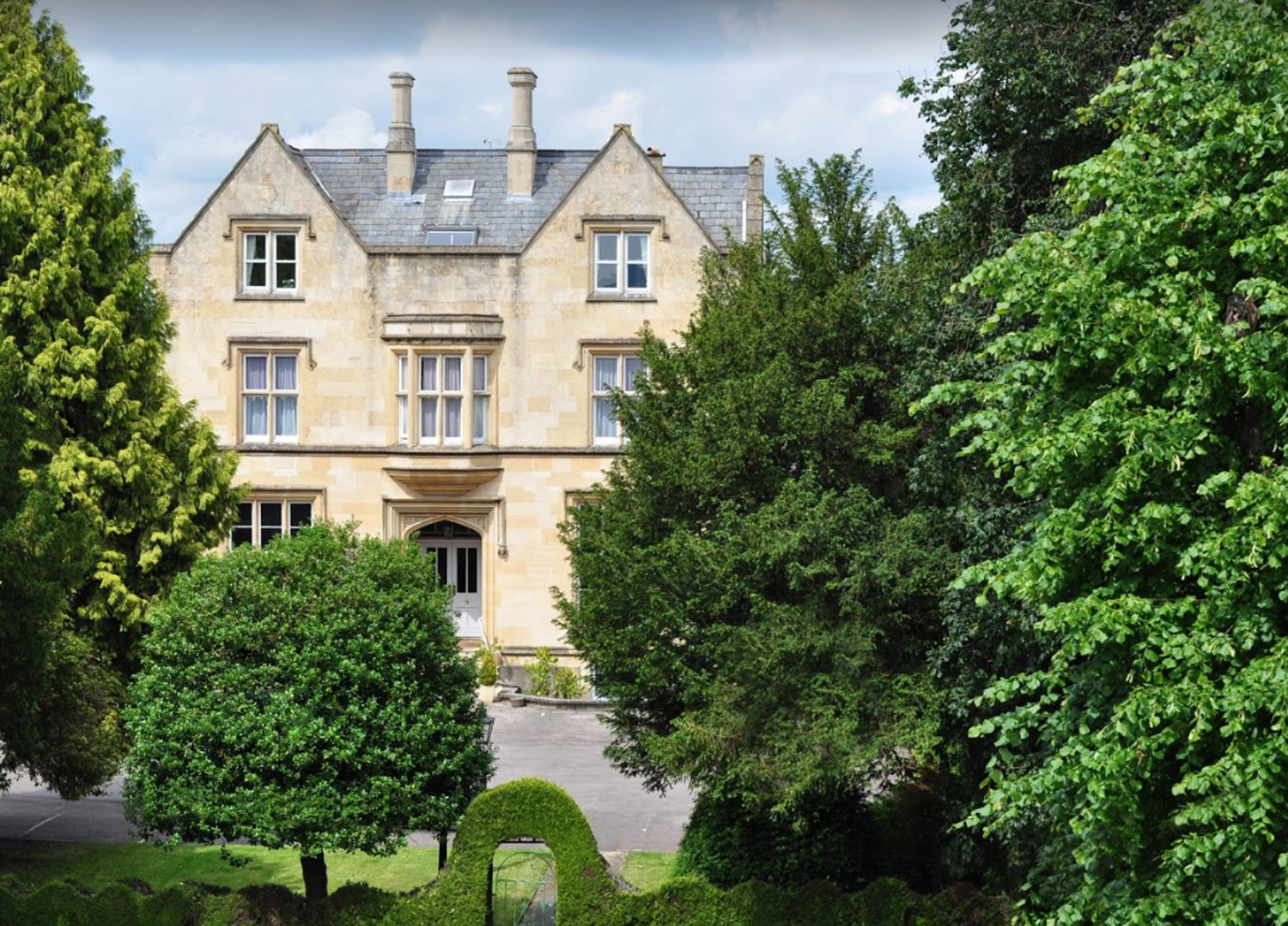
Cotswold Grange, Cheltenham

Cotswold Grange Hotel in Cheltenham is a building of historical significance. It was built in about 1840 as a private residence and was home to many notable people over the next century. It is now a hotel which provides accommodation and event services.

== Early history ==
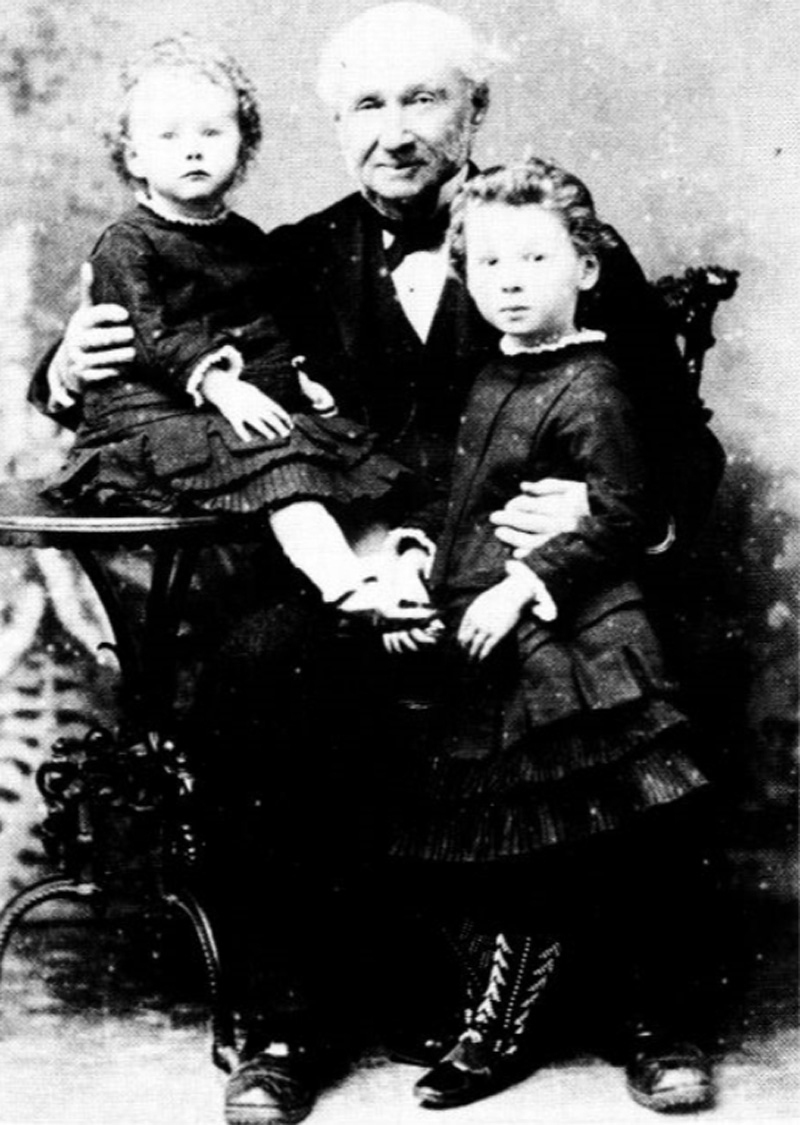
John Waddingham with his two grandchildren in about 1860.

Cotswold Grange was erected in about 1840 and one of its earliest residents was John Waddingham (1799–1890), a wealthy merchant and landed proprietor. He is shown to be living there from about 1848 until 1862. He is recorded in the 1851 Census as the occupier of the house with his wife Margaret, three children and six servants. He was still living there ten years later as revealed in the 1861 Census. Soon after this he moved to Guiting Grange near Winchcombe.

John Waddingham was born in 1799 in South Ferriby, Lincolnshire. By 1822 he was working in a family company in Leeds but he soon developed his own business in woollen and other types of cloth. In 1837 he married Margaret Wilkinson daughter of James Wilkinson of Bradford Yorkshire. The couple had three children, two sons and a daughter.

By 1846 at the age of 47 John had made enough money to retire so he came to Cheltenham and soon after moved into Cotswold Grange. He took an interest in Cheltenham community affairs and in 1861 became High Sheriff of Gloucestershire. He acquired a large amount of property and in about 1862 moved to Guiting Grange where he lived until his death in 1890 at the age of 91. After his departure Cotswold Grange became the home of Francis Adams.

== The Adams family ==
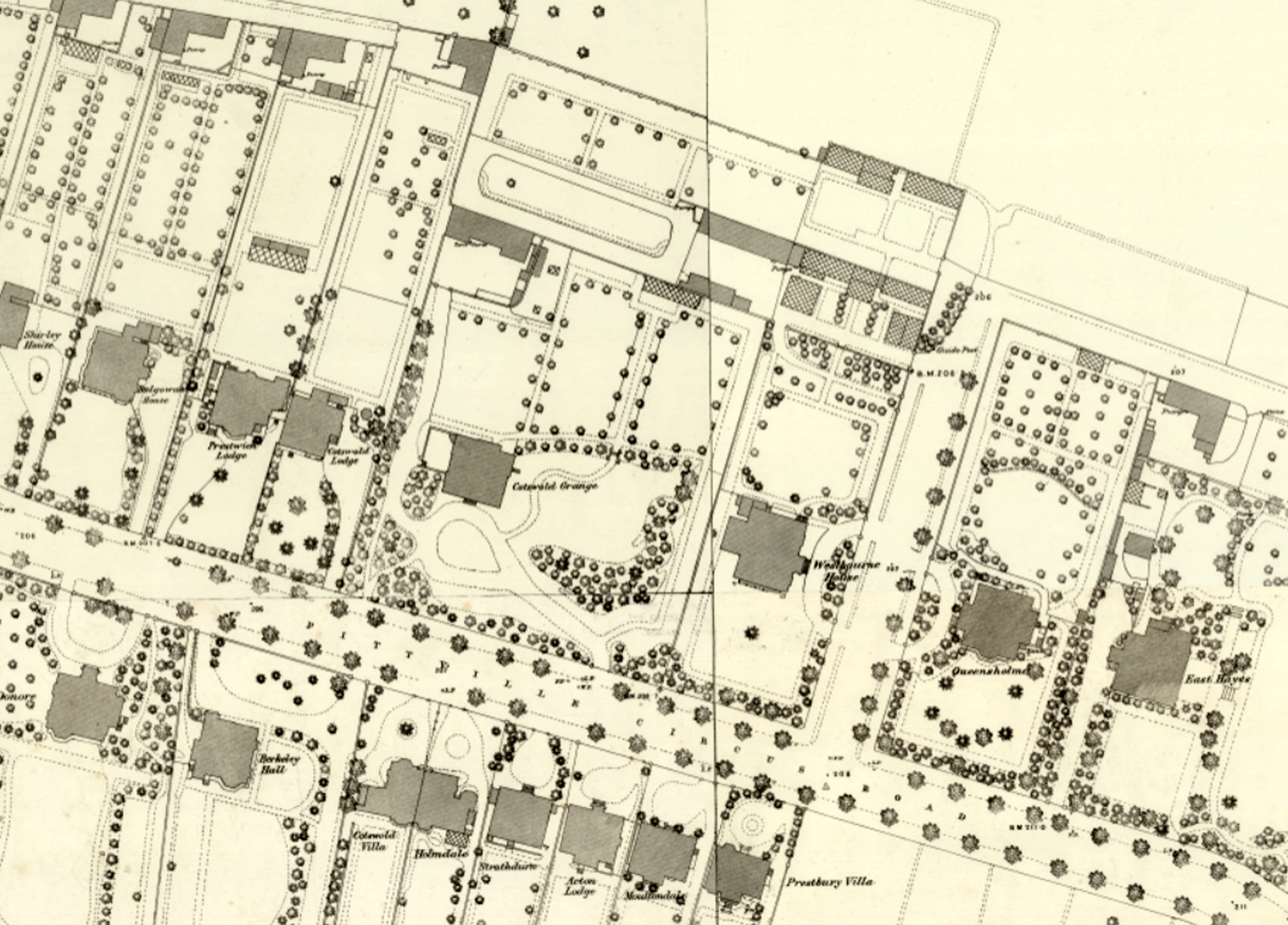
Map of Cotswold Grange (centre) in 1885

Francis Adams (1812–1885) was born in 1812 in Clifton, Bristol. He was the only son of Francis Adams (1791–1844) who lived in Southmead House and had a private income. He also owned property in Norton Malreward. His mother was Mary Shute Manley the daughter of John Manley who owned Hatbrook House in Belgravia. In 1835 he married Maria daughter of Rev. Doveton of Everdon Hall. The couple had eight children – four sons and four daughters.

When his father died in 1844 he inherited his property. The couple lived in Clifton for some time then moved to Cheltenham in about 1862. Francis died in 1885 but Maria continued to live at Cotswold Grange until her death in 1910 at the age of 96. Soon after her death the house was advertised for sale. The advertisement read:

The most attractive and picturesque freehold residence charmingly positioned with extensive views of the Cotswold Hills and known as Cotswold Grange, Pittville Circus Road Cheltenham. The accommodation includes eleven bed and dressing rooms and four entertaining rooms, servants' hall and offices, two staircases etc. Excellent stabling for five horses with living rooms. Choicely arranged pleasure grounds and good kitchen garden in all about two acres.

The property was bought by the Bellhouse family.

== The Bellhouse family ==
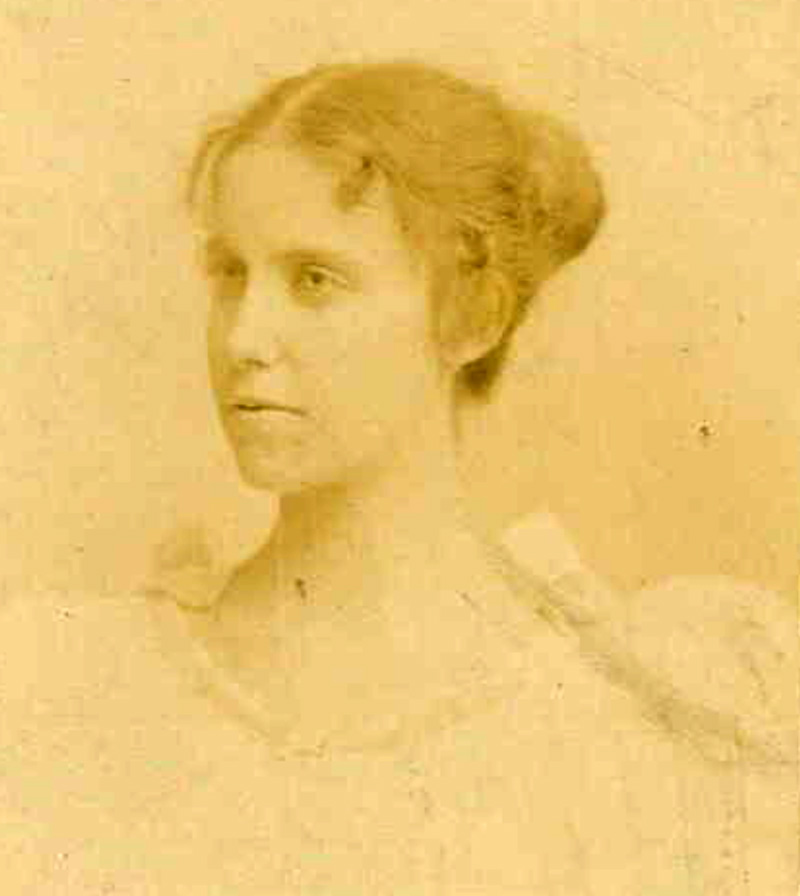
Jessie Bellhouse, resident of Cotswold Grange from 1912 until 1958

Walter Bellhouse (1838–1915) bought the house in about 1912. He was a partner in the firm J & W Bellhouse and had become fairly wealthy. He was born in 1838 in Manchester and in 1864 married Caroline Louisa Lyon the daughter of Arthur Wentworth Lyon who owned a large mansion called Abbots Clownholme in Doveridge. The couple had six children, three of whom, John, Ernest and Jessie, had remained single and were living with their parents when they all moved to Cotswold Grange. Walter died three years later in 1915 and his wife Caroline died in 1932. Ernest Bellhouse died in 1920.

John Bellhouse (1869–1946) was born in 1869 in Cheshire. After school he entered the Royal Military Academy, Woolwich. He served with the Royal Artillery and was made a lieutenant in 1891. However, after he served in India he became ill and was invalided out on half pay in 1903. He died in 1946 and left his money to his sister Jessie, the last Bellhouse resident of the house.

Jessie Bellhouse (1867–1958) was born in Cheshire in 1867. She was the person who was responsible for the orderly running of the house and hiring of the servants. She was a member of Cheltenham Ladies Golf Club and played frequently. She was a keen gardener and sometimes entered gardening competitions. She was often involved in fund raising activities for charities and was mentioned in newspapers for giving donations.

In 1939 Jessie's niece Caroline Prine and her daughter Virginia were visiting her in Cotswold Grange for a month and were returning to America on board the famous ship SS Athenia. This was a passenger ship sunk by a German submarine torpedo shortly before the outbreak of World War II. A newspaper report tells of Jessie's anxious 24 hour ordeal while she waited for news of her niece. Fortunately she received a phone call early in the morning informing her that they were safe and had been brought in with other survivors to Glasgow.

Jessie died in 1958 and sometime later the house became a hotel. It still serves this function today.
