= Pittville School =

Location
- Albert Road; Pittville; Cheltenham, Gloucestershire, GL52 3JD; England; 51.9114°N 2.0635°W

Information
- Type: Foundation school
- Motto: Learning to achieve
- Established: 1986
- Local authority: Gloucestershire
- Department for Education URN: 115772 Tables
- Ofsted: Reports
- Headteacher: Paul Dipple
- Gender: Coeducational
- Age: 11 to 16
- Houses: Abbott, Livingstone, Aston, Stokes
- Website: http://pittville.gloucs.sch.uk/

Pittville School is a coeducational foundation secondary school in the Pittville area of Cheltenham in the English county of Gloucestershire.

The school occupies the buildings and grounds formerly occupied by Pate's Grammar School for Girls; the school was founded in 1986, when Pate's moved within Cheltenham as a result of a merger.

As a foundation school, Pittville is administered by Gloucestershire County Council. The school also has a specialism in the performing arts.
