= Joseph Pitt =

British lawyer and property developer (1759–1842)

Joseph Pitt (1759–1842) was a British lawyer of humble origins who prospered as a property speculator, notably in Cheltenham, Gloucestershire, but also in Wiltshire, and who served as a Tory MP for Cricklade, Wiltshire 1812–1831. His name is commemorated in Pittville, Cheltenham, his largest speculative development.
