= Henry Norwood =

His Excellency Sir Henry Norwood
- Born: c. 1614
- Died: September 14, 1689 (aged 74–75); Leckhampton Court, Gloucestershire
- Resting place: St Peter's Church, Leckhampton
- Other names: Colonel Norwood
- Notable work: A Voyage to Virginia (1649)
- Parents: Henry Norwood; Elizabeth Rodney

Governor of Tangier
- In office 1666–1669
- Monarch: Charles II
- Preceded by: John Belasyse, 1st Baron Belasyse
- Succeeded by: John Middleton, 1st Earl of Middleton

Treasurer of Virginia
- In office 22 September 1650 – 1669
- Monarch: Charles II

Mayor of Gloucester
- In office 1672–1673
- Monarch: Charles II
- Preceded by: Thomas Yate
- Succeeded by: William Selwyn

Member of Parliament for Gloucester
- In office 1675–1679
- Monarch: Charles II
- Succeeded by: Sir John Guise, 2nd Baronet

Military service
- Allegiance: Cavaliers
- Battles/wars: First English Civil War: Storming of Bristol (1643); Siege of Worcester (1646)

Henry Norwood (c. 1614 – 1689), of Bishampton, Worcestershire (or, later, of Leckhampton, Gloucestershire) supported the Royalist cause in the English Civil War as a distinguished cavalry officer fighting as a volunteer at Bristol and Worcester. After the defeat, trial and execution of Charles I, he set out on what proved to be a difficult journey to Virginia, where a cousin (Sir William Berkeley) was governor. He returned to England, became active as an agent attempting to aid Royalist uprisings, and spent a significant time imprisoned in the Tower of London for his pro-Royalist activities. Upon his release he was involved in Booth's Uprising and, subsequently, acted as a messenger between Charles II of England and Edward Montagu, Earl of Sandwich. He was appointed deputy governor in Dunkirk a little after the Restoration and, when Dunkirk was sold to Louis XIV of France, he was sent to Tangier, where he rose to become governor. He was a Member (MP) of the Parliament of England for Gloucester 20 April 1675. He died in Leckhampton in 1689, and was buried in St Peter's Church, Leckhampton.

== Family and early life ==
Early life and Civil War

He was the second son of Henry Norwood, of West Camel, Somerset, and his wife, Elizabeth Rodney (widow of James Kirton), and was born in about 1614: His elder brother Charles was born in 1613, and his father died in 1616. Little is known of his life until, in 1637, he was admitted to the Inner Temple, listed as of Bishampton, Worcestershire. It is likely that the outbreak of the English Civil War intervened to halt a potential legal career: In 1647, Norwood's name was listed as owing debts and duties to the Inn; but on 30 May 1660, the day after the Restoration, he was finally called to the bar. Nevertheless, by then, Norwood was first and foremost a soldier, and there is no record that he was ever active as a lawyer.

Norwood joined the Royalist forces in the early days of the Civil War and was commissioned in December 1642 to raise a troop in Gloucestershire and Worcestershire. In 1643, he was a Captain in Colonel Washington's force under Prince Rupert at the Storming of Bristol and appears to have remained with Washington until the surrender of Worcester in July, 1646. The garrison was given passes, on parole never to bear Arms any more against the Parliament of England, to return to their homes (or other places) or to go overseas within two months. Norwood evidently chose to go overseas: He met, in Holland, other Royalists (in particular, Majors Francis Moryson or Morrison and Richard Fox) and (according to Norwood's account) came to an agreement to pursue their fortunes in Virginia. Norwood was second cousin to the Governor of Virginia, Sir William Berkeley, their grandmothers being Margery and Elizabeth Lygon, and Moryson held a commission from Charles II as Captain of Fort Comfort (where, in fact, his brother Lieutenant Robert Moryson was already in charge). Other Norwoods had already emigrated to Virginia. Strangely, perhaps, in the light of those connections, Norwood himself says my best cargaroon (usually illicit cargo) was his Majesty’s gracious letter in my favour, which took effect beyond my expectation, because it recommended me (above whatever I had or could deserve) to the governor’s particular care. He does not say how he had earned the specific recommendation.

Virginia

Some time after the January 1649 beheading of King Charles, Norwood, Moryson and Fox met in London and secured passage on a ship, The Virginia Merchant, Captain John Lockyer, bound for James River, Virginia. It is not clear why the three were in London at that time: One source, not especially reliable, suggests that they had intended a mission to rescue Charles I from Carisbrooke Castle but arrived too late. Norwood appeared before the Committee for Compounding with Delinquents in June 1949, and is recorded as never sequestered nor engaged in the last war. Whatever the reason for being back in England, the three (in company with about 130 other emigrants) set out from the Downs on 23 September 1649. The tale of the voyage, with dolphins, shipwreck, cannibalism, and (friendly) Indians, was told by Henry Norwood in A Voyage to Virginia published many years later, in 1732. The ship, under-provisioned, called at Fyall, left there on 22 October, and crossed on the trade winds to Bermuda (where they could not land) and Cape Hatteras where the ship grounded, but got back out to sea. Storms struck for some days and the ship was dismasted, except the mizzen; a mighty sea struck the ship and removed the fo'c's'le. The disabled ship survived and made land on 4 January 1650. Moryson went ashore with the ship's mate, found fresh water, and was thereafter followed by Norwood and others. The location has been generally identified as what is now Ocean City, Maryland, just offshore from the Chesapeake Peninsula.

The ship sailed off, unexpectedly, on the next day, leaving those onshore marooned. After about ten days (during which the supposed cannibalism - of the corpses of those who died - occurred) the party were found by friendly Native Americans, and taken by canoe to their own village of (or in) Kickotank. There, when the word Accawmacke (probably referring to the nation after which the town is named) was recognised by Norwood (as the English settlement in Virginia) the king or chief sent word to that settlement. Meanwhile, The Virginia Merchant had made it on to James River. Guided by a planter or trader, Jenkin Price (later, surveyor in Somerset County, Maryland) who had been sent to find them, Norwood trekked over to Price's base at Littleton's Plantation in (or on the edge of) Accomac (at that time Northampton County). From there, he travelled on to Yeardley's plantation and across Chesapeake Bay to York River at Ludlow's Plantation (which seems to have been where Yorktown power station is now). There (or rather, at neighbouring Wormeley's, across the creek) he met with old acquaintances before moving on, borrowing a horse, to Jamestown, finally reaching his destination, Sir William Berkeley's house at Green Spring Plantation, about the middle of February.

There is independent verification of the disastrous voyage, although different in several details from Norwood's account, in a petition to the High Court of Admiralty in 1650, by dependents of crew members, against the captain and owners of The Virginia Merchant.

By Norwood's own account, Berkeley provided him with money to purchase the office of Treasurer of Virginia and, in May 1650, he went to Holland to do that. Although the King Charles II was in Scotland following the Treaty of Breda, he apparently granted a patent appointing Norwood as Escheator, Treasurer and Receiver of Quit Rents in Virginia. That closes Norwood's account of his purpose to seek (his) fortune in Virginia and it is not clear whether he ever returned there. The tension between Virginia and the Parliament in England culminating in the surrender of the colony on 12 March 1652 (but not ending then) probably precluded that, at least until the re-election of Sir William Berkeley in 1660. However, after the Restoration (if not before) Norwood continued to receive the benefit of the quit rents for some years, an income difficult to estimate because of the collection difficulties, but several hundred pounds each year until 1669, and a smaller amount thereafter. Moryson acted as his agent (and, in effect, as Treasurer of Virginia).

English Interregnum

After his departure for Holland in May 1650, little is known of Norwood's movements for a short spell. His appointment as Treasurer in Virginia is recorded as dated 22 September 1650. Charles II left Holland on 2 June 1650 (it being, thus, unlikely but not impossible that Norwood could have seen him before then) and landed in Scotland on 24 June. It is very unlikely that Norwood went to Scotland, as some secondary sources suggest; the Scots severely restricted the English (and others) who were allowed access to the king. Nevertheless, it is said that the appointment was sealed at St Johnstoun, Perth. on 22 September 1650. The King was there: he had been taken to Perth after the Scots had been heavily defeated at Dunbar on 2 September 1650. Hence, the issue of a patent at the given place and time is possible; the presence of Norwood, the patentee, is highly unlikely. It is more likely that he was in England, as others suggest.

There is no (known) record of Norwood's activities in the latter part of 1650 or in 1651. The assertion that he returned to Virginia seems to be based on the account given later by Edmund Custis on examination by John Thurloe in 1655 but that was to some extent a cover story for their firearms activity, and is nowhere corroborated. On 9 April 1652 Norwood was in England: He was under arrest in Kent, under suspicion of complicity in the assassination of Dr Isaac Dorislaus. Dorislaus, regarded as a regicide for his role in the trial of Charles I, had been killed at the Hague on 12 May 1649. Again, if Norwood's Virginia account is truthful, he could not have been involved in that, and no direct link has been shown. He was released some time later without trial.

In late December 1654, Norwood was involved in the purchase and transport of firearms to Sir Henry Lyttelton (and, perhaps, others), almost certainly as part of the preparation for risings in conjunction with the Penruddock uprising. He was imprisoned in the Tower, questioned several times by Thurloe, and (reportedly) by Cromwell himself. No charge was brought (as no charge was brought against Lyttelton) but he was imprisoned in the Tower and in September 1656 he petitioned Thurloe for his release. He was in a state of some poverty and, in March 1657, his debt to the warders was paid by the state. Thereafter, he was granted an allowance of 10 shillings per day for his subsistence. While in the Tower, Norwood was able to correspond with William Rumbold, who was one of Ormonde's and Chancellor Hyde's agents in London. At some point, Cromwell ordered him taken to Jersey, and he was imprisoned there until his release was authorised by Richard Cromwell in February 1659 (when Parliament ordered Robert Overton to be brought back from Jersey).

Norwood's release from Jersey was conditional; he was not to come into England without leave; he was not to act abroad against the Commonwealth; and he was required to put up a surety for £500. He was soon in England (without leave) and was in frequent contact with Hyde and the Court in exile. He went to Shropshire (attempting to raise troops) and Cheshire in July 1659 and was captured, with Sir George Booth at Winnington Bridge. However, his identity was not revealed, and he was soon released. In March 1660, Norwood went from England to Brussels, to the king, and returned with letters. At about that time (on 24 March 1660) he was given a warrant as an Esquire of the Body (which required him, later, to attend the Coronation of Charles II). On 21 April 1660 Samuel Pepys met him, and was instructed (by his patron, Edward Montagu) to give Norwood a convoy to Brill but not to enter it in the record, Pepys deducing that he was going to the King, then at Breda. Upon the Restoration, in addition to being an Esquire of the Body, he was made Captain (for life) of Sandown Castle, a largely honorary title (but carrying a stipend) the Castle being partly ruinous with a merely nominal garrison. In September 1661, he was commissioned Lieutenant-Colonel in Rutherfurd's Regiment in Dunkirk, then an English possession and in about March 1662 became Deputy Governor there.

Tangier

In 1664 he was posted to Tangier as Colonel of the Queen's Royal Regiment, the known as the Tangier Regiment of Foot, who provided a garrison for the town. Tangier had been part of the dowry of Catherine of Braganza when she married Charles II of England in 1662, but was constantly under threat of attack by native forces.

In June 1666 he took over as Governor of Tangier from John, Baron Belasyse, who as a devout Catholic had felt unable to accept the Act of Uniformity and resigned. He returned to England himself in 1669, replaced as colonel and governor by John Middleton, Earl of Middleton.

Parliament

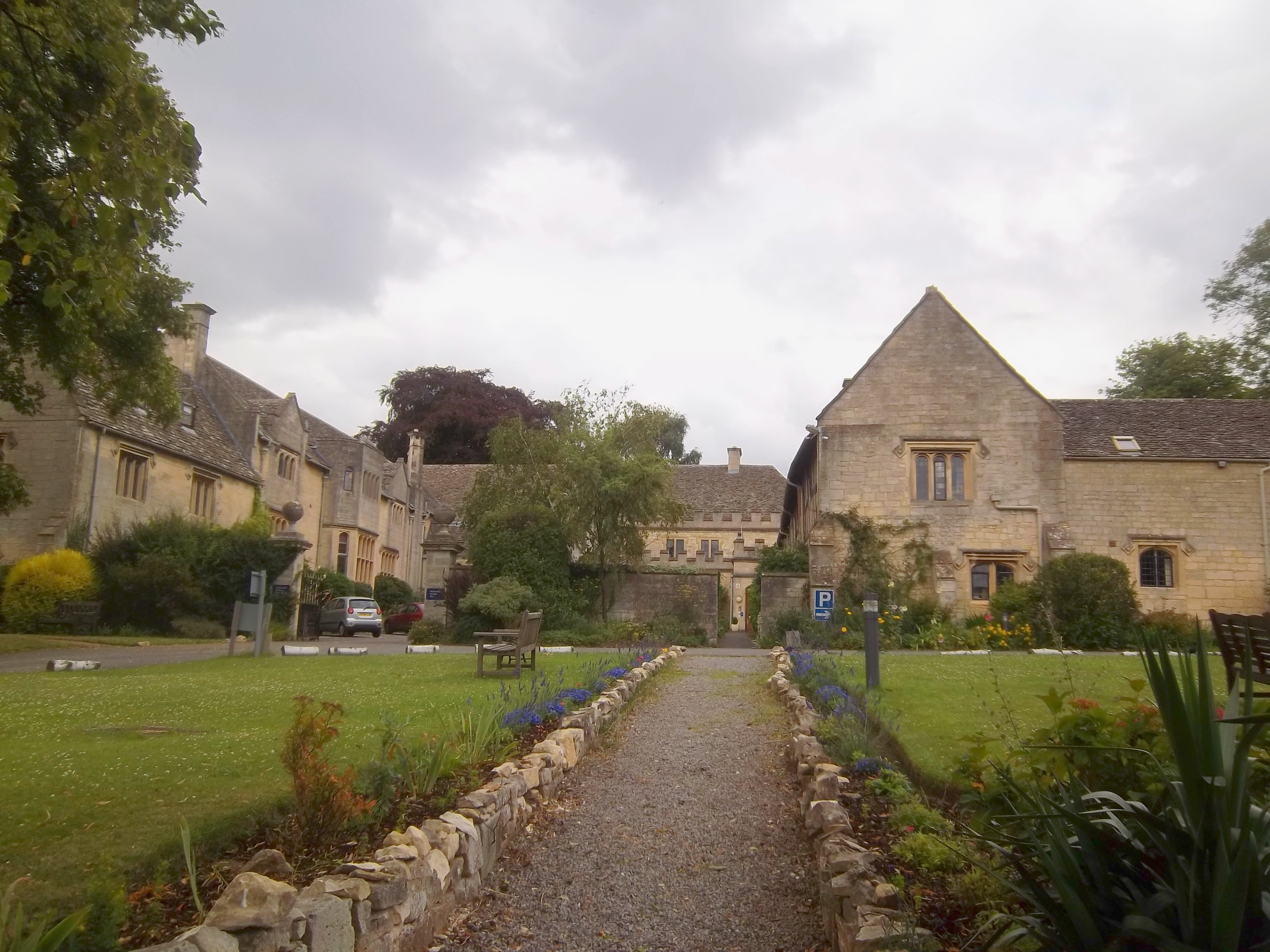
Leckhampton Court, Gloucestershire

Once back in England he disposed of his Virginia Treasury post on terms which ensured a continuing share of the profits and acquired instead the position of Warden of the Fleet Prison, employing a deputy to deal with the actual functions of the office. He bought Leckhampton Court, near Cheltenham, Gloucestershire from his cousin Francis Norwood and moved in, becoming thereafter involved in the somewhat divisive local politics. He was elected an alderman of Gloucester for life in April 1672 and elected Mayor of the city later that year.

In a disputed by-election in 1675 he was returned as the Member of Parliament for Gloucester but was not declared duly elected for another three years. Not a very active member, he did not seek re-election in 1679. He was also appointed a Deputy-Lieutenant for the county in 1683, serving as such, with a short break, until his death.

He died unmarried on 14 September 1689 and was buried in St Peter's churchyard, Leckhampton, having devised his Leckhampton estate to the sons of the cousin from whom he had bought it.

== Notes ==
Parliament of England
Preceded by Sir Edward Massey; Evan Seys	Member of Parliament for Gloucester; 1675–1679; With: Evan Seys	Succeeded by Evan Seys; William Cooke
Military offices
Preceded by The Earl of Teviot	Colonel of the Tangier Regiment; 1664–1668	Succeeded by The Earl of Middleton
