= Gloucester and Cheltenham Tramroad =

Tramway in Gloucestershire, England (1811–1859)

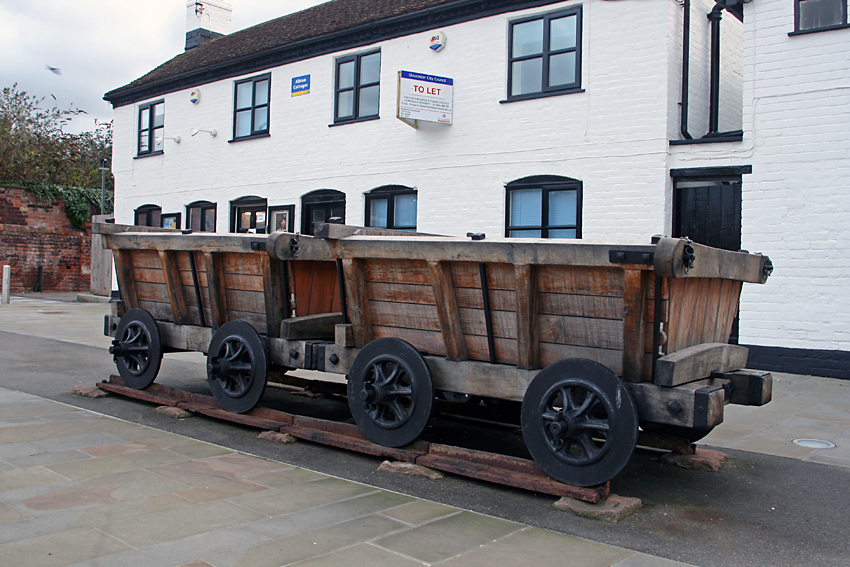
Replica 'trams' on a section of original track at Gloucester Docks

The Gloucester and Cheltenham Tramroad, also known as the Gloucester and Cheltenham Railway, connected Gloucester and Cheltenham with horse-drawn trams. Its primary economic purpose was the transport of coal from the then new Gloucester Docks to the rapidly developing spa town of Cheltenham and the transport of building stone from quarries on nearby Leckhampton Hill.

It opened in 1811 and suffered mixed fortunes financially. A steam engine was tried out, but this was unsuccessful. In 1836 two main line railways jointly acquired the railway, seeking to use its access to Gloucester docks. The majority of the tramroad continued in use, but declined over the years and in 1859 was closed. The steepest part of the Leckhampton incline continued in private use until the 1920s.

== History ==
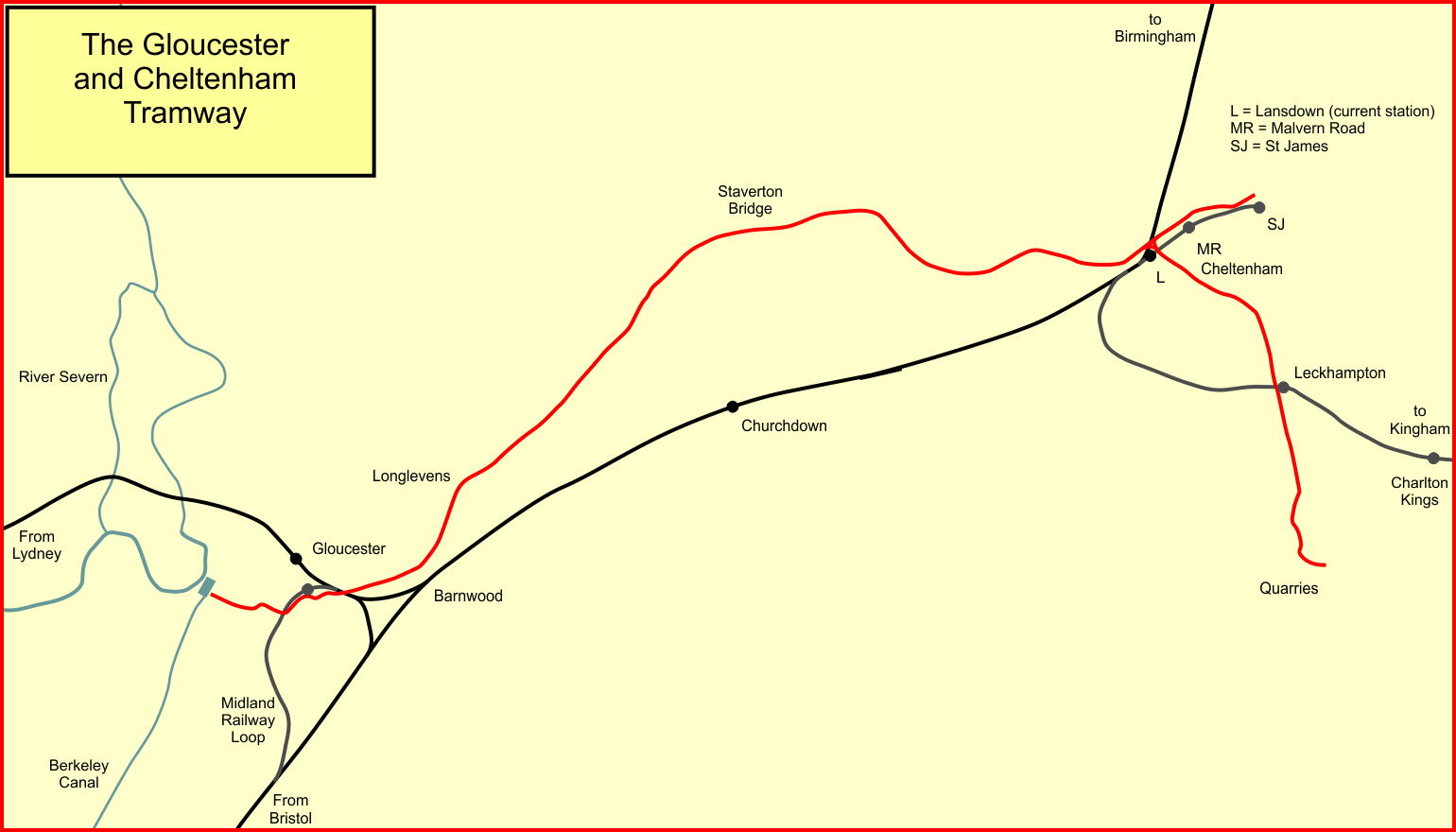
The Gloucester and Cheltenham Tramroad

Towards the end of the eighteenth century, Cheltenham became noted for the supposedly health-giving waters available there, and this attracted wealthy visitors, including King George III, and encouraged residence by the well-to-do. The construction of houses for these families demanded good quality stone, and the more so for paving streets; in addition the demand for coal climbed rapidly. Many of these materials were brought in to Gloucester Docks and had to be conveyed from there to Cheltenham; the Forest of Dean was considered a particularly important source of coal and iron.

Gloucester and Cheltenham Railway Act 1809
- Act of Parliament
- Parliament of the United Kingdom
- Long title: An Act for making and maintaining a Railway of Tram Road from the River Severn at the Quay in the City of Gloucester, to or near to a certain Gate in or near the Town of Cheltenham, in the County of Gloucester, called The Knapp Toll Gate, with a collateral Branch to the Top of Leckhampton Hill, in the Parish of Leckhampton, in the said County.
- Citation: 49 Geo. 3. c. xxiii

Dates
- Royal assent: 28 April 1809
Other legislation
Repealed by	Gloucester and Cheltenham Tramroads Abandonment Act 1859

Status: Repealed

Text of statute as originally enacted

There were competing ideas about how to close the intervening gap from Gloucester to Cheltenham, as the roads were extremely poor. On 28 April 1809, the Gloucester and Cheltenham Railway Company was incorporated by the Gloucester and Cheltenham Railway Act 1809 (49 Geo. 3. c. xxiii), to connect the two places with a branch to a quarry at Leckhampton. Subscriptions to the extent of £26,100 were recorded, of which £10,000 was taken by the Right Honourable James, Lord Sherborne.

Instead of the ceremony of cutting the first sod, much practised later, the construction was initiated by the laying of the first stone block, on 21 November 1809.

The line was a 3 ft 6 in (1,067 mm) gauge plateway, with cast iron plates on stone blocks. Wagons with plain wheels could run on the plates and were guided by an upstand on the plates. The route was single track, but passing places were provided at four to the mile, or more frequently. It appears that more passing places were added later, no doubt in response to higher traffic densities. A marker inscribed "D" was located halfway between every pair of passing places. If two loaded "trains" met, the one that had already reached the D marker had priority and the other had to reverse back. If one was an empty movement, it had to draw back. Two laden trams were considered the limit for a horse to draw. The round trip of seventeen miles on the line was considered to be a day's work. A short length of double track was provided in the dock area at Gloucester.

The priority was considered to be connecting the Leckhampton quarries to Cheltenham and this was given the greatest attention. The branch was built to reach Charles Brandon Trye's quarries on the hill that were already active and to connect with the owner's own existing tramways. The railway terminated at the foot of Leckhampton Hill, and Trye's own tramway continued from there. It was opened for mineral traffic on 2 July 1810. Trye's tramway had gradients of 1 in 35, and near the top three rope-worked incline planes. Several alternative inclined planes were made as the working face receded.

Gloucester and Cheltenham Railway Act 1815
- Act of Parliament
- Parliament of the United Kingdom
- Long title: An Act for enabling the Gloucester and Cheltenham Railway Company to raise a further Sum of Money for the Completion of their Works.
- Citation: 55 Geo. 3. c. xli

Dates
- Royal assent: 12 May 1815
Other legislation
Repealed by	Gloucester and Cheltenham Tramroads Abandonment Act 1859

Status: Repealed

Text of statute as originally enacted

The company now concentrated on finishing the main line by connecting to the River Severn at Gloucester, at Naight Wharf. This was accomplished on 4 June 1811, and the entire route was opened. The company was short of money, however, and the Gloucester and Cheltenham Railway Act 1815 (55 Geo. 3. c. xli) of 12 May was obtained to raise a further £15,000 to clear a debt.

A steam locomotive was tried out on the line in 1831 or 1832. At this period several attempts had been made elsewhere to operate steam engines on plateways. The plates were very weak in bending, and incapable of supporting heavy loads, and the trials elsewhere usually resulted in broken tramplates, quite apart from the doubtful technical effectiveness of the primitive locomotives of the times. There was a considerable road passenger traffic between Cheltenham and Gloucester at the time, and it was considered that passengers might be carried on the line if locomotive operation was introduced. The engine Royal William was acquired for the purpose. (Note: The locomotive is illustrated on the dustjacket of the first edition (1969) of Bick.) Built at the Neath Abbey Ironworks, it was an 0-6-0 tender engine with bell crank connection from vertical cylinders to the connecting rods. The boiler had vertical water-tubes, similar to a Galloway boiler, and a number of unproven technical details.

The engine was tried out on the line, and catastrophic breakage and displacement of the tramplates resulted. Wrought iron tramplates were laid in places about this time, and the company actively considered conversion of the line to an edge railway, but the numerous traders on the line would have objected strongly.

== Route ==
Leaving the dock at Gloucester, the line crossed to the south side of the (later) Midland Railway Eastgate station line and followed it round, crossing again at the site of Horton Road level crossing, then running into Elmbridge Road at Barnwood Road. From Longlevens it ran along the south side of the turnpike road (now B4063) to the point where that road joins the Gloucester Road (now A40). Very close to the present Cheltenham station there was a triangular junction for the Leckhampton arm of the tramway, but the main line continued to a point immediately north of the later St James station.

The Leckhampton branch ran south-east and then south following Leckhampton Road and Leckhampton Hill.

== Main line railways ==
In 1833, after previous abortive proposals, serious ideas were put forward about a railway linking Birmingham and the waterway at Gloucester, which with transshipment, would enable the carriage of goods between Birmingham and Bristol. The route was revised in 1835, and this proposal became the Birmingham and Gloucester Railway.

In the same year, the Cheltenham and Great Western Union Railway was put forward, intended to link the broad gauge Great Western Railway at Swindon with Gloucester and Cheltenham.

Both these schemes were attracted to acquisition of the Gloucester and Cheltenham Tramroad, chiefly to get access to the docks at Gloucester. The tramway alignment between the main towns was obviously unsuitable for main line railway purposes, and a new route was created for the new main line. The interest resulted in the C&GWUR being offered the tramroad for £35,000 on 28 January 1836, but they and the B&GR agreed to work together and acquire the tramroad jointly. They were also to work in concert to build their line between Gloucester and Cheltenham together, as their individually proposed alignments were almost identical.

In fact, the C&GWUR found itself in financial difficulty in 1837, and the B&GR feared that it would be unable to discharge the agreement to joint construction, so in 1838 the B&GR obtained an act enabling it to complete the construction alone. In fact the B&GR opened its line in November 1840. At this stage it did not get access to the docks at Gloucester and its Cheltenham station was not close to the centre of that town. The business of the tramroad therefore continued as vigorously as before.

Still the B&GR wished to find a means of getting access to the canal at Gloucester, and after considering ideas such as a carrier wagon on the tramway (to carry main line wagons) it was decided to extend the tramway to the B&GR Gloucester station; this was ready on 23 August 1841. This solution naturally required physical transshipment of goods at the Gloucester station and again at the canal wharf. Long timber, among other products, could not be handled on the tramway because of the sharp curves between buildings in the city.

In September 1843, the B&GR proposed laying standard gauge railway rails alongside and outside the plateway plates, enabling direct access to the docks for main line wagons over the tramroad route. By now the Great Western Railway had acquired the Cheltenham and Great Western Union Railway and construction of that line was now active. That being the case the GWR had the right to buy back the half share of the tramway, and the B&GR considered it advisable to consult the GWR on the dock access plans. Isambard Kingdom Brunel visited Gloucester in person to consider the matter and agreed, provided that broad gauge rails were laid as well as standard gauge, straddling the plateway track. This requirement, which would have involved a three-way mixed gauge, was not, in the event, proceeded with.

In the summer of 1844, the broad-gauge station at Gloucester was opened to another line, the Bristol and Gloucester Railway. In 1848 the B&GR opened an independent route to the docks, not involving the tramroad at all.

In January 1845, the Birmingham and Gloucester Railway was absorbed by the Midland Railway. In the same year, the GWR exercised its right to repurchase the half share of the tramroad. By 1847 conventional ("modern") locomotive traction was used on the tramroad in the docks area of Gloucester.

The South Wales Railway opened in July 1854 and the tramroad suffered a serious blow, as the Forest of Dean minerals could now come much more expeditiously by rail throughout. Its main business was now the conveyance of Leckhampton stone to Cheltenham, its advantage being that it could unload at any point along its line as compared with the Midland Railway which was obliged to do so at a goods depot.

Gloucester and Cheltenham Tramroads Abandonment Act 1859
- Act of Parliament
- Parliament of the United Kingdom
- Long title: An Act to authorize the Abandonment of the Gloucester and Cheltenham Tramroads, and to enable the Midland and the Great Western Railway Companies to sell and dispose of the same; and for other Purposes.
- Citation: 22 & 23 Vict. c. xl

Dates
- Royal assent: 1 August 1859

Street running in Gloucester and Cheltenham were no longer seen as acceptable and in any case the business of the tramroad was so low that its income barely covered costs. On 1 August 1859, the Gloucester and Cheltenham Tramroads Abandonment Act 1859 (22 & 23 Vict. c. xl) was obtained. There was some delay in actually dismantling the line, but the plates were recovered in the spring of 1861, having been sold by auction. (Note: The lines at Leckhampton were worked until 1924, but this refers to internal track in quarries used for manoeuvring wagons and descending the steepest part of the hill.)

== See also ==
- Leckhampton Hill and Charlton Kings Common
