= Leckhampton Court =

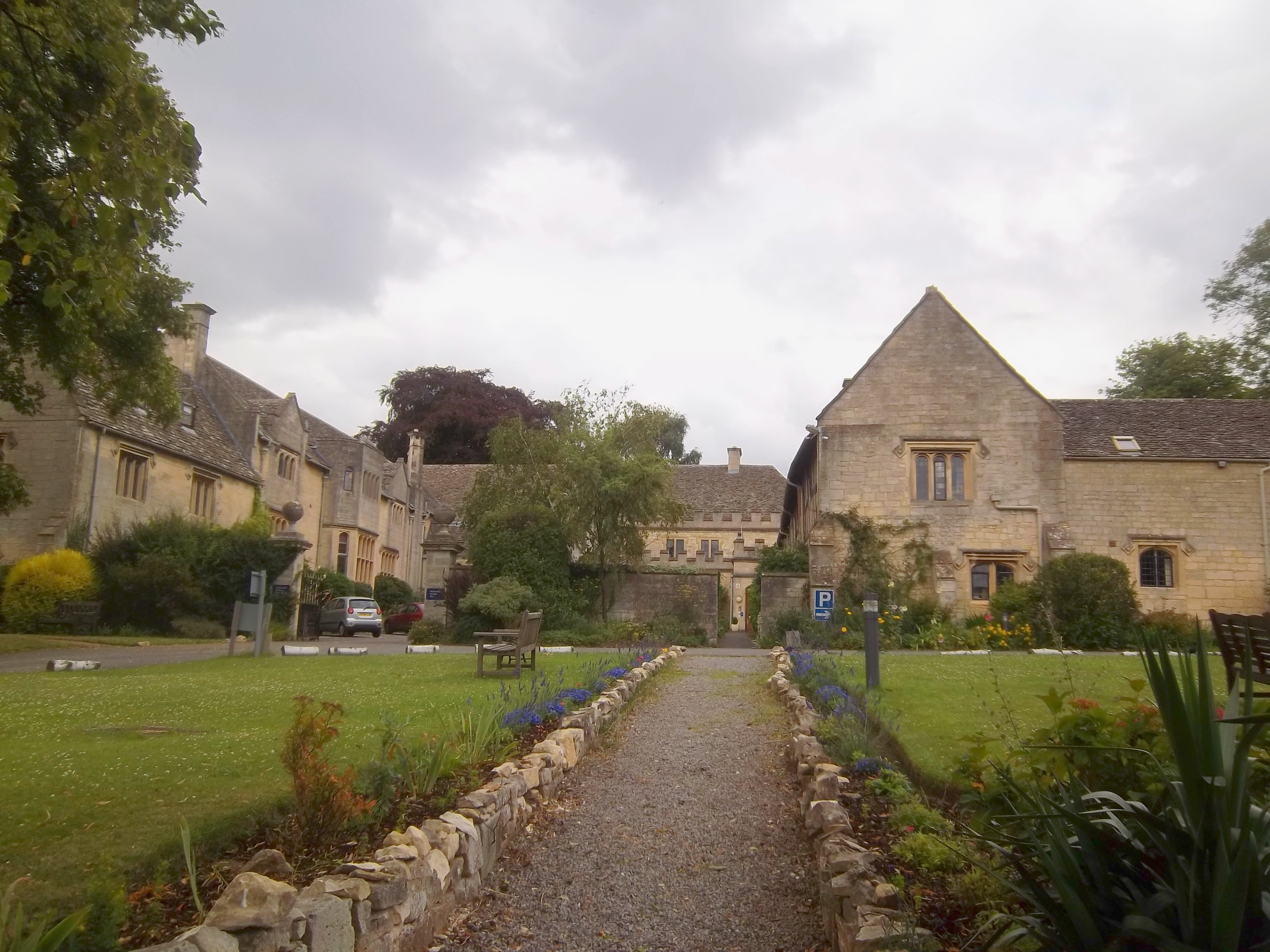
- Leckhampton Court from the front
- Location: Leckhampton, Cheltenham, Gloucestershire
- Coordinates: 51.87271°N 2.08073°W
- Built: circ. 1327 on the site of a previous manor house
- Built for: Sir John Gifford II (d.1330); William Norwood (d.1632); Thomas Norwood (d.1734); Charles Brandon Trye II (d.1884); John Hargreaves (d.1900)
- Restored: 1977-1981
- Restored by: Margaret Susan Cheshire, Baroness Ryder of Warsaw; Historic Buildings Council
- Governing body: Sue Ryder

Listed Building – Grade II*
- Official name: Leckhampton Court with Wall and Gate Piers
- Designated: 4 July 1960
- Reference no.: 1091754

Leckhampton Court is a Grade II* listed 14th-century manor house in Leckhampton, Cheltenham, Gloucestershire.

The current court was originally built for a branch of the wealthy Giffards of Brimpsfield Castle, and it would remain in the hands of their descendants for over five centuries; today the court is a part of Sue Ryder and is run as a hospice.

== History ==
=== 11th century ===
The earliest mention of Leckhampton is from the 9th century, referencing a royal manor in the vicinity. Though, by the time of Edward the Confessor, the royal manor had vanished, and the land in Leckhampton was split between three thanes, Osgot, Brictric, and Ordric.

By the recording of the Domesday Book in 1086, Brictric had managed to keep both his estate, and had been granted Ordric's land by William the Conqueror, this was to be the start of the manor estate that would later become Leckhampton Court. While the land belonging to Osgot was given to William Leuric, and it is thought likely that this second manor is related to the abandoned moated site that lies not far from the court. The moat is in the field opposite the west end of the church, probably pre-Saxon. It is an irregular four-sided fort, with a raised platform. There is some evidence of medieval buildings having once stood there. It stands on the western side of the old Sandford and Shurdington road, and many historians speculate that it may have served as a village fortress.

=== 12th Century ===
By the 12th Century, Leckhampton Manor was in the hands of the Norman family of Despenser, who gained their name from the role of dispensator, or steward, to the king. Not much is known of the court during this time, other than that the occupiers of the court had the right to appoint the parish priest.

In 1247, Henry III granted Cheltenham Manor, including Leckhampton Manor, to the Benedictine Abbey of Fécamp, in return for the port of Rye and Old Winchelsea. Although in the hands of the Despensers, Leckhampton court would remain the property of Fécamp until 1414, when, as a part of the Hundred Years' War, Henry V seized the land of foreign abbeys. This was not to last as the overlordship of Leckhampton was soon granted to Syon Abbey, who would hold it until it was dissolved in the Dissolution of the Monasteries by Henry VIII in 1539.

=== 14th century ===
In the early 14th century, Leckhampton Court had become the property of the Giffards of Brimpsfield Castle. It's not clear whether they bought the manor, or had gained it through marriage, though, they managed to retain it through their fall, after the head of the family, John Giffard, 2nd Lord of Brimpsfield rebelled against Edward II in 1322, leading to his execution, the destruction of Brimpsfield Castle, and the seizure of their lands.

This younger branch of the family managed to thrive at Leckhampton, and in about 1427 the hall, and nucleus of the current court was built, this was a simple two-storey hall, built from limestone.

In the parish church of St. Peter, there are two stone effigies that are believed to belong to Sir John Giffard II, and his wife, who are the people credited with having built the hall at Leckhampton.

=== 16th century ===
When another John Giffard dies in 1486, the manor passes to his daughter Eleanor, who marries the wealthy John Norwood, who is credited with building the timber-framed southern wing, and possibly the stone cottage-like building at the end of the northern wing, with twisted red-brick Tudor chimneys.

The Norwoods retained their wealth and connections, and one Henry Norwood was to marry Katherine Throckmorton, daughter of Sir Robert Throckmorton and Muriel Berkeley, the daughter of Thomas Berkeley, 5th Baron Berkeley. This marriage gave the family connections at court, as the Throckmortons were a powerful family, and were relations of Katherine Parr, the sixth and final wife of Henry VIII, Katherine, Henry Norwood's wife being a first cousin, once removed, of the queen.

Their son William modernised the central hall, adding new windows and chimneys; he was an active player in borough administration, and for a time held Cheltenham Manor. He married Elizabeth Lygon of Madresfield Court, and a brass plaque dedicated to them is in St. Peter's church.

=== 17th century ===
By the mid-17th century, the Norwood family had run into financial difficulty, and Francis Norwood, the owner of the manor sold it to his cousin Colonel Henry Norwood, a soldier who had fought for the royalist cause during the English Civil War, and had moved to the Americas, writing of the journey in his book, A Voyage to Virginia, and later becoming Lieutenant-Governor of Tangier. He returned to England in 1669, and took up residence in the court, playing an active part in local politics, becoming Mayor of Gloucester in 1672, and its Member of Parliament in 1675.

Henry died childless, and the manor returned to the hands of his cousin's children, one of whom was to rebuild the northern wing of the court after a fire in 1732, adding a three-storey Georgian mansion to the building.

=== 19th century ===
In 1797 the last Norwood died without issue, and the estate passed to a cousin, Charles Brandon Trye of Hempsted Court. Charles added some 200 acres to Leckhampton Court, and was the builder of a gravity-worked tramway to carry stone from Leckhampton Hill, to the rapidly growing Cheltenham Spa, the first known railway of its kind in Gloucestershire.

Charles' son took an active part in local politics, but went bankrupt in 1841 after speculating heavily in the development of the Bays Hill Estate in Cheltenham. The court was put up for auction, and was purchased by his brother, the Reverend Canon Charles Brandon Trye for £56,000. Canon Trye was responsible for building the first school in Leckhampton in 1841, twice enlarging the parish church, and actively pushed for the creation of a sister church, St. Philip and St. James.

Gradually the estate started struggling financially, with the quarries on Leckhampton Hill running at a loss, and despite heavy investment in them by Canon Trye's son Henry, output declined and he was forced to put Leckhampton Court Estate up for sale in 1894, finally leaving the hands of the descendants of Sir John Giffard II, builder of the original court, for the first time in over 560 years.

The court was purchased by John Hargreaves, who had married Edith Platt, an heiress of the Platt Brothers company. They appear to have extensively renovated the interior, adding the ornate mantlepiece in the newly rebuilt North Wing, built to replace the crumbling Georgian Mansion.

The Hargreaves entertained sumptuously, entertaining a number of notable guests at the court, most famously: Fredrick Roberts, 1st Earl Roberts, Henry Wellesley, 3rd Duke of Wellington, Charles Murray, 7th Earl of Dunmore, and Henry Somerset, 8th Duke of Beaufort. John died in 1900, leaving the court to his younger daughter Edith Muriel, who was to marry Colonel Cecil Ewles, son of the noted botanist Henry John Elwes.

=== 20th century ===
During the First World War the court was used as a Red Cross auxiliary hospital from 1915 to 1919, starting out with fifty beds, later expanding to 100 beds. During its time as a hospital, some 1,700 British, Commonwealth and Belgian soldiers were cared for; only two died. Ada Grace Ward, the commandant of Leckhampton Court Auxiliary Hospital, was awarded the MBE in the 1918 Birthday Honours.

During the Second World War the court was requisitioned by the War Office, and Nissen huts were erected in the grounds between the court and parish church. The camp originally started its life as a stopping place for Allied troops and a training ground, with American actor, Mickey Rooney stayed there for a time.

Between 1945 and 1948 the camp was used as PoW Camp 263, holding some 500 German prisoners of war. The PoWs constructed a small fountain that still stands in the centre of the camp.

After the end of the war the court was left in a state of poor condition, with the damage done during its requisition being more than the government was willing to pay out, and on Edith's death in 1955, it was put up for sale, and was turned into Leckhampton Court School in 1957 by Dr. Paul Saunders and his wife.

It was to remain a school until 1969 when Dr. Saunders became too busy to run the school with his wife as they became active participants in the campaign to save the Regency heart of Cheltenham from a planned 1960s redevelopment. In the years that followed the court suffered extensively from water damage and rot, leading to the decision to sell the Court to the Sue Ryder Foundation in 1976.

== Leckhampton Court today ==
In the present the Court functions as a hospice for Sue Ryder, and is Gloucestershire's only inpatient unit for specialist palliative care.

When it was first purchased by Lady Ryder in 1977, she had been looking for a suitable home to provide continued care for patients of the Radiotherapy Centre at Cheltenham General Hospital. With a grant from the Historic Buildings Council and many voluntary subscribers they were able to rescue the court and complete the extensive restoration that was needed.

The Tudor Southern Wing was completed in 1981, and the Northern Wing in 1983, bringing the number of beds up to forty-two.

In 1984 the home was visited by Diana, Princess of Wales, and later Prince and Princess Michael of Kent, and in 1986 Charles, Prince of Wales became the home's patron.

== See also ==
- Category: Country houses in Gloucestershire
- Leckhampton Hill and Charlton Kings Common
