= Higton =

Higton is a surname. Notable people with the surname include:

- John Higton (1775–1827), English animal painter
- William Higton (1796–1867), English clergyman and philanthropist

== See also ==
- Hinton (name)
