= Wheble =

Wheble is a surname. Notable people with the surname include:

- John Wheble (1746–1820), English printer, author, and antiquary
- Mick Wheble (1949–2023), British racing manager and charity advocate
