= Devil's Chimney =

Devil's Chimney or Devils Chimney may refer to:

- Devils Chimney, an Aboriginal place of significance in the Aberfoyle River gorge, New South Wales, Australia
- Devil's Chimney (Gloucestershire), a rock formation in Gloucestershire, UK
- Devil's Chimney (Isle of Wight), a rock cleft in the Isle of Wight, UK
- Devil's Chimney, a former rock formation at Beachy Head, East Sussex, UK
- Devil's Chimney, nickname for Sruth in Aghaidh an Aird, a waterfall in Ireland
