= John Higton =

English animal painter

- Born: 2 April 1775; Frederick County, Virginia
- Died: 23 December 1827 (aged 51); Southwark, London, England
- Known for: Animal painting
- Movement: English School
- Patrons: Lord Sedley (Henry Venables-Vernon, 3rd Baron Vernon); George Greville, 2nd Earl of Warwick

John Higton (2 April 1775 – 23 December 1827) was an English animal painter, who exhibited at the Royal Academy of Arts. He was a friend of Edward Dayes and Thomas Campbell, and his patrons included Lord Sedley (Henry Venables-Vernon, 3rd Baron Vernon) and George Greville, 2nd Earl of Warwick

== Early career ==
John Higton was born in Virginia in 1775, the son of John Higton, Sr. His father was a cotton planter and Loyalist, who served in Cornwallis' Central Division. John Higton, Sr. was granted land in Godmanchester, Quebec, but returned to Britain with Charles Cornwallis, 1st Marquess Cornwallis, and became a cotton merchant, establishing John Higton & Co in London and Manchester. While Higton considered himself an Englishman, he looked back on his boyhood in North America with fondness. He would recount his earliest memories were as a Hammerman assisting the Blacksmiths of the Division's Ordnance Corps tend the forge and horses.

Higton was privately educated, and was encouraged to paint from an early age by his father, who he succeeded in business. He was a follower of Edward Dayes, however it is thought he was given support to develop his own style and exhibit his paintings by Mr. Wheble, the editor of The Sporting Magazine, who said of him in 1813, whilst commenting on J. M. W. Turner and John Constable, that: "Portraits of Dogs at Ampthill Park - Both of these performances have merit. The last is to us, who have watched the improving style of Mr. Higton, a proof that perseverance and study will always be sure to succeed."

At around this time Higton also sketched/painted noted Pugilist and Corporal of Horse John Shaw, of the 2nd Life Guards, who life modelled for notable artists of the day, such as Sir Edwin Landseer, Benjamin Haydon, and William Etty. Shaw would go on to be exalted for his martial feats at the Battle of Waterloo, where he lost his life.

== Marriage and maturity ==
John fell in love with Mary Sheldon, the cousin of John Sheldon who was at that time Professor of Anatomy at the Royal Academy, and they were married in 1794. They lived in Southwark, London, and attended church at St Mary's, being acquainted with William Blake. Higton was well known to a number of publishers including Wheble and his friend John Nichols.

John and Mary had seven children, their oldest son John was born in 1795. He was raised with the expectation that he would run the family business. Of their other sons only William Higton lived to old age, whilst Richard, engraver & watercolourist, died in his mid thirties. In later life John and Mary are known to have been friends of Thomas Campbell, whose father had lived in Virginia and may have been a family friend, and his biographer William Beattie for whom Turner executed the plates.

By 1819 Mr. Brewster, Higton's business partner, had run up personal debts of £74,000. Brewster filed for bankruptcy, and his creditors turned to Higton to satisfy the debt. Higton contested joint liability, but was forced to sell his house on Cornhill, and family home and offices in Blackfriars and probably the Cotton Mill on Ancoats Lane, Manchester. This was detrimental to Higton's activity as an artist, and possibly his health. He died on 23 December 1827, being buried in the family plot at St Mary's, Newington.

== Patronage ==
Higton's patrons included Lord Sedley, for whom he executed a number of paintings, particularly relating to dogs, and George Greville, 2nd Earl of Warwick. It had also been speculated that John FitzPatrick, 2nd Earl of Upper Ossory was also a Patron given Higton's painting of Dogs at Ampthill Park. It was thought that Higton was introduced to George Greville by Lord Sedley, a friend of Charles Francis Greville. However it is now understood that Greville's wife, Henrietta Vernon, was a cousin of Lord Sedley (later Venables-Vernon) via her father Richard Vernon, and the half sister of John FitzPatrick, Lord Gowran (later 2nd Earl of Upper Ossory) via the first marriage of her Mother (Lady Evelyn Leveson-Gower). Therefore, Higton's portraits of Warwick Castle, combined with those of Dogs belonging to George Greville, Lord Sedley, and John Fitzpatrick, perhaps reflect a more intimate relationship with the family, and their circle, than was understood. The Greville's were acquainted to John Sheldon, Wheble and Nichols who were also Fellows of the Society of Antiquaries of London.

== Selected paintings ==
- Horses going to water (1801) -At Mr Stokes', Newington Causeway
- View of Warwick Castle (1807) -Crown Court, Blackfriars
- Portrait of a Dog, the property of Lord Sedley (Henry Venables-Vernon, 3rd Baron Vernon) (1808) -No 1 London Street
- Portrait of a Dog, the property of the Earl of Warwick (1810) -No 1 London Street
- Crab, A favourite terrier (1812) -No 1 London Street
- Portraits of dogs at Ampthill park (1813) -No 1 London Street
- Interior of a country publichouse (1813) - a sketch - engraved by W.Ward -No 1 London Street
- Landscape and cattle (1813) -No 1 London Street
