= Leckhampton Hill and Charlton Kings Common =

Protected area in Gloucestershire, England

- Site of Special Scientific Interest
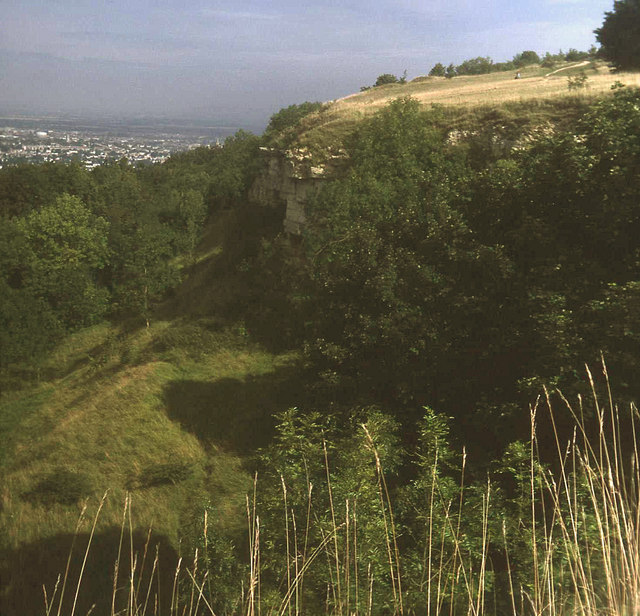
- Cliff face on Leckhampton Hill
- Location of Leckhampton Hill and Charlton Kings Common.
- Area of search: Gloucestershire
- Grid reference: SO952187
- Coordinates: 51.867306°N 2.070391°W
- Interest: Biological/Geological
- Area: 63.8 ha (158 acres)
- Notification date: 1954

Leckhampton Hill and Charlton Kings Common (grid reference SO952187) is a 63.8-hectare (158-acre) biological and geological Site of Special Scientific Interest in Gloucestershire, notified in 1954.

In 2026 the site, identified as The Cheltenham Escarpment, was declared a National Nature Reserve.

The site is listed in the 'Cotswold District' Local Plan 2001-2011 (on line) as a Key Wildlife Site (KWS).

A notable feature of the area is the Devil’s Chimney, a man-made pillar outcrop on the west side of the site.

== Location ==
The site is in the Cotswold Area of Outstanding Natural Beauty and is one of a series of unimproved Jurassic limestone grassland area which are located along the Cotswold scarp. It is south of Cheltenham and near the communities of Leckhampton and Charlton Kings, and has a north-facing aspect. The site also includes disused quarry faces, and quarry spoil which has been vegetated.

== Geology ==
Leckhampton Hill comprises a flat-topped plateau, reaching a maximum height of 293 metres (961 ft) ASL. Four main horizontal rock strata form it. These are all limestones of the Middle Jurassic Inferior Oolite sequence. The Leckhampton quarries expose the thickest single cross-section through the sequence of the area. Strata of some 60 metres (197 ft) are exposed, and the large outcrops are of significant importance to those studying palaeontology or sedimentology, and for studying ancient environments generally. Below the rock strata are the Lias clays. The Lower Lias form the valley floor, the marlstones of the Middle Lias form a prominent shelf that now carries the Leckhampton Hill road which passes to the west of the hill, below the Devil’s Chimney. The hill itself is formed of a series of limestones of similar age, but quite distinct appearance (from the base upwards): the lower limestones, pea grit, freestone and ragstones. There is also a variation in colour from a pale cream in the upper ragstones down to a russet brown at the base, owing to a higher iron content.

Heading up the former route of the standard gauge railway from Daisy Bank Road, the lower slopes are planted with trees to stabilise the soil. The ground in this area is hummocky as a result of the slippage downhill of Upper Lias sands and blocks of limestone over Upper Lias clays which act as a weak lubricated layer. Some earthworks of the old tramways can be seen at this point, past the lime kilns.

Behind the lime kilns, a 10 m (33 ft) bed of the pisolitic pea grit forms a steeper but crumbly cliff. This is a distinctive and well-known exposure for the Cotswold oolites, which here form ovoid pisoliths the size of a pea. The mechanism of oolite formation is like that of a pearl, where material is progressively deposited around some initial seed fragment. In these rocks, the seeds have been identified as filaments of the algae Girvanella pisolitica.

Below the pea grit is the Whitby mudstone formation which forms the uppermost part of the Lias group. An angular unconformity is visible at this location, indicating the partial erosion of the mudstone before the deposition of the overlying limestones as a result of a fall in the sea level.

Above the pea grits are two layers of freestone, separated by a band of oolitic marl, forming a series around 30 m (98 ft) thick, or deeper elsewhere in the area. Although all the limestones here have been quarried for lime burning, it was these freestones that formed the most valuable stone, and the main reason for quarrying at this location. These freestones, like those mined around Bath, were cut and worked 'green', i.e. still damp from the ground. As they dried out, a layer of calcium carbonate formed on the surface which has a protective effect against chemical erosion. Removing this layer accelerates erosion. The freestones show clear current bedding, although some examples are so pronounced that it could form a weak spot and make the stone less useful for stonemasonry.

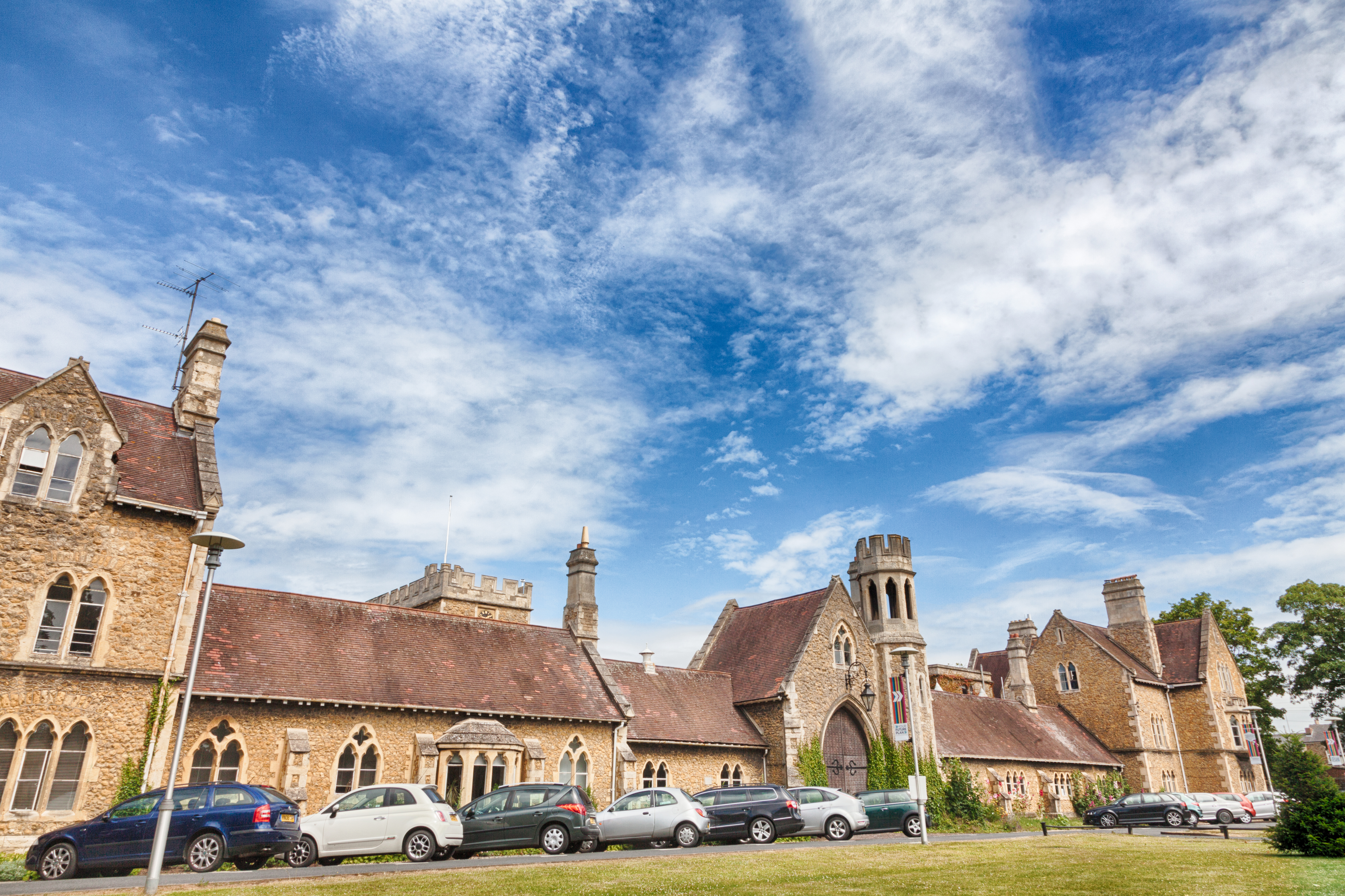
Francis Close Hall of St Paul's College, showing the Neo Gothic and rubble masonry style, using two distinct stones from Leckhampton Quarry

Above the freestones are the ragstones, about 6 to 9 m (20 to 30 ft) thick. These split easily into flat pieces and are more easily quarried than the freestones, but were less valuable. They were used locally for dry stone walling and for building in rubble masonry or Neo Gothic styles, such as at St Pauls College. These ragstones are classed as shelly limestones, being fossiliferous with Gryphaea and Trigonia bivalves. Although the main plateau of the hill is at 275 m (902 ft) elevation, quarrying of the ragstone and upper freestone has been so extensive as to have formed a second plateau below this, around the perimeter of the hill.

At the south-west corner of the site, the smaller workings of Salterley Quarry form another exposure of the freestone. Movement of these rocks over the pea grit beneath has opened up much of their vertical jointing into fissures, some of which even show travertine deposits, although not in a commercially significant quantity. Some of the blocks between the fissures may, in time, separate sufficiently to indicate a possible formation mechanism for a column like the Devil’s Chimney similar to that associated with hoodoos.

== Quarrying ==
Georgian Cheltenham was largely built with stone from the quarries of Leckhampton Hill. The oolitic limestone higher up the hill is a freestone of good quality for dressed stonework. Quarrying here was probably ancient, but it was expensive to transport the stone as the hill was too steep to allow stone to be carried by carts until it had been carried down to Leckhampton Hill road. The first industrial-era quarry began shortly after 1797 when the Cheltenham surgeon Charles Brandon Trye inherited the estate of Leckhampton Court. Soon afterwards, by 1803, he had constructed the first rope-worked incline from the road to the quarry atop the hill, passing just behind the Chimney. Bick dates the Chimney to before 1803 and reports that a Leckhampton antiquarian Alfred Bendall dated it to before 1795.

The Gloucester and Cheltenham Tramroad was formed in 1809 and included a branch southwards 4.4 kilometres (2.7 mi) to the foot of Leckhampton Hill, with Trye extending his tramway to join it by constructing two more rope-worked inclines, Middle and Bottom, with a descent of 113 metres (371 ft) and a total length of 870 metres (951 yd), costing Trye £1,900. Bottom incline ended just north of the reservoir on the west side of Leckhampton Road, near the junction with Old Bath Road. A limekiln, tramway stables and depot were at that location at 51.87363°N 2.07665°W.

These inclines were designed by John Hodgkinson, the engineer of the Tramroad, who may also have designed the first incline. Although the utility of these new tramroads and inclines for the supply of building stone was welcomed in the Cheltenham Chronicle on their completion in April 1810, Trye did not live to see their benefits, as he died in 1811. After the opening of the tramroad, the price of dressed stone blocks in Cheltenham had dropped to just 1d per ton.

Once the Tramroad was in operation, stone for Cheltenham was taken by that route and the original incline to the Leckhampton Hill road was less important, and closed by about 1830. The quarries and inclines were still expanding though and another incline, the so-called Top Incline, was constructed to the east. This may have re-used equipment taken from the closure of the original incline.

The quarries were the site of riots in 1902 and 1906, where many thousands of people protested about the loss of access to the hill. See The Leckhampton Riots.

In 1922 the owners of the quarry began a project to build four lime kilns at the top of Middle incline with a standard gauge railway transporting the lime down the hill to join the Great Western Railway line at Charlton Kings. The work was completed in 1924, however it was not a commercial success and production stopped two years later. A fuller description of the industrial archaeology on Leckhampton Hill can be seen in an extract from the Gloucestershire Society for Industrial Archaeology Journal for 2001.

== Biology ==
The site supports a range of habitats which include unimproved calcareous grassland, woodland and scrub, cliff faces and scree slopes. The grassland is of major importance and it comprises a tall ungrazed sward. This is dominated by tor-grass, upright brome, meadow oat-grass, sweet vernal-grass and quaking grass. It is noted for its range of herbs which include salad burnet, common rock-rose, common bird's-foot-trefoil. The quarry floors support wild thyme, dwarf thistle, yellow-wort and autumn gentian. The site supports many plants which are scarce at a national or county level. These include fly orchid, musk orchid and purple milk-vetch. It is one of a small number of sites which support meadow clary in the county.

Shrub areas support nesting birds such as meadow pipit and grasshopper warbler. It is a shelter area for invertebrates and small mammals.

There are wooded areas of broad-leaved and coniferous trees including mature beech. These areas support a woodland flora such as ivy broomrape, white helleborine and greater butterfly-orchid.

There is a reported population of adder.

== Land ownership ==
Leckhampton Hill and Charlton Kings Common SSSI is owned and managed by the Cheltenham Borough Council (CBC). A volunteer group, the Friends of Leckhampton Hill and Charlton Kings Common (FOLK), work alongside the CBC to manage and promote the use of the site.

== See also ==
- Devil's Chimney (Gloucestershire) – Rock formation on Leckhampton Hill, south of Cheltenham, Gloucestershire, England
