= Leckhampton with Warden Hill =

Parish in Gloucestershire, England

Coordinates: 51.8792°N 2.0789°W

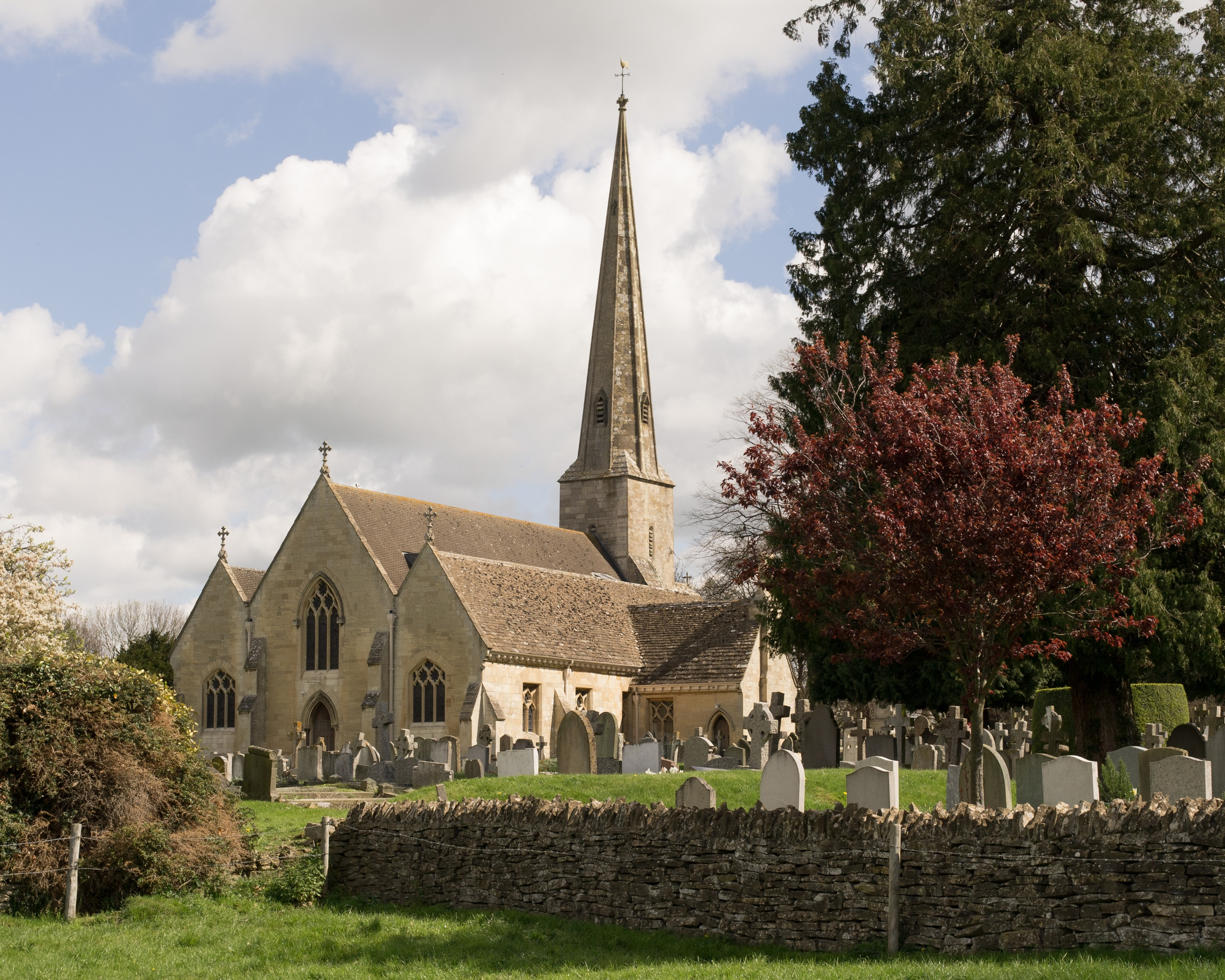

- Location within Gloucestershire
- Population: 4,409 (2011 census)
- Civil parish: Leckhampton with Warden Hill
- District: Cheltenham
- Shire county: Gloucestershire
- Region: South West
- Country: England
- Sovereign state: United Kingdom
- Website: www.leckhamptonwithwardenhill-pc.gov.uk

Leckhampton with Warden Hill, formerly just Leckhampton is a civil parish in Cheltenham, Gloucestershire, England. It comprises the village of Leckhampton and the area of Warden Hill. It has a parish council. The population of the civil parish of Leckhampton taken at the 2011 census was 4,409, and its area at that time was 180.5 ha (0.697 sq mi). The parish was expanded under the Cheltenham Borough Council (Reorganisation of Community Governance) (Leckhampton with Warden Hill Parish) Order 2018, to include an area to the north of its earlier boundaries. On 1 January 2019 the expanded parish was renamed from "Leckhampton" to "Leckhampton with Warden Hill".
