= Leckhampton Players =

The Leckhampton Players is an amateur dramatics company based in Leckhampton, near Cheltenham. Founded in 1947, it performs regularly at Leckhampton Village Hall. Productions typically include a pantomime in January/February each year, a musical show in May/June, and a play (most often comedy/farce) in October. The Players celebrated its fiftieth anniversary in 1997.

The Players won the Gloucestershire Drama Association award for Best Pantomime in 2000, 2001 and 2006.

== Historical Productions ==
- 1970 Puss in Boots
- Productions since 1975

== Recent Productions ==
- 2011 Old Time Music Hall
- 2011 Mother Goose
- 2010 S(w)inging the 60's
- 2010 Dry Rot
- 2010 Dick Whittington
- 2009 Hello & Goodbye
- 2009 Viva Mexico
- 2009 Raise the Roof (charity fundraising concert)
- 2009 The Wizard of Oz
- 2008 Kindly Keep It Covered
- 2008 From Stage to Screen
- 2008 Ali Baba and the Forty Thieves
- 2007 Murder in Play
- 2007 Murder at the Music Hall
- 2007 Frankenstein - The Panto
- 2006 Inspector Drake and the Perfekt Crime
- 2006 Wild Wild Women
- 2006 Cinderella
