= John Wheble =

English printer, author and antiquary

- Born: 2 February 1746; Gatcombe, Isle of Wight
- Died: 22 September 1820 (aged 74); Bromley, Kent
- Occupations: printer; antiquary
- Writing career
- Genre: News
- Notable works: The Middlesex Journal; The County Chronicle; The Sporting Magazine

John Wheble (2 February 1746 – 22 September 1820) was an English printer, author and antiquary.

== Early life and apprenticeship ==
He was born in Gatcombe, Isle of Wight in 1746. He was twice married, leaving a widow. Wheble was apprenticed in 1756 to "the well known bookseller, and publisher", John Wilkie, whom he eventually succeeded.

== Literary career ==
Wheble is most famous for his association with John Horne Tooke and John Wilkes, and the Society of Gentlemen Supporters of the Bill of Rights, having printed pamphlets for them, and publishing articles in The Middlesex Journal in their defence.

Matters came to a head on 21 February 1771 when the Speaker of the House of Commons summoned Wheble to Parliament to explain why he had printed a full account of debates in the house, which was at that time against the law. A proclamation for him to appear in Parliament was also made in the name of King George, with a reward of £50 offered for his apprehension.

At this development Wilkes concocted a plan to have Wheble brought before him in his capacity as sitting Alderman / Magistrate by a mutual friend (Twine Carpenter), so that the charges made by Parliament against him could be dismissed. In his letter to the Secretary of State, Lord Halifax, Wilkes wrote "That Wheble had been apprehended in violation of the rights of an Englishman, as well as of the chartered privileges of a Citizen of London"

For his services in these affairs Wheble was granted 100 guineas by the Constitutional Society, and received the thanks of the Corporation of London.

He was the projector of The Middlesex Journal and The County Chronicle, and with Mr Harris co-founded The Sporting Magazine. He was a close friend of John Nichols, and a friend and mentor to artists such as William Ward, John Constable, Joseph Turner and John Higton.

== Other achievements ==
Wheble held a Commission in the Commissariat, was a fellow of the Society of Antiquaries, was for 16 years a Councillor for the Ward of Farringdon in the City of London, and a Freeman of London and a member of the Stationers' Company.

== Bibliography ==
A full "Memoir of John Wheble" by John Nichols is contained in the Gentleman's Magazine. See also Robert Cradock Nichols, Memoir of the late John Gough Nichols, F.S.A. (1874).

== Sources ==
=== Primary sources ===
- Nichols, John (1812). Literary Anecdotes of the Eighteenth Century. Vol. III. London: Nichols, Son, and Bentley. p. 261.
