= St Philip and St James Church, Leckhampton =

Church in Cheltenham, Gloucestershire, England

Coordinates: 51°53′19″N 2°4′55″W

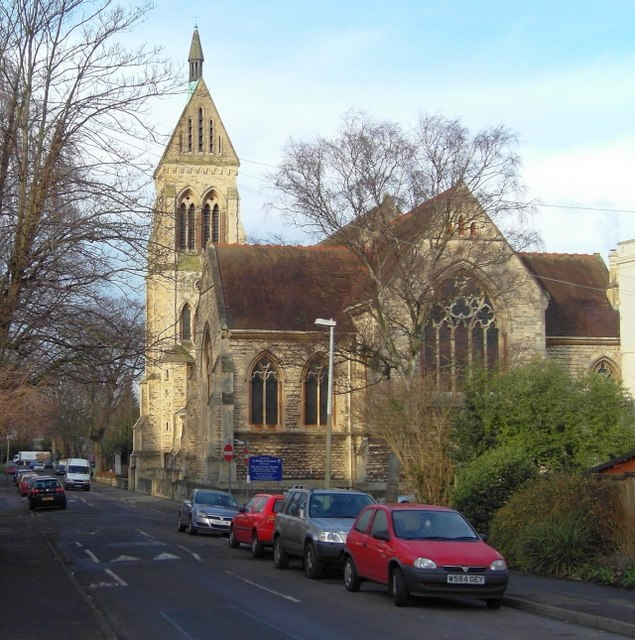
St Philip and St James, Leckhampton

St Philip & St James, Leckhampton is a parish in south Cheltenham, in the English county of Gloucestershire. Part of the Anglican Diocese of Gloucester, the church has been a centre for worship for more than 150 years and has a present congregational roll of over 200.

== History ==
On 1 May 1840 the church of St Philip was consecrated as a daughter church of St Peter's and a priest in charge was approved. In 1869, St Philip's was granted separate parish status, and the first vicar was appointed in May that year.

Ten years later, the church was found to be too small for the expanding parish and the present church of St Philip & St James was built around the existing one by partly rebuilding and extending it. This work took three years. In May 1882 the present building was consecrated by the Bishop of Gloucester, but the building had no spire - the proposed one had been found to be beyond the bearing capacity of the foundations. In 1903 the saddleback tower was built in place of the spire and dedicated.

The church is in the Victorian Gothic style, with a fine carved stone reredos in the chancel and a mural of the supper at Emmaus in the side chapel. Until their removal in 2020, the pews in the nave and aisles had carved end panels, some of which had been ingeniously incorporated into a new vestry at the back of the church. There is a movable nave altar on a dais, though the high altar is still in occasional use. The font was recently moved to the centre of the back of the church, having spent some years in the north-west corner.

In 1963 a columbarium was built in the crypt of St Philip & St James where ashes of the departed can rest, the first of its kind in the United Kingdom.

By 1982 the parish of St Philip & St James had incorporated that of the former church of St James, Suffolk Square (at first used as a parish hall, but now a pizza restaurant). It now forms part of the South Cheltenham Team of churches whose Rector is also vicar of one of the churches in the team.

In 2018, the church received permission to modernise its interior, removing the pews and converting the nave into a multi-use space while leaving the chancel and high altar in their historic configuration. Construction work began in January 2020.

== Church community ==
Worship at St Philip & St James is a mixture of formal and less formal styles. There is a pipe organ and a robed adult choir, occasionally supplemented by a music group with mostly acoustic instruments. The preaching mainly reflects a moderate liberal tradition. The current vicar is Revd Ruth Edmonds.
