= St Peter's Church, Leckhampton =

Church in Gloucestershire, England

Coordinates: 51°52′21.5″N 2°5′14″W

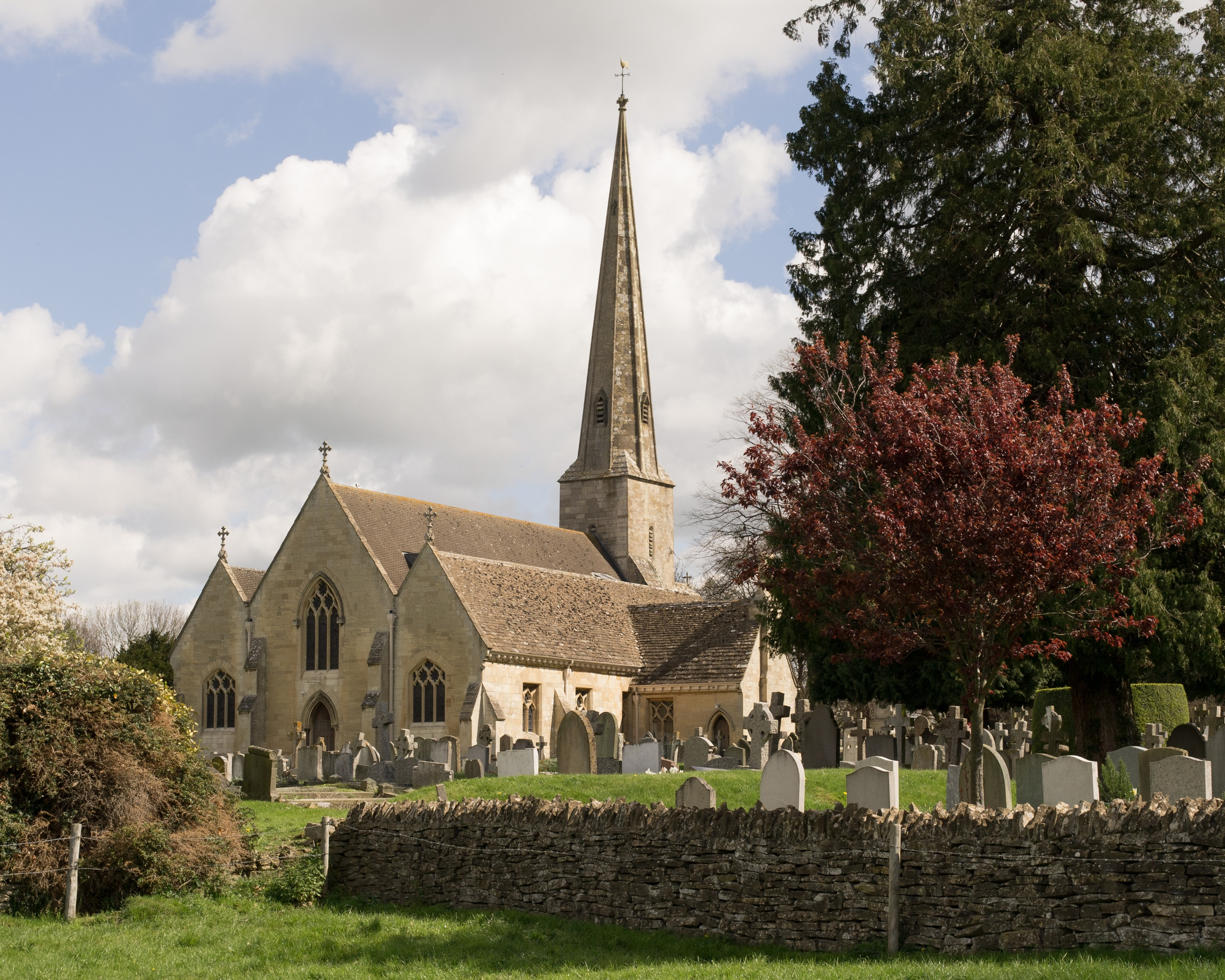
Church of St Peter, Leckhampton

St Peter's Church, Leckhampton is the Church of England parish church in Leckhampton, Cheltenham, Gloucestershire, England. The church belongs to the Diocese of Gloucester, and is a member of the developing group of South Cheltenham Churches along with St Philip and St James Church, Leckhampton, St Christopher, Warden Hill, and St Stephen's and Emmanuel.

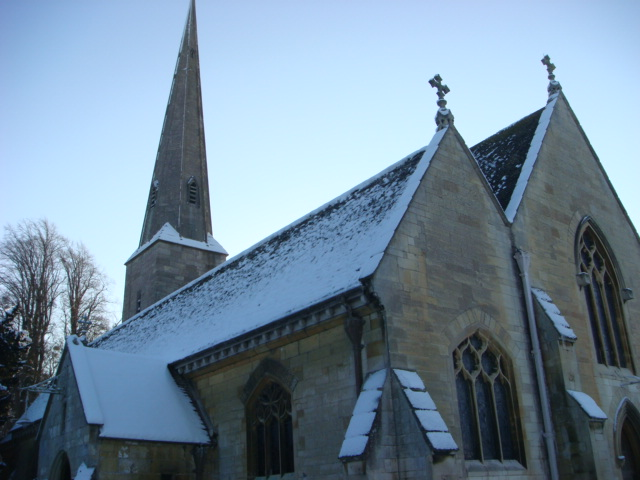
St Peter's Church from the south-east

== History ==
The present church, including the nave, sanctuary, south aisle, and spire, is thought to have been built by Sir John Giffard, Lord of the manor of Leckhampton, in the 14th century. He and his wife are commemorated by effigies in the church. There must have been an earlier church on the site, since in 1162 one of its priests was fined two shillings for non-payment of dues to the Canons of Cirencester Abbey by Archbishop Thomas Becket.

The church was enlarged in the 1860s by the addition of a north aisle and the lengthening of the nave at the west end, under the direction of the architect John Middleton. With the expansion of the local population, part of the medieval parish containing much of the 19th century residential development was detached to form the new parish of St Philip and St James.

The church has a ring of eight bells, and an organ built by Hill, Norman and Beard in 1936 (modified 2000). The churchyard contains a memorial to Dr Edward Wilson, who died on Scott's last Antarctic expedition. Also buried here are Major Henry Duberly (1822–1890) and his wife Fanny Duberly (1829–1902), who accompanied her husband during the Crimean War and the Indian Mutiny.

The churchyard contains the war graves of eight service personnel of World War I and three of World War II.

== See also ==
- Leckhampton Court
