= Charles Brandon Trye =

English surgeon (1757–1811)

Charles Brandon Trye (1757–1811) was an English surgeon.

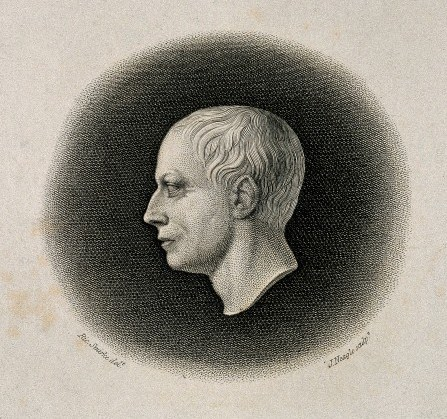
Charles Brandon Trye, engraving by James Neagle of the memorial-bust by Charles Rossi

== Life ==
He was elder son of John Trye, rector of Leckhampton, near Cheltenham, by his wife Mary, daughter of the Rev. John Longford of Haresfield, near Stroud, born on 21 August 1757. His parents died while he was at Cirencester grammar school.

Trye was apprenticed in March 1773 to Thomas Hallward, an apothecary in Worcester, and in 1778 he became a pupil of William Russell, then senior surgeon to the Worcester Infirmary. At the end of his indenture in January 1780 he came to London to study under John Hunter, and was appointed house apothecary or house surgeon to the Westminster Hospital. There he came under the influence of Henry Watson, the surgeon and professor of anatomy at the Royal Academy. He acted as house surgeon for about 18 months, and worked as a dissector. John Sheldon engaged him to assist in his private anatomical school in Great Queen Street.

Sheldon descended into mental illness and left London, and Trye returned to Gloucester, where he was appointed house apothecary to the infirmary on 27 January 1783; shortly after leaving this post he was elected in July 1784 surgeon to the charity, a position he filled until 1810. He was admitted a member of the Corporation of Surgeons on 4 March 1784. In 1793 he established, in conjunction with the Rev. Thomas Stock, a lying-in charity in Gloucester, which was initially run by them for seven years almost entirely at their own expense.

In 1797 Trye succeeded under the will of his cousin, Henry Norwood, to an estate in the parish of Leckhampton, near Cheltenham, but he still continued to practise his profession, the rents going to the payment of his cousin's debts. He opened up the stone quarries at Leckhampton Hill, and constructed a branch tramway, opened on 10 July 1810, to bring the stone from the quarries to within reach of the River Severn at Gloucester. He was admitted a Fellow of the Royal Society on 17 December 1807, and at the time of his death he was a member of the Royal Medical Society of Edinburgh. Trye was a promoter of vaccination, well regarded by Edward Jenner.

Trye died on 7 October 1811, and was buried in the churchyard at St Mary de Crypt Church, Gloucester. A plain tablet, with an inscription prepared by Trye himself, was put up in the church at Leckhampton, while a public memorial to perpetuate his memory was placed in Gloucester Cathedral, a medallion-bust of Trye by Charles Rossi in the west end of the north aisle. Trye's library of medical books was sold at auction by Leigh & Sotheby on 22 January 1813 and five following days (along with the collections of several other individuals); a copy of the catalogue is held at Cambridge University Library (shelfmark Munby.c.159(2)).

== Works ==
Trye published:

- Remarks on Morbid Retentions of the Urine, Gloucester, 1774; another edition, 1784.
- Review of Jesse Foote's Observations on the Opinions of John Hunter on the Venereal Disease, London, 1787. The work for which Trye is remembered, it is a defence of his old master against the attacks of his enemy Jesse Foot.
- An Essay on the Swelling of the Lower Extremities incident to Lying-in Women, London, 1792.
- Illustrations of some of the Injuries to which the Lower Limbs are exposed, London, 1802.
- Essay on some of the Stages of the Operation of cutting for Stone, London, 1811.

== Family ==
Trye married, in May 1792, Mary (d. 1848), sister of Samuel Lysons, by whom he had ten children. Of them, three sons and five daughters survived him. Daniel Lysons, also a brother-in-law, was Trye's biographer.

== Notes ==
Attribution

This article incorporates text from a publication now in the public domain: Lee, Sidney, ed. (1899). "Trye, Charles Brandon". Dictionary of National Biography. Vol. 57. London: Smith, Elder & Co.
