= John Nichols (printer) =

English printer, author and antiquarian (1745–1826)

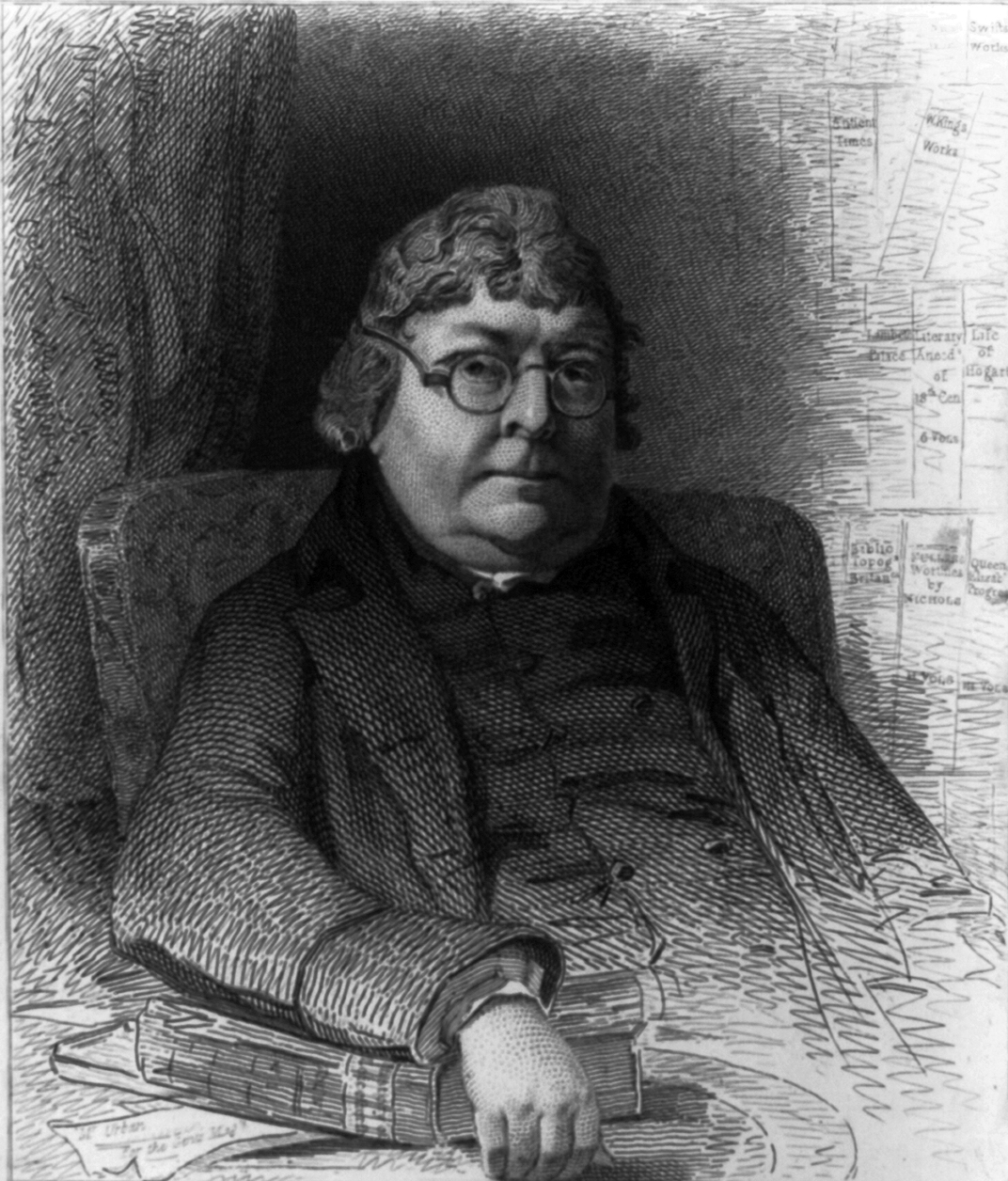
- John Nichols
- Born: 2 February 1745; Islington, London, England
- Died: 26 November 1826 (aged 81)
- Occupations: printer; antiquary
- Writing career
- Genre: history
- Notable works: Literary Anecdotes of the Eighteenth Century; History and Antiquities of the County of Leicester

John Nichols (2 February 1745 – 26 November 1826) was an English printer, author and antiquary. He is remembered as an influential editor of the Gentleman's Magazine for nearly 40 years; author of a monumental county history of Leicestershire; author of two compendia of biographical material relating to his literary contemporaries; and as one of the agents behind the first complete publication of Domesday Book in 1783.

== Early life and apprenticeship ==
He was born in Islington, London, to Edward Nichols and Anne Wilmot. On 22 June 1766 he married Anne, daughter of William Cradock. Anne bore him three children: Anne (1767), Sarah (1769), and William Bowyer (born 1775 and died a year later). His wife Anne also died in 1776. Nichols was married a second time in 1778, to Martha Green, who bore him eight children. Nichols was taken for training by "the learned printer", William Bowyer the Younger in early 1757. Nichols was formally apprenticed in February 1759 by Bowyer, whom he eventually succeeded. On the death of his friend and master in 1777 he published a brief memoir, which afterwards grew into the Anecdotes of William Bowyer and his Literary Friends (1782).

== Literary career ==
In 1788, he became editor of the Gentleman's Magazine and remained so until his death. In that periodical, and in his numerous volumes of Anecdotes and Illustrations, he made numerous contributions to literary biography. As his materials accumulated he compiled a sort of anecdotal literary history of the century, based on a large collection of letters. The Literary Anecdotes of the Eighteenth Century (1812–15, nine volumes), into which the original work was expanded, formed only a small part of Nichols's production.

Considered one of his most important works, Nichols's monumental History and Antiquities of the County of Leicester, was the most ambitious of the antiquarian county histories (extremely long, but the quality of the content is very variable), a massive compendium of historical notes, manuscripts and engraved plates printed by subscription after an exhaustive survey of the county, and published in eight parts not in chronological order to make up four volumes when complete, from 1795 to 1815. It was followed by the Illustrations of the Literary History of the Eighteenth Century, consisting of Authentic Memoirs and Original Letters of Eminent Persons, which was begun in 1817 and completed by his son John Bowyer Nichols (1779–1863) in 1858. The Anecdotes and the Illustrations are mines of valuable information on the authors, printers and booksellers of the time.

== Nichols and the printing of Domesday Book (1767–83) ==
Nichols co-operated with Abraham Farley in the production of the 1783 edition of Domesday Book, which he called in his Literary Anecdotes "the most invaluable as well as most antient Record in this or any other kingdom". Between Farley's appointment as co-editor of the project in 1770 and the final publication of Domesday Book in two volumes in 1783, Nichols assisted Farley in printing and proof-reading the text, and also designed the special "record type" typeface that was to be used. This was a source of lasting pride to him; he would later say "on the correctness and the beauty of this important Work I am content to stake my typographical credit".

The types created by Nichols for the Domesday project were destroyed, alongside much else of value, in a fire at his office in February 1808.

== Other works ==
- History and Antiquities of the County of Leicester, I.i (City of Leicester, start), I.ii (City of Leicester, and Indices); II.i (Framland Hundred), II.ii (Gartre Hundred); III.i (East Goscote Hundred), III.ii (West Goscote Hundred); IV.i (Guthlaxton Hundred), IV.ii (Sparkenhoe Hundred). (University of Leicester, Special Collections)
- The Literary Anecdotes of the Eighteenth Century, 9 volumes (Second edition, 1812–1816): All Volumes at HathiTrust, open.
- Illustrations of the Literary History of the Eighteenth Century, 8 volumes (1817–1858), 7 & 8 by J. Bowyer Nichols (1848, 1858): Volumes 1 to 6, and Volume 8 (New York Public Library/HathiTrust, open). Volume 7 (Internet Archive).
- A Collection of Royal and Noble Wills (1780), Internet Archive
- A Select Collection of Poems (1780–82), with subsequent additions, in which he was helped by Joseph Warton and by Bishops Percy and Lowth
- History and Antiquities of the Town of Hinckley, in the County of Leicester (1782) at Google, and Internet Archive.
- Bibliotheca Topographica Britannica (1780–90), Volumes 1 to 6, and Volume 8 (University of California/HathiTrust, open). Volume 7 at Google.
- The Progresses and Public Processions of Queen Elizabeth (1788), with Richard Gough

Nichols was a fellow of the Society of Antiquaries, a trustee of many City of London institutions, and in 1804 he was master of the Stationers' Company.

== Heirs and successors ==
John Bowyer Nichols continued his father's various undertakings, and wrote, with other works, A Brief Account of the Guildhall of the City of London (1819).

John Gough Nichols (1806–73), John Bowyer Nichols's eldest son, was also a printer and a distinguished antiquary. He edited the Gentleman's Magazine from 1851 to 1856 and The Herald and Genealogist from 1863 to 1874, and was one of the founders of the Camden Society.

It is understood that William Nichols Higton was given his middle name by his father, the artist John Higton, in honour of their friendship, and that Nichols was his godfather.

== Bibliography ==
A full "Memoir of John Nichols" by Alexander Chalmers is contained in the Illustrations, and a bibliography in the Anecdotes (vol. vi.) is supplemented in the later work. See also Robert Cradock Nichols, Memoir of the late John Gough Nichols, F.S.A. (1874).

== Sources ==
=== Primary sources ===
- Nichols, John (1812). Literary Anecdotes of the Eighteenth Century. Vol. III. London: Nichols, Son, and Bentley. p. 261.
