= The Sporting Magazine =

English sports magazine (1792–1870)

- Frequency: Monthly
- First issue: 1792
- Final issue: 1870
- Country: United Kingdom
- Language: English

The Sporting Magazine (1792–1870) was the first English sporting periodical to devote itself to every type of sport. Its subtitle was "Monthly Calendar of the Transactions of the Turf, the Chase and Every Other Diversion Interesting to the Man of Pleasure, Enterprize, and Spirit".

== History ==
The Sporting Magazine was established in 1792. The magazine was published in London, but was able to offer extensive coverage of events nationally because the editor, John Wheble, had established a wide-ranging network of informants, writers and contributors throughout the shires.

Much of the information in the magazine stemmed from the readers themselves, who were urged to contribute material. The editor insisted that information should be accurate, rejecting contributions where he had doubts. Readers would also respond to one another's letters and sharp debates often occurred within the magazine's columns, acting as an additional check on the accuracy of material. The editor refused to settle disputes, but was very conscientious in supplying the best information available. Cumulatively, this provided an immense amount of detail. The journal transformed the subject by providing a treatment that was both deeper and more wide reaching in scope. Unlike its predecessors, it embraced everything that was regarded as sport and aimed at presenting an accurate, accessible record. By doing so, it mapped the subject out, presenting a thematic framework, which others were to develop. A range of issues that were to become associated with established sporting literature first became accessible to a wider audience via its columns.

By the early 1820s, the magazine was the fourth best-selling monthly periodical in London. However, it was still badly organized, information on varying topics simply being heaped together. Occasionally the magazine would copy articles from newspapers, but the coverage it offered was excellent, embodied by the detailed calendar of forthcoming events that appeared every month. Improvements in communications generated rapid information dissemination and this inevitably favoured daily and weekly periodicals over monthly ones, especially those that began devoting serious coverage to sport.

Consequently, sales of the magazine shrank to just 1,500 by 1822, leading to the editor to introduce a new approach to the subject matter. From 1819 fox-hunting had been given increasing coverage, with the first comprehensive list of British packs appearing two years later. However, it was the editor's decision to employ the author Nimrod at lavish cost, from 1822 to 1827, to furnish beautifully written pieces on fox-hunting, that commenced the transformation of the magazine. Despite an increase in price, Nimrod's articles increased sales, which soon doubled, inevitably leading the magazine to pay still greater attention to fox-hunting. Nonetheless, contents remained quite varied, including, for instance, dog fighting. In addition, coverage became more contemporary and the layout improved.

The magazine, followed by other papers, began to denounce cruelty to animals, such as, pigeon shooting, cock-fighting and horse feats, and encouraged action against them.

Duelling between gentleman protagonists with pistols or swords was so common at the time, that the magazine had a regular monthly column called "Affairs of Honour" devoted to duels.

== External Sources ==
- Link to the first bound volume of The Sporting Magazine, Oct 1792 - Mar 1793
- Link to the online archive of issues of The Sporting Magazine at Babel.Hathitrust.org
