= John Sheldon (anatomist) =

English surgeon and anatomist

John Sheldon (6 July 1752 – 8 October 1808) was an English surgeon and anatomist.

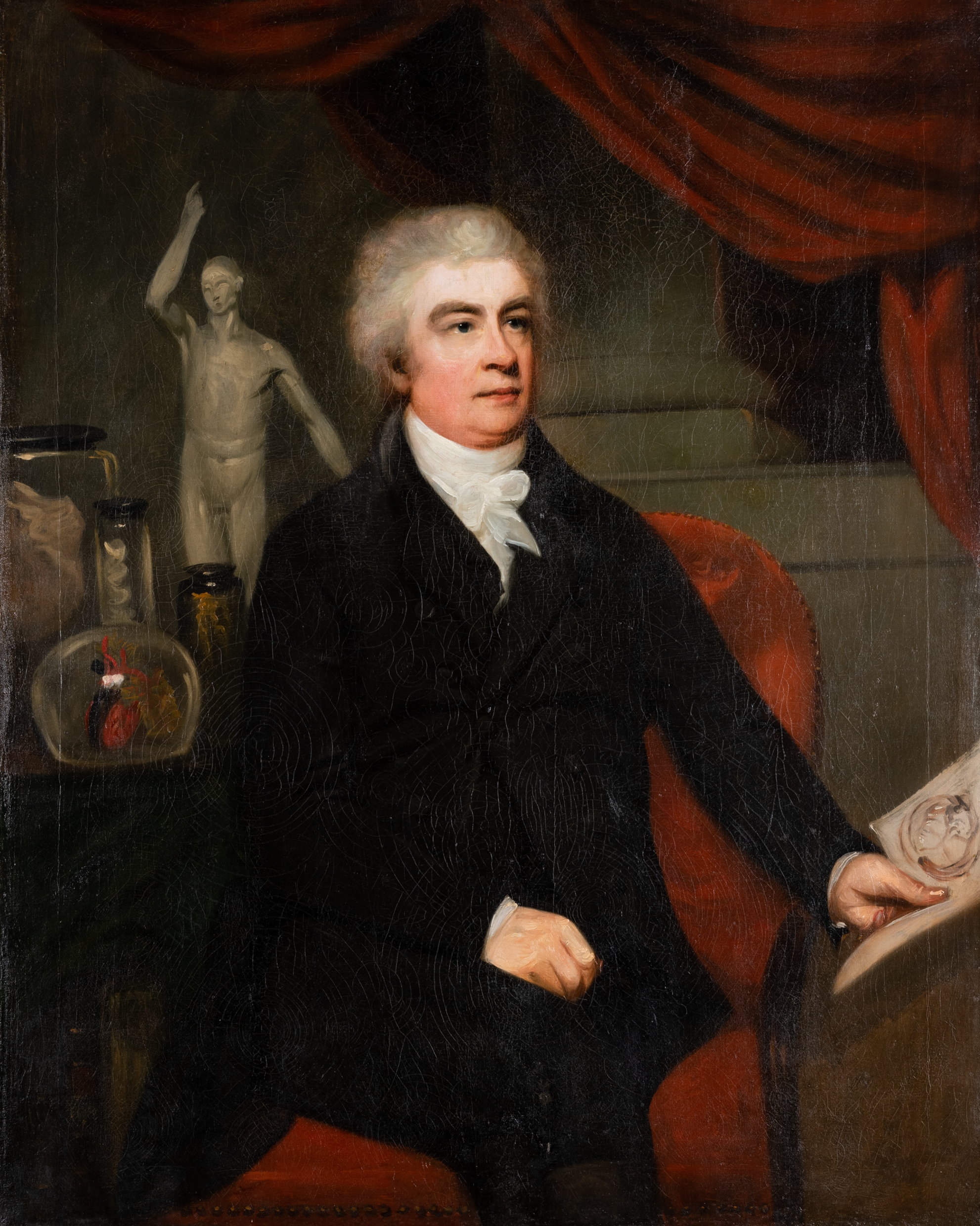
John Sheldon (1752-1808) was an anatomist and surgeon.

== Career ==
Sheldon was born in London on 6 July 1752, and was apprenticed to Henry Watson, elected in 1766 the first professor of anatomy of the Surgeons' Company. Sheldon studied and taught anatomy at Watson's private museum in Tottenham Court Road, which was later wrecked by a mob. He received his diploma at the Surgeons' Company on 2 November 1775, and then lectured on anatomy at Great Windmill Street school under William Hunter.

Sheldon was surgeon to the General Medical Asylum in Welbeck Street, and on 18 July 1782 he was appointed professor of anatomy to the Royal Academy in succession to Hunter. He was elected a Fellow of the Royal Society on 29 April 1784, and on 20 April 1786 he became surgeon to Westminster Hospital, a post he resigned two years later.

== Teacher ==
In 1777 Sheldon opened a private theatre in Great Queen Street, where he taught anatomy, and pursued research. After the deaths of William Hewson and Magnus Falconar, he had emerged as the leading young teacher in his field. His pupils included Thomas Beddoes and Joshua Brookes. He hired Charles Brandon Trye as assistant in his private school.

When Sheldon moved away from London, his house in Great Queen Street was taken over with his teaching by James Wilson.

== Mental illness and last years ==
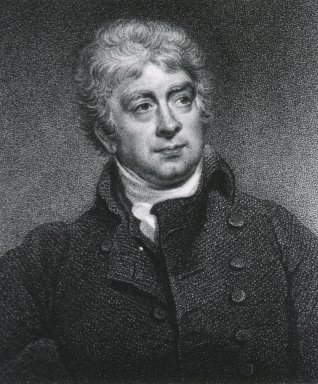
John Sheldon

Sheldon's mental health broke down in 1788. He believed that he had discovered an easy method of catching whales with poisoned harpoons, and he made a voyage to Greenland that year to test it. He was sent back on another ship, and from then on was subject to periods of bad mental health, now thought to be a bipolar disorder.

Sheldon moved to Exeter. There he was elected surgeon to the Devon and Exeter Hospital on 25 July 1797.

In Exeter Sheldon belonged to the Society of Gentlemen, founded in 1792 by Hugh Downman. Other members included Isaac D'Israeli, Richard Polwhele, and Bartholomew Parr. He contributed to its 1796 volume of essays.

Sheldon died at his cottage on the River Exe on 8 October 1808.

== Balloonist ==
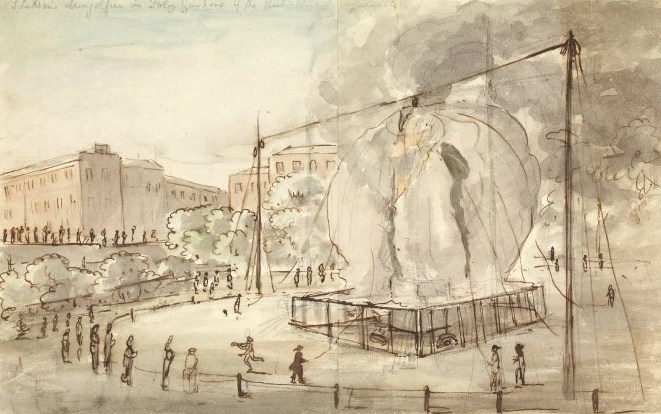
John Sheldon's hot air balloon burning, 25 September 1784, watercolour by Charles Francis Greville

It is sometimes said that Sheldon was the first Englishman to make an ascent in a balloon. Archibald Geikie in his biography of Barthélemy Faujas de Saint-Fond gives an account which may be garbled, and the Scot James Tytler has priority for British ascents, from August 1784. Sheldon made a first attempt himself, on 16 August: a tethered balloon caught fire.

Vincent Lunardi made the first ascent in England, on 15 September 1784; and on 25 September Sheldon again tried with his own Montgolfier balloon from Foley House, Portland Place, London. The balloon caught fire, and Sheldon with his companion Keegan were unable to get off the ground. This attempted ascent was then the subject of a caricature by Paul Sandby.

Jean-Pierre Blanchard came to England in the autumn of that year, looking for financial backing for ballooning. Sheldon's flight with him took place on 16 October. It carried scientific instruments, but failed to ascend: Blanchard threw instruments overboard. They landed at Sunbury-on-Thames, and quarrelled, with Blanchard carrying on the flight alone. With John Jeffries, Sheldon then tried to have the Royal Society support more balloon ascents, but without success.

== Works ==
Sheldon spent time in studying the lymphatic system, an area on which William Cumberland Cruikshank also was working. He devoted attention to embalming, too. Both interests came from William Hunter's inspiration, and were lifelong.

Sheldon had a celebrated body of a young woman embalmed: there are differing accounts. It was that of a patient who had died of phthisis in the Lock Hospital, and he embalmed it himself; it was his mistress, he had William Hunter embalm it, and he kept it in his bedroom until his wife complained. The body was presented by his widow Rebecca (died 1820) to the Royal College of Surgeons.

Sheldon's works were:

- The History of the Absorbent System, London, 1784; only the first part was issued, dedicated to Sir Joseph Banks.
- An Essay on the Fracture of the Patella or Kneepan ... with Observations on the Fracture of the Olecranon, London, 1789; new edition London, 1819.

Sheldon also edited Johann Nathanael Lieberkühn's Quatuor Dissertationes, London, 1782.

== Notes ==
Attribution

This article incorporates text from a publication now in the public domain: Lee, Sidney, ed. (1897). "Sheldon, John". Dictionary of National Biography. Vol. 52. London: Smith, Elder & Co.
