= William Higton =

English painter

William Nichols Higton (1796–1867) was an English clergyman, and philanthropist who is best known for his work for the Booth Charities. He was also a Fellow of the Royal Manchester Institute, Founding Member of the Art Union of London, and Member of the British Archaeological Association. The family's association with Manchester derived from the Cotton Industry, with a Cotton Mill and Counting House (John Higton & Co) on Ancoats Lane.

== Background and education ==
Higton was baptised in London, the second son of the artist John Higton and Mary Sheldon. He was named after his father's friend John Nichols, who was his godfather. He went up to Cambridge at an early age and entered St John's College, being ordained as a Deacon in 1814 and a Priest in 1815, having been admitted to the BA on the 21 January 1815.

He gained his place at St John's College via a sizarship (a form of scholarship) granted by benefactors of the college. In this case, William Robson, of Finchley, had donated money to the College in 1637 to benefit two poor students (sizars) yearly on behalf of the Company of Salters, with sons of Brothers to have preferential treatment. A further two sizarships were similarly available at Oxford. Such scholars were known as Robson's Exhibitioners.

Higton was therefore exempt from paying college fees and charges but was only admitted into Halls in preparation for his exams. Towards the end of his studies, he became a "re-admitted pensioner," which means he became a fully paid member of the college, presumably having obtained a patron, who could pay for his studies and accommodation in Halls. Rev Thomas Waldron Hornbuckle was his tutor during his BA. He gained his M.A. degree on the 10 July 1818, not having been able to complete it earlier under the statutes of the university which was then in force.

== Religious life and marriage ==
He obtained a perpetual curacy of £50.00 a year at Croxden, Staffordshire, on 1 May 1818, his Patron was George Parker, 4th Earl of Macclesfield, a cousin of his father's friend and Patron Henry Venables-Vernon, 3rd Baron Vernon. This was followed by the stipendiary curacy of Bradley le Moors, Staffordshire, on 16 June 1819, which was then worth an additional £30.00 a year. Higton was nominated for the curacy by the Rev. William Eddowes on his death, who was an incumbent of the Parker family, of Park Hall.

On 18 March 1823 Higton also succeeded to the stipendiary curacy of Checkley, John Barton Phillips, of Heath House, matching the Stipend of Croxden. Here Higton was responsible for the construction of Christ Church, Upper Tean, completed in 1841, and establishing the Lancasterian School (now called Great Wood Primary School, Upper-Tean) in 1855. He was presented with a Silver Salver, and other plate, by Thomas Hutchinson in 1839 as a testimony to his private worth, and faithful ministry.

He married Ellen Spendelow Townsend, the daughter of the late William Townsend, esq. of Liverpool, at St Philip's Church in Liverpool on 28 September 1843. By this time he was living at Huntley House, near Cheadle. They had one daughter.

== Philanthropy and interests ==
From 1823 until his death in 1867 Higton worked closely with the Booth Charities, established in the first quarter of the seventeenth century by Humphrey Booth (the Elder), to aid the relief of the poor of Salford and Manchester. With the support of his wife he also established charities in Tean and Croxden which still provide support for inhabitants of those towns to this day.

He was a keen Water Colour Artist, exhibiting at the Royal Manchester Institution on a number of occasions, and was a Founding Member of the Art Union of London. He was also a member of the British Archaeological Association.
