= Devil's Chimney (Gloucestershire) =

Rock formation on Leckhampton Hill, south of Cheltenham, Gloucestershire, England

Coordinates: 51°51′51.2″N 2°4′44.9″W

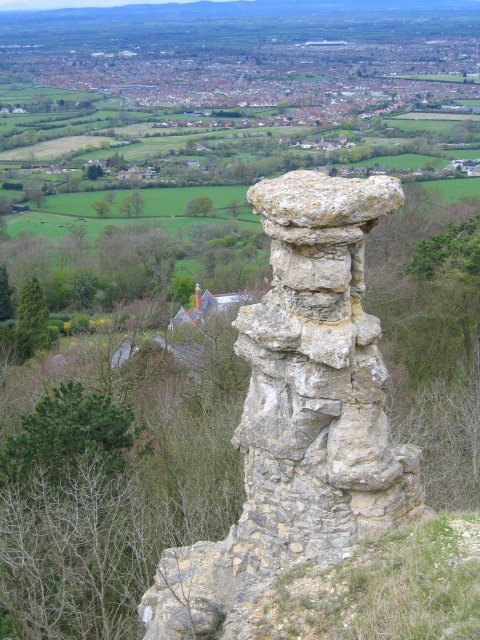
The Devil's Chimney from above, looking towards Cheltenham

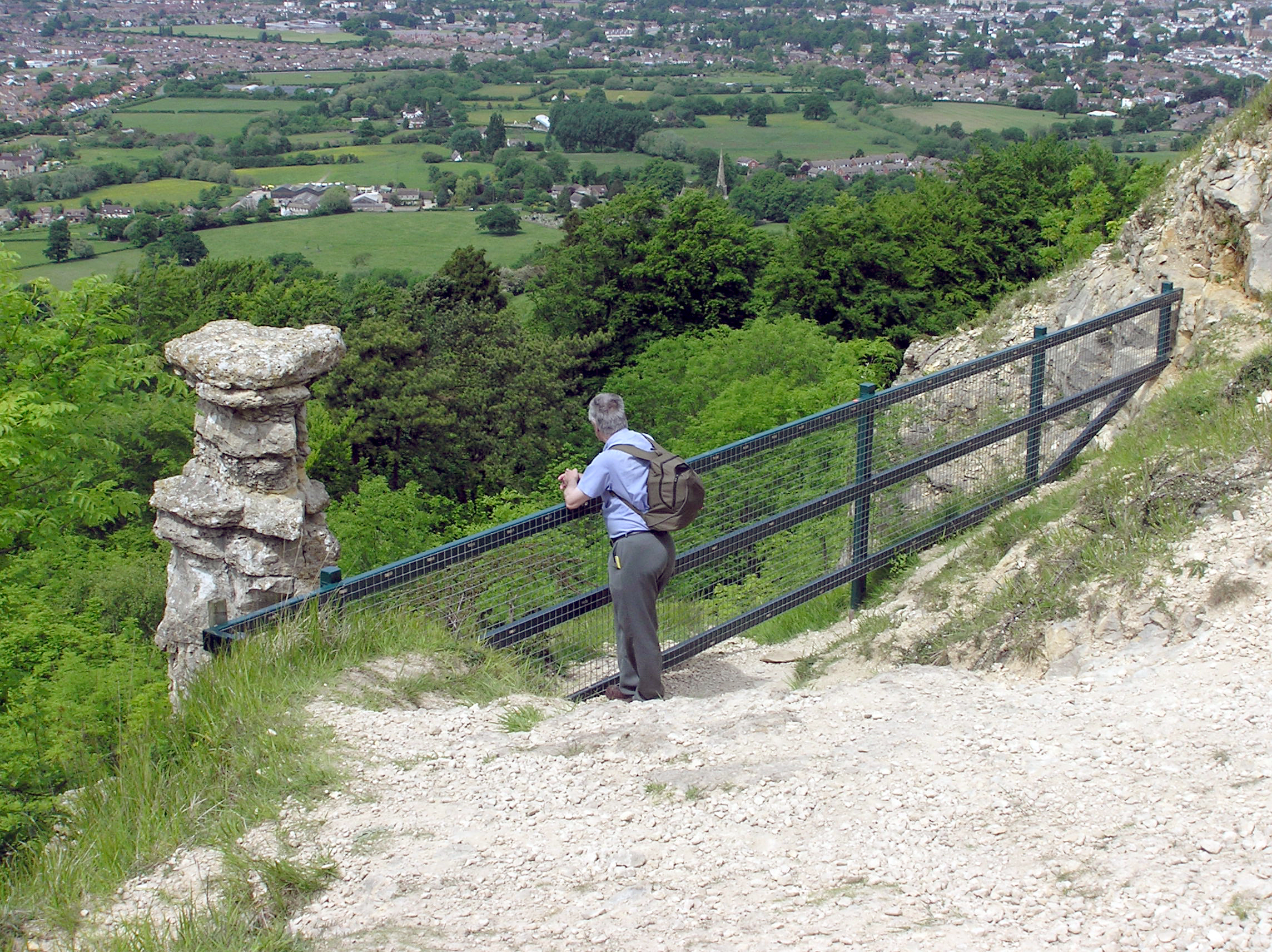
The Devils Chimney viewpoint

The Devil's Chimney is a rock formation on Leckhampton Hill, south of Cheltenham, Gloucestershire, England.

It is a largely man-made pillar outcrop, formed when an incline to a quarry was cut behind it, isolating the pillar from the main hillside. It is named for its peculiar shape, that of a crooked and twisted chimney rising from the ground. The Devil's Chimney is a local landmark, but its origins are uncertain. In 1926 it survived an earthquake, but not without a few cracks. In 1985 it was repaired and protected from further erosion.

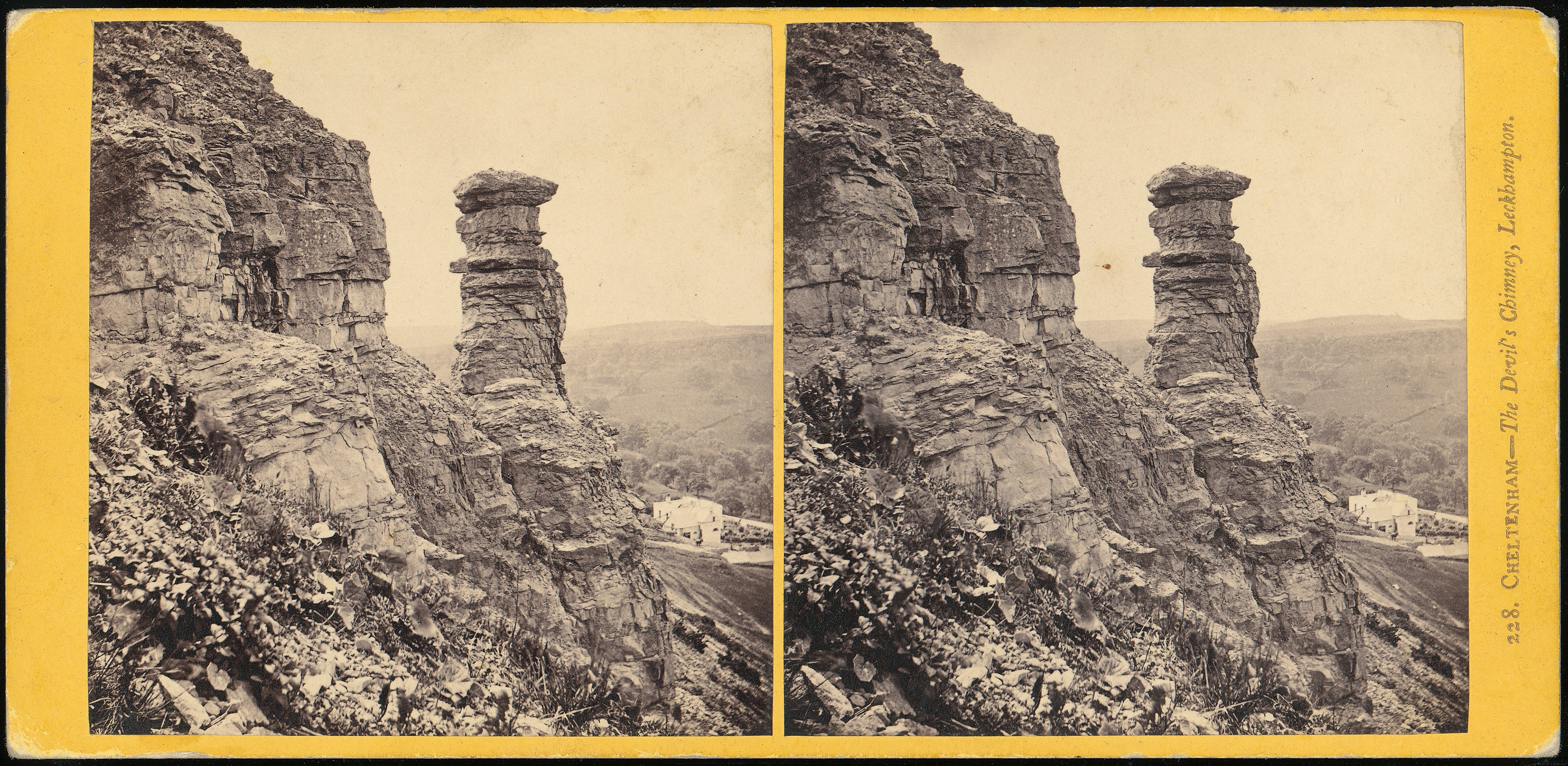
Early stereograph, circa 1860s

== Location ==
The Devil's Chimney is on the western edge of the Leckhampton Hill Local Nature Reserve, which is part of the Cotswolds Area of Outstanding Natural Beauty. Leckhampton Hill has a history of extensive stone quarrying.

== Local legend ==
The outcrop was well-known as a local landmark by the time that Cheltenham was established as a popular tourist destination, although its true origin appears to have been forgotten already. Ruff's History of Cheltenham (1803) describes it as, its grotesque chimney, built by preternatural hands and Built by the devil, as say the vulgar. It was no doubt built by shepherds in the frolic of an idle hour.

Legend holds that the Devil's Chimney is the chimney of the Devil's dwelling deep beneath the ground. Supposedly the Devil, provoked by the many Christian churches of the area, would sit atop Leckhampton Hill and hurl stones at Sunday churchgoers. However the stones were turned back on him, driving him beneath the ground and trapping him there so he could not further harass the villagers. Now he uses the mass of stones as his chimney to let free the smokes of hell.

Visitors to the Devil's Chimney would leave a coin on the rock as payment to the Devil in exchange for his staying in his underground home and not leaving to create mischief and spread evil in the local area.

== Creation ==
The 19th-century geologist S. Buckman suggested that the strange shape of the Devil's Chimney could be put down to differential erosion, involving a softer outer rock being worn away to leave only the inner harder rock remaining. However there is no evidence for such a column of harder rock, nor an explanation for how it would form.

Local authors have concluded that the Devil's Chimney was probably left behind by 18th-century quarry workers, who quarried around it as a joke. That cannot be ruled out, but the Chimney shares both the structure and the appearance of a naturally-occurring hoodoo structure, where a cap of harder material protects a softer pillar.

== Conservation ==
The outcrop is prone to erosion and by the 1960s had clearly visible signs of a likely collapse within 25–50 years. This was most noticeable on the exposed western side away from the hill, where a large vertical fissue was obvious.

Repair work was performed in the 1980s. This is most obvious in the lower section, which now resembles a man-made wall.
