= Leckhampton =

Village in Gloucestershire, England

Coordinates: 51°52′50″N 2°6′0″W

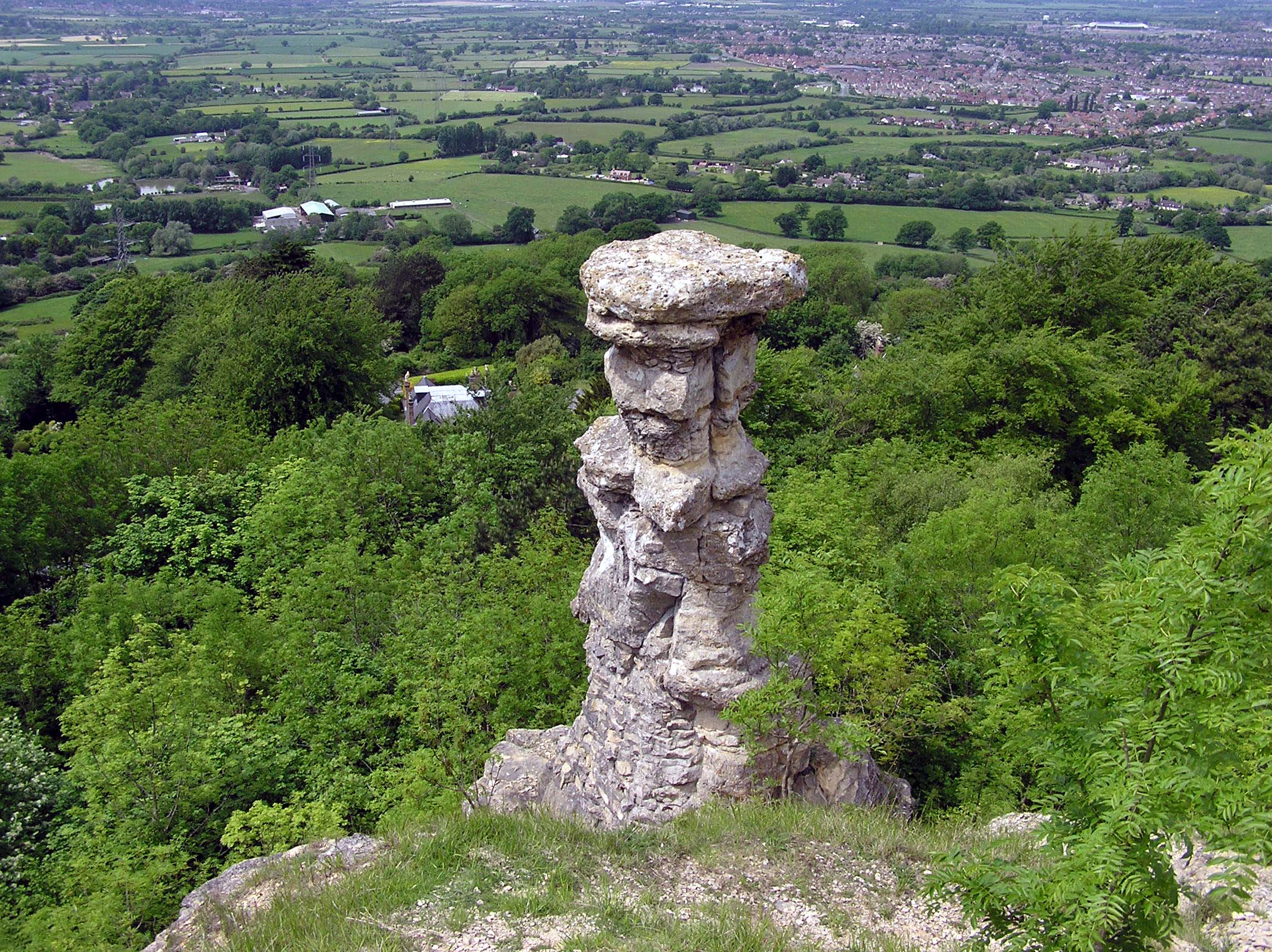
- The Devil's Chimney on Leckhampton Hill

- Location within Gloucestershire
- Civil parish: Leckhampton with Warden Hill
- District: Cheltenham
- Shire county: Gloucestershire
- Region: South West
- Country: England
- Sovereign state: United Kingdom

Leckhampton is a village and a district in south Cheltenham, Gloucestershire, England. The area is in the civil parish of Leckhampton with Warden Hill and is part of the district of Cheltenham. The population of the civil parish taken at the 2011 census was 4,409.

== History ==
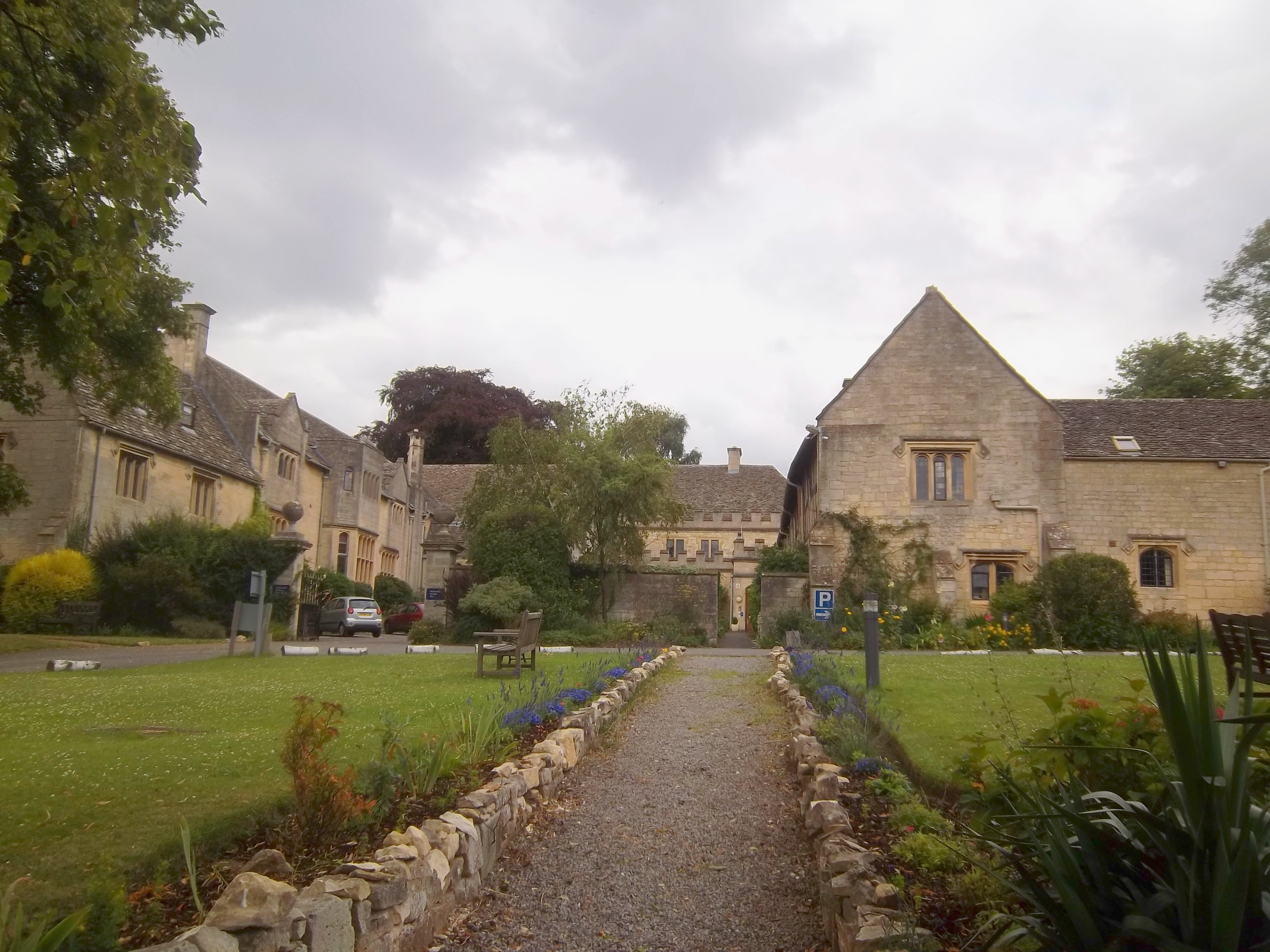
Leckhampton Court

Leckhampton is mentioned in the Domesday Book (1086) as 'Lechametone' and 'Lechantone', meaning 'homestead where garlic or leeks are grown'. The earliest recorded mention comes from the 8th century, as the home farm of the royal manor of Cheltenham.

There are remnants of a moat at Church Farm that dates from Saxon times (grid reference SO941195})

The old village of Leckhampton stands at the foot of Leckhampton Hill, around the medieval parish church of St Peter's. During the 19th and 20th centuries, there was residential development in the direction of Cheltenham.

Leckhampton Court is a medieval manor house dating from about 1320, built by the Giffard family of Brimpsfield. It is now a Sue Ryder Care hospice.

Between 1881 and 1962, Leckhampton had its own railway station with services on both the Great Western Railway line between Cheltenham and Banbury and on the north–south Midland and South Western Junction Railway. Until 1930, Leckhampton was served by the tramcars of the Cheltenham and District Light Railway.

On the hill still stands the ruins of the old quarry. You can still see the remains of the old lime kilns, and there are old railway tracks all over the hill. Leckhampton Hill, together with Charlton Kings Common, is designated an SSSI by Natural England.

The oldest railway (or tramway) in Gloucestershire ran from the quarries to Daisybank road, then alongside Leckhampton road, through Tivoli and beside Queens Road and Gloucester Road, terminating opposite the site of the Cheltenham gasworks (now Tesco). This was later superseded by a more substantial line joining the railway at Charlton Kings station, the lower route of which can be seen as a ridge across the golf course in the vicinity of Sandy Lane.

=== The Leckhampton Riots ===
In 1894, Henry J. Dale of the Leckhampton Quarry Company Limited bought 26 acres (11 ha) of land on Leckhampton hill. To the outrage of local people, he fenced off the area, closing footpaths and warning that anyone found on the land would be treated as trespassers. He also built Tramway Cottage on Daisybank Road, a site that had been used to host a travelling funfair every Good Friday.

In March 1902, about 10,000 protesters tore down the fences and converged on Daisybank Road where they destroyed the cottage. The ringleaders were arrested and sent to Gloucester Prison. Henry Dale rebuilt Tramway Cottage but in 1906 another large group of protesters demolished Dale's fences and gathered at Daisybank Road with the intention of demolishing it again. This time, they were met by the town magistrate (George Backhouse Witts) and a number of policemen. The magistrate read the Riot Act and, once more, the ringleaders were sent to prison.

There is a plaque near the Devil's Chimney to one of the rioters, George A Price.

The protesters' leaders had met at the Malvern Inn (now a private house in Leckhampton Rd opposite the end of Church Rd), a fact commemorated by a plaque on the wall of the house. The Inn ceased trading in the 1990s. It had a sign portraying a view of the Malverns with the Devil's Chimney in the foreground.

In 1929, Cheltenham Town Council bought the land on the hillside, making it available once more for public access.

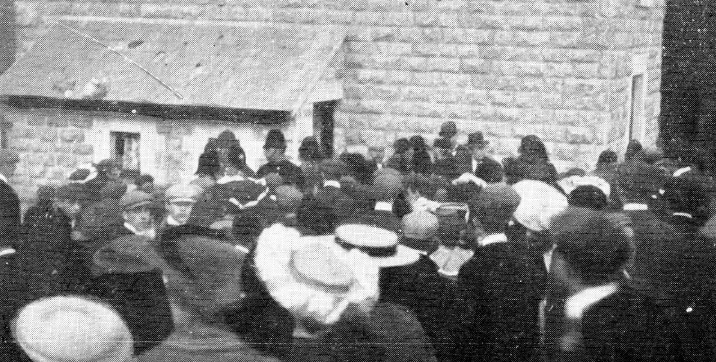
Reading the Riot Act at Leckhampton Hill, 1906

Memorial plaque to George A Price

Commemorative plaque to the meeting place of the rioters

== The Leckhampton community ==
Leckhampton Village Hall, formerly the Parish Hall of St Peter's Church, is a Grade II listed building in Church Road. It provides a base for community activities, amateur dramatics (Leckhampton Players) and dance classes (Leckhampton Tappers). Following a major fundraising effort, the roof was replaced in 2009 at a cost of some £90,000.

The village has a playing field (known as Burrows Field) for cricket, rugby, and football matches, with a play area and nursery nearby. Local football club Leckhampton Rovers play their home matches at the village playing field.

The main shopping area for Leckhampton residents is the Bath Road, a mile or so north of the old village centre.

The Wheatsheaf Pub was a favourite drinking spot of Brian Jones.

The Old Patesians R.F.C. is based at the foot of the hill.

The Sue Ryder organisation has a home in Leckhampton which was once used as a prisoner of war camp.

The Leckhampton sub-Post Office (on the corner of Church Rd and Leckhampton Rd) was closed around 2000 and reverted to a general store, which itself closed in 2018. The premises were converted for residential use. The nearest offices are in Bath Rd (about 2 km) and Charlton Kings (about 3 km).

A newsagents shop on Old Bath Road was well known to be regularly used by the Queen Mother (or her Chauffeur) en route to Cheltenham Races, and was normally decorated with bunting in expectation of a visit.

=== Churches ===
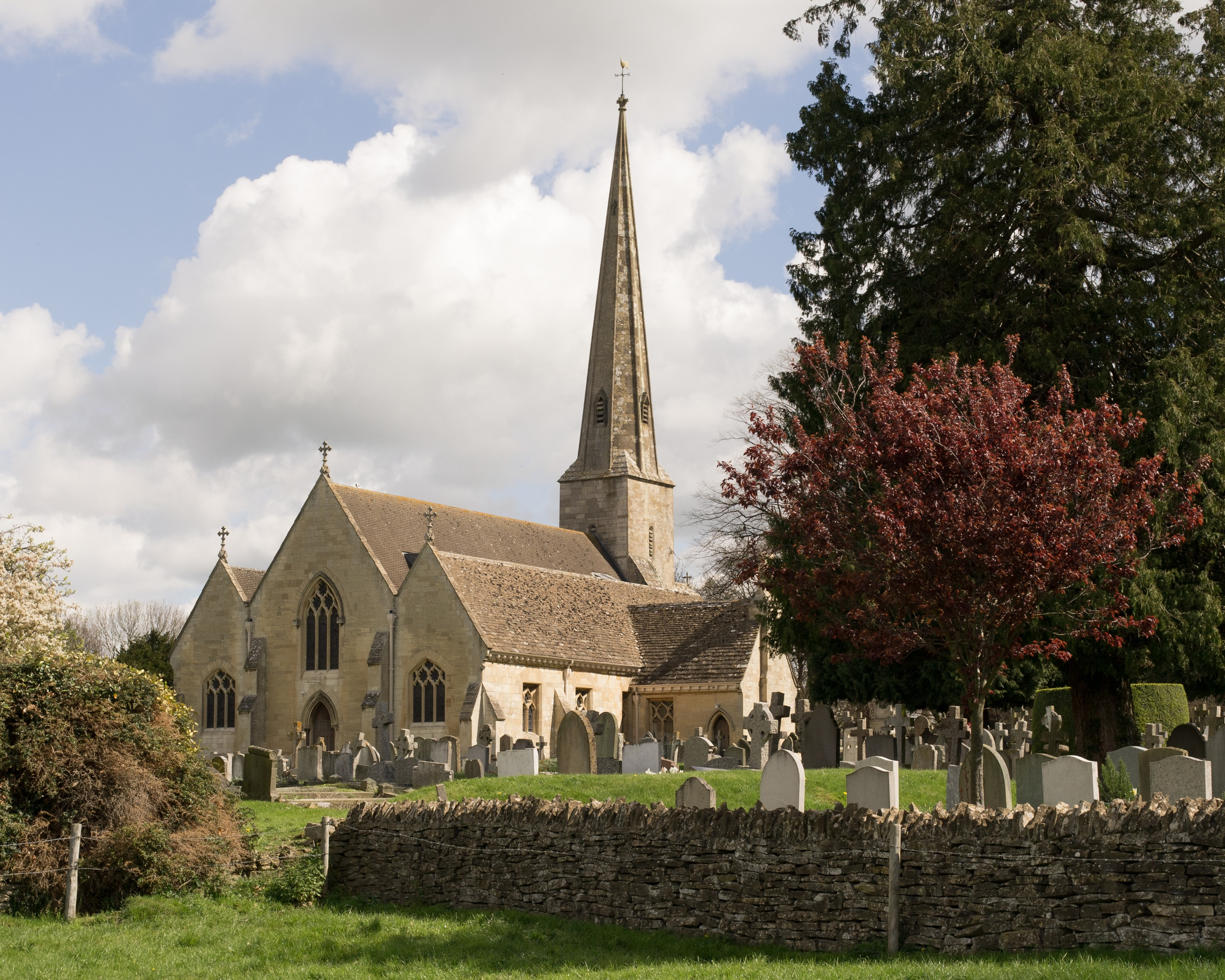
St Peter's Church, Leckhampton

The oldest church in Leckhampton is St Peter's.

The expansion of Leckhampton towards Cheltenham resulted in the building of two more churches, the Victorian Gothic St Philip and St James and the mid-20th-century Emmanuel Church (founded in the late 19th century as a mission from St Luke's Church). St Peter's, St Philip & St James and Emmanuel are linked with St Christopher's (Warden Hill) and St Stephen's (Tivoli) in the Anglican South Cheltenham Team – formally established in 2010. Leckhampton is also served by Bethesda Methodist Church, Leckhampton Baptist Church, Naunton Lane Chapel (Evangelical Presbyterian Church from 2010) and Providence Chapel.

=== Schools ===
The local primary schools are Leckhampton Church of England School and Naunton Park School. The High School, a new secondary school, built at the junction of Kidnappers Lane and Farm Lane, was opened in September 2021 and will eventually cater for pupils aged 11–16.

=== Leckhampton Cricket Club ===
Leckhampton Cricket Club was established in 2006.

=== Hospitals ===
The Delancey Rehabilitation and Assessment Hospital (originally a fever hospital, named after its benefactor) was located on Charlton Lane. It closed in 2009, with the site built on in 2012. The original main building has been retained with internal alterations. The building and grounds were redeveloped into housing, completed in 2013. The Charlton Lane Centre (dealing with Mental Health including dementia) is nearby, as well as a Leonard Cheshire home. Leckhampton Court, adjacent to St Peter's Church, is a Sue Ryder hospice.

=== Scouting ===
Scouting has been active in Leckhampton since 1907. It is based in the Leckhampton Scout Hut, on Leckhampton Road. Beavers, Cubs, Scouts, and Explorers all meet there and it is an occasional meeting place of Network. The Group actively organises its own camps and weekly meetings, as well as attending County level camps.

== Geography ==
Near the top of Leckhampton Hill stands a noted limestone rock formation known as the Devil's Chimney. It is believed that the chimney was created by limestone quarrymen. Although it has become a symbol of Leckhampton, the Devil's Chimney actually sits within neighbouring parish of Shurdington.

In the south of Leckhampton lies the small residential area of Pilley. The former railway line at Pilley Bridge is now a Cheltenham Borough Council nature reserve.

Kidnappers Lane meanders its way from Church Road towards Shurdington Road. The name is old enough for its reason to be undocumented.
