= Cheltenham Science Festival =

UK science festival

Coordinates: 51.890°N 2.078°W

Cheltenham Science Festival is one of the UK's leading science festivals, and is part of Cheltenham Festivals: also responsible for the Jazz, Music and Literature Festivals that run every year.

The 2018 Cheltenham Science Festival (6–11 June) was held in Imperial Square, Cheltenham.

== Introduction and history ==
The youngest of the Cheltenham Festivals, the Cheltenham Science Festival was first held in 2002, and has quickly grown to become one of the most significant of its kind in the UK.

== Guests and directors ==
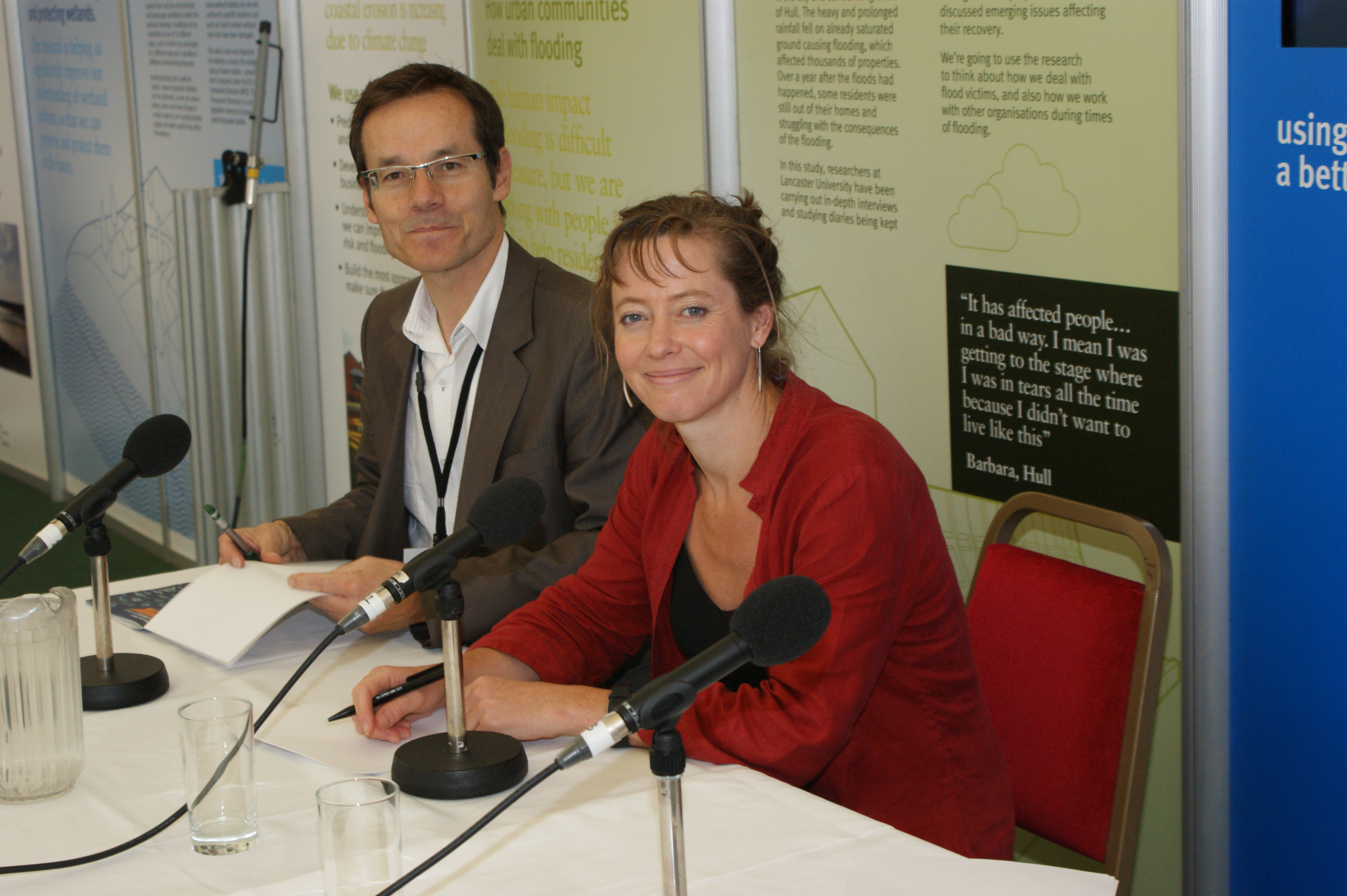
Co-directors Kathy Sykes and Mark Lythgoe at the 2009 Cheltenham Science Festival

The guest directors for Cheltenham Science Festival 2017 are television presenter and actor Dallas Campbell and former NASA Chief Scientist Ellen Stofan. The Festival has attracted many significant names in Science over the years, including Robert Winston (the first 'guest director' in 2004), David Puttnam (Director 2005), Jonathon Porritt (Director 2007), Adam Hart-Davis, Susan Greenfield, Richard Dawkins, Lucy Hawking, A. C. Grayling, Tony Robinson and Richard Hammond. In 2014 the guest directors were BAFTA winning naturalist Steve Backshall and radio and TV presenter Richard Bacon.

== Programme ==
The Cheltenham Science Festival aims to engage in entertaining, challenging and deliberately discussing controversial issues and experiences. The 2017 programme contained over 140 events across six-days, including a number of dedicated family events.

=== Discover Zone ===
A main feature of the festival is the Discover Zone. Billed as 'Interactive Science for all ages', it is a free interactive exhibition space that takes up the main space of Cheltenham's Town Hall.

=== FameLab ===
FameLab was set up in 2005 by Cheltenham Science Festival in partnership with NESTA. In Famelab, contestants give short (maximum three minute) presentations unaided by slides on an area of science, technology, engineering or mathematics (STEM) that they have been researching. They aim to give their presentation in a way that engages the general public, not simply scientists etc. who already have technical or specific knowledge on the area. This point is taken into account by the judging panel, usually science communicators themselves, who assess the communicators on clarity, content and communication before deciding whom to put through to the next round of competition. Famelab has regional heats in its participating countries, followed by national finals and then the international finals taking place every year at Cheltenham Science Festival.

In 2007, the competition was adopted by the British Council as one of its flagship science engagement projects, first as a South East Europe pilot. By 2010, Famelab expanded to include 14 nations across Europe, Asia and Africa, setting the stage for a growing global phenomenon. In 2015 the competition operated in 30 locations including the USA via NASA, 29 of which participated in international finals in June 2015. The International Grand Final at the Cheltenham Science Festival in June 2015 was streamed on the internet throughout the world.

At Cheltenham Science Festival the International Finals of Famelab consist of three international semi-finals where judges listen to the three-minute presentations from the international finalists, then ask them questions about the topic of the contestant's talk before deliberating on which scientists to select for the international final, held at the end of the festival in the 800-seater Arena. Former Material World radio presenter Quentin Cooper was compere during the final.

Over 4,000 young science communicators ("Famelabbers") have participated in Famelab competitions in their home countries, about 100 of which also represented their home countries at the Cheltenham Science Festival in the UK. It is fairly common in Famelab competitions that a Famelabber may not originate in the country they represent at the international finals, such as Bechara Saab (originally from Canada), who was the first to represent Switzerland at the International Grand Final, and Didac Carmona (originally from Spain), who represented Austria and won the International Grand Final in 2012. Famelab International 2014 was won by Pádraic Flood, originally from Ireland, representing the tripartite Benelux.

Also at the International Final two joint runners-up are announced as decided by the final judges, an audience winner voted for by the live audience in the arena via keypad is crowned and finally an alumni award is given to the winner of a worldwide online vote by juries in all the participating Famelab nations.

== Festival history ==
=== 2014 ===
==== Guest Directors ====
- Steve Backshall
- Richard Bacon

==== New features / expansion ====
The creation of The Times Science Hub, which incorporated a cafe, the Festival Box Office, bookshop and Talking Point became a focal point for activity, where people could spend time when not in events.

=== 2013 ===
==== Festival directors ====
- Kathy Sykes
- Mark Lythgoe

==== Guest directors ====
- Dame Wendy Hall
- David Willetts
- Dara Ó Briain

==== New features / expansion ====
For 2013, the introduction of the MRC Helix Theatre and return of the GE Pavilion for its second year marked even further growth in the development of the festival.

=== 2012 ===
==== Festival directors ====
- Kathy Sykes
- Mark Lythgoe

==== Guest directors ====
- Maggie Aderin-Pocock
- Marcus Brigstocke

==== Themes ====
Celebrating the 11th Cheltenham Science Festival, the theme is 'RE:Generation', "With a whole host of linked events from nerve regeneration to business regeneration through science." There have also been invited comedians like Robin Ince.

==== New features / expansion ====
This year marks an expansion of its adult focussed AREA 42 interactive zone and new collaborations

=== 2010 ===
==== Festival directors ====
- Kathy Sykes
- Mark Lythgoe

==== Guest director ====
- Brian Cox

=== 2009 ===
==== Festival directors ====
- Kathy Sykes
- Mark Lythgoe

==== Guest director ====
- Carol Vorderman

==== Themes ====
Including:

- Darwin - 2009 being 'Darwin Year', 200 years since his birth
- Galileo - celebrating the International Year of Astronomy
- Climate change

One of the Festival Partners is Chosen Hill School, the first secondary school to ever sponsor the festival.

=== 2008 ===
==== Festival directors ====
- Kathy Sykes
- Mark Lythgoe

==== Guest director ====
- Nick Ross - Journalist, broadcaster and presenter of BBC Crimewatch

==== Themes ====
Some of the major topics for 2008:

- 'Taboo'
- Mental capital and wellbeing
- The sustainable world

==== New features / expansion ====
A larger main area, two days of free outdoor activities, and more external events around Cheltenham. Also new - the 'Talking Point' - a place to continue debates and discussions inspired in events. The year 2008 saw the creation of SciFest, the International Science Festival, held in St Louis USA. This Science Festival was set up as a collaboration between Cheltenham Festivals and the St. Louis Science Center, in St Louis, Missouri, USA; and is run in a similar way to the UK festival on which it is based.

=== 2007 ===
==== Festival directors ====
- Kathy Sykes
- Mark Lythgoe

==== Guest director ====
- Jonathon Porritt - Chair of the UK's Sustainable Development Commission

==== Themes ====
Some of the major topics for 2007:

- Climate Change
- 'Perfect Humans'

=== 2006 ===
==== Festival directors ====
- Frank Burnet
- Kathy Sykes

==== Guest Director ====
No named Guest Director.

==== Theme ====
- Relationships - Including between humans and the planet and humans and urban spaces.

==== New features / expansion ====
The ExperiTent was introduced this year which was used for hands-on workshops aimed at schools and families.

=== 2005 ===
==== Festival directors ====
- Frank Burnet
- Kathy Sykes

==== Guest director ====
- David Puttnam - Film producer

==== Theme ====
- Other Worlds - Including developing countries, extreme environments and altered states.

=== 2004 ===
==== Festival directors ====
- Frank Burnet
- Kathy Sykes

==== Guest director ====
- Robert Winston

==== Theme ====
- Perception

==== New features / expansion ====
This year saw the introduction of a Guest Director who programmes events related to their area of interest and expertise. The first two years saw events taking place in the Cheltenham Town Hall and the Everyman theatre. This year, the Everyman was not used and instead The Arena, a large marquee built on gardens outside the Town Hall, was introduced which was used as the venue for the more popular events.

=== 2003 ===
==== Festival directors ====
- Frank Burnet
- Kathy Sykes

==== Theme ====
- Time and Space - Including exploring the cosmos, the science of ageing and the past and future of our planet.

=== 2002 ===
==== Festival directors ====
- Frank Burnet
- Kathy Sykes

== Cheltenham festivals ==
The Cheltenham Science Festival is one of the four festivals that Cheltenham Festivals run each year. Combined with the Jazz, Music and Literature Festivals, Cheltenham Festivals host over 700 events across 12 months.
