= Lake District Summer Music =

Music festival in the English Lake District

Lake District Summer Music (LDSM) is a music festival in the English Lake District. An annual event held in August, it features performances by international artists and there is also an academy for young musicians.

Founded in 1985, LDSM was listed as one of the "Ten Truly Festive Festivals" in the world by the Daily Telegraph in 2010. The festival concerts - principally focussed on chamber music - make use of a variety of venues, including St Mary's Church, Ambleside, and Blackwell.

== History ==
Renna Kellaway (1934-2024), a South African-born pianist and teacher, founded the festival. Kellaway received an MBE in the 2009 New Year's Honours for services to music and was married to Sir John Manduell, former Director of the Cheltenham Music Festival and founding Principal of the Royal Northern College of Music. The Chilingirian Quartet were resident artists from inception.

The Festival used to combine with a summer school: a programme for emerging professional musicians and another for younger string players, but these have now been replaced by Young Artist masterclasses. Alumni of the International Summer Music Academy have included Nicola Benedetti, Nikolaj Znaider, Jennifer Pike, Steven Osborne, James Rhodes, the Sacconi and Belcea quartets, as well as The Pether Trio.

The organisation was a Regularly Funded Organisation of Arts Council England until 2012 and has been supported by South Lakeland District Council.

During 2001-2008, LDSM extended its work beyond the summer in a series of developments devised by chief officer Andrew Lucas. A 4x4 Composer Residency, held in the spring or early summer, gave four emerging professional composers opportunity to compose works for an established ensemble, led by a leading British composer. Lead composers of previous projects are Nicola LeFanu, Martin Butler, John Casken and Robert Saxton. 4x4 Alumni have included John Habron, Benjamin Wallfisch, Paul Mealor, David Bruce and Phillip Cooke.

An Autumn Music from a Foreign Land project introduced the music and musicians of different continents through creative workshops and performances.

A programme of Street Concerts, SplashClassics, saw a concert take place at five stations along the train line from Manchester Airport (where many of the academy students arrived into the UK) through to Windermere (the nearest station to the academy base near Ambleside). The SplashClassics series was developed into a separate venture by its founder, Andrew Lucas, in 2013 and saw it reach new audiences through innovative series of events combining classical music, animation, poetry and dance.
