= Cheltenham Jazz Festival =

UK jazz festival

Coordinates: 51.890°N 2.078°W

Cheltenham Jazz Festival is a jazz festival in Cheltenham in the United Kingdom. It is part of Cheltenham Festivals' annual festival season, also including the Cheltenham Science Festival, Cheltenham Music Festival and Cheltenham Literature Festival Festivals in Cheltenham Spa.

== History ==
The Cheltenham Jazz Festival was started in 1996. With a programme developed by Tony Dudley-Evans, it includes a range of jazz types.

== Cheltenham festivals ==
Cheltenham Jazz Festival is one of the four festivals that Cheltenham Festivals run each year. Combined with the Science, Music and Literature Festivals, Cheltenham Festivals host over 800 events across 12 months.

== Sponsorship ==
After being previous partners with the Festival (as the 'official drink' in 2007, hosting the 'Budvar Jazz Marquee' and hosting the competition 'Budvar Brewed Jazz' in 2008), in 2009 the Czech beer company Budějovický Budvar became the title sponsors of Cheltenham's Jazz Festival, making the full name "Budvar Cheltenham Jazz Festival".

In 2010, Barclays became the Cheltenham Jazz Festival's title sponsor.

== Artists-in-residence ==
The festival has sometimes had an artist-in-residence, and these have included:

- 2004 John Taylor
- 2005 Bobby Previte
- 2006 Ken Vandermark
- 2007 Bob Brookmeyer
- 2012 Paloma Faith
- 2013 Gregory Porter
- 2014 Laura Mvula

== The Fringe ==
The festival includes a section, the Fringe, for less well-known bands and artists.

== Jerwood Jazz Generation ==
The Jerwood Jazz Generation series is the result of a partnership between the Cheltenham Jazz Festival and the Jerwood Foundation to support jazz musicians. Since 2002 the scheme has backed more than 50 young British artists who come to Cheltenham to premiere a commission, launch a new band or for a second outing of a new project. Musicians have included Bryan Corbett, Soweto Kinch, Ingrid Laubrock, Gwilym Simcock and Seb Rochford. Projects have included Denys Baptiste's Let Freedom Ring! and Abram Wilson's Ride! – Ferris Wheel to the Modern Day Delta.

== Venues ==
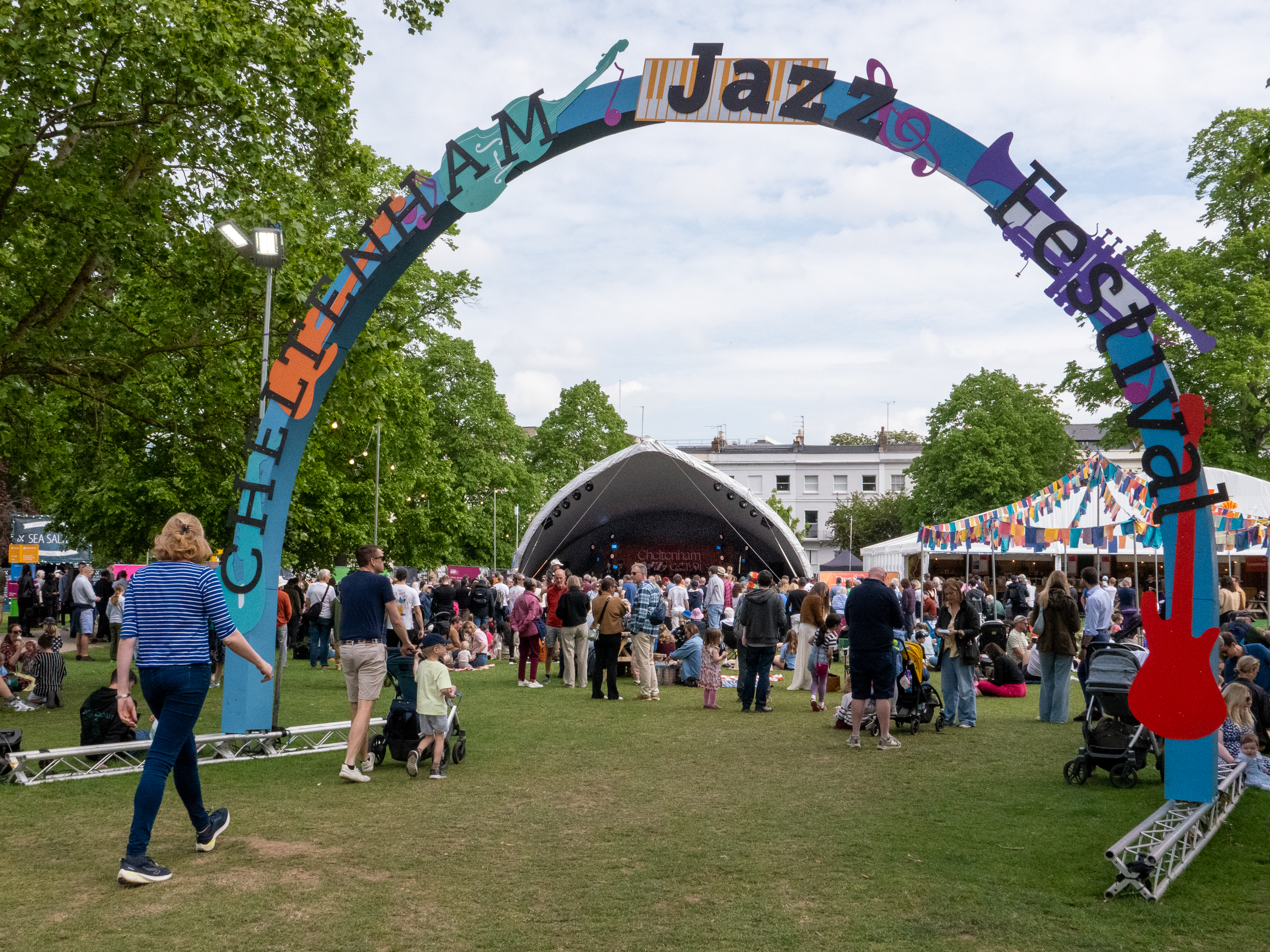
Cheltenham Jazz Festival held in Montpellier Gardens in May 2026

The events of Cheltenham Jazz Festival mainly take place in a tented village in Montpellier Gardens. Dinner concerts and some other performances take place in other venues around town, such as the Playhouse Theatre, the Daffodil Restaurant, the Parabola Arts Centre of Cheltenham Ladies' College and Cheltenham Town Hall.

== Festival history ==
=== Artists performing in 2015 ===
Caro Emerald, Sun Ra Arkestra, Rumer, Joe Lovano, Wilko Johnson, Martha Reeves & The Vandellas, John Scofield, Gregory Porter, Madeski Martin & Wood, Laura Mvula, Tony Allen, Average White Band, Gilles Peterson, GoGo Penguin, Bassekou Kouyate and Lee Konitz.

=== Artists performing in 2014 ===
Jools Holland, Jamie Cullum, Curtis Stigers, Robert Cray, Gregory Porter, Kurt Elling, Billy Cobham, Laura Mvula, Loose Tubes, Frank Sinatra Jnr., Nick Mulvey, Judith Owen, Tigran, Eska, Hailey Tuck, Gilles Peterson, Snarky Puppy, Natalie Williams and Julian Siegel.

=== Artists performing in 2013 ===
Van Morrison, Noisettes, Ravi Coltrane, the New Gary Burton Quartet, Gregory Porter, Madeleine Peyroux, Jamie Cullum, Georgie Fame, Claire Martin, Lianne La Havas, Laura Mvula and Dave Douglas.

=== Artists performing in 2012 ===
Paloma Faith, Jamie Cullum, Imelda May, Gregory Porter, The Puppini Sisters, Melody Gardot, Bill Frisell, Candi Staton and Marcus Miller.

=== Artists performing in 2010 ===
Jamie Cullum, Paloma Faith, Elaine Paige, Eric Bibb, Imelda May, Liane Carroll, Michael Parkinson and Kit Downes.

=== Artists performing in 2009 ===
Hugh Masekela, Nigel Kennedy, BBC Big Band, The Souljazz Orchestra, Beardyman, Portico Quartet, Jack DeJohnette, Madeleine Peyroux, Robert Mitchell, Alex Wilson, Pat Martino, Dave Douglas, Don Byron, John Surman, Nikki Yeoh, BBC Concert Orchestra, Dave Liebman, Imelda May, Lea Delaria, and the Scratch Perverts.

=== Artists performing in 2008 ===
Eartha Kitt, Cleo Laine, Maceo Parker, Carol Brewster, Dennis Rollins, John Dankworth, Ruby Turner, Imelda May, Courtney Pine, Bill Frisell, Jack DeJohnette, Van Morrison, Gilles Peterson, Jose James, the BBC Big Band, Roberto Fonseca, Nicola Conte, Tawiah, and Mr Scruff.
