= Genius of Britain =

2010 television documentary series

- Genre: Documentary
- Directed by: Tim Usborne
- Composer: Dru Masters
- Country of origin: United Kingdom
- Original language: English
- No. of series: 1
- No. of episodes: 5

Production
- Running time: 50 minutes
- Production company: IWC Media Ltd.

Original release
- Network: Channel 4
- Release: 30 May – 3 June 2010

Genius of Britain: The Scientists Who Changed the World is a five-part 2010 television documentary presented by leading British scientific figures, which charts the history of some of Britain's most important scientists and innovators.

== Presenters ==
=== Main Host ===
- Stephen Hawking – Theoretical Physicist, Cosmologist

=== Segment Presenters ===
- Jim Al-Khalili – Theoretical physicist
- David Attenborough – Broadcaster, Naturalist
- Richard Dawkins – Evolutionary biologist
- James Dyson – Industrial designer
- Olivia Judson – Evolutionary biologist
- Paul Nurse – Geneticist
- Kathy Sykes – Physicist
- Robert Winston – Medical doctor, Scientist

== Segments ==
Episode 1: The First Five
Subject: Christopher Wren	Presenter: David Attenborough
An English natural philosopher, anatomist and astronomer, as well as a pioneering architect, who as founding president of the Royal Society pioneered practical experimentation and secured the society's royal patronage.
Subject: Robert Hooke	Presenter: Richard Dawkins
An English natural philosopher, instrument maker, astronomer and pioneering microbiologist, who was curator of experiments for the Royal Society and the first to illustrate insects as seen through a microscope.
Subject: Robert Boyle	Presenter: James Dyson
An Anglo-Irish natural philosopher and pioneering chemist, who with the assistance Robert Hooke developed the air pump to discover the properties of air and its importance to life, which he demonstrated to the Royal Society.
Subject: Isaac Newton	Presenter: Jim Al-Khalili
An English natural philosopher, mathematician, astronomer and alchemist, whose contributions to optics, universal gravitation and laws of motion resulted in his knighthood and presidency of the Royal Society.
Subject: Edmond Halley	Presenter: Kathy Sykes
An English natural philosopher, astronomer and mathematician, whose mapping of the stars of the southern hemisphere resulted in his appointment to the Royal Society and as the second Astronomer Royal.

Episode 2: A Roomful of Brilliant Minds
Subject: Joseph Banks	Presenter: David Attenborough
A British naturalist and botanist who assembled a large collection of exotic biological specimens while sailing with James Cook on his first voyage and became a long-serving director of Kew Gardens and president of the Royal Society.
Subject: James Watt	Presenter: James Dyson
A Scottish inventor and mechanical engineer whose development the Watt steam engine, while repairing a Newcomen steam engine, drove the Industrial Revolution first in Britain and then in the rest of the world.
Subject: John Hunter	Presenter: Robert Winston
A Scottish surgeon and anatomist who collected specimens, preserved at the Hunterian Museum, and made accurate maps of the body and how the parts interact and function, which brought surgery out of the Middle Ages and put it on a scientific basis.
Subject: Edward Jenner	Presenter: Richard Dawkins
An English physician, scientist and pioneering immunologist, trained by John Hunter, who deliberately infected a boy first with cowpox and then with smallpox in a pioneering experiment which led to the development of the world's first vaccine.
Subject: Henry Cavendish	Presenter: Jim Al-Khalili
A British natural philosopher and chemist who discovered and investigated the properties of hydrogen, which he called inflammable air, paving the way for hydrogen balloons and bombs, and working with Joseph Priestley discovered the composition of water.
Subject: Joseph Priestley	Presenter: Jim Al-Khalili
An English natural philosopher, theologian and chemist who investigated the properties of air, inventing soda water and discovering oxygen in the process, and working with Henry Cavendish discovered the composition of water.

Episode 3: The Lights Come On
Subject: Michael Faraday	Presenter: James Dyson
A British scientist who contributed to the study of electromagnetism and electrochemistry. His main discoveries include the principles underlying electromagnetic induction, diamagnetism and electrolysis.
Subject: Alfred Russel Wallace	Presenter: Richard Dawkins
A British naturalist, explorer, geographer, anthropologist, and biologist. He is best known for independently conceiving the theory of evolution through natural selection; his paper on the subject was jointly published with some of Charles Darwin's writings in 1858.
Subject: William Thomson	Presenter: Kathy Sykes
A British a mathematical physicist and engineer who did important work in the mathematical analysis of electricity and formulation of the first and second laws of thermodynamics, and unifying the emerging discipline of physics in its modern form.
Subject: Isambard Kingdom Brunel	Presenter: James Dyson
A British mechanical and civil engineer who was the designer of the Great Western Railway, Clifton Suspension Bridge, SS Great Britain and numerous significant ships, tunnels and bridges. He revolutionised public transport and modern engineering.
Subject: James Clerk Maxwell	Presenter: Jim Al-Khalili
A British mathematical physicist who formulated the classical theory of electromagnetic radiation, bringing together for the first time electricity, magnetism, and light as manifestations of the same phenomenon.

Episode 4: Out of the Darkness
Subject: Robert Watson-Watt	Presenter: Jim Al-Khalili
A British pioneer of radar technology who demonstrated the first practical radio system for detecting aircraft when he successfully bounced a radio wave from a BBC short-wave transmitter off a Handley Page Heyford aircraft.
Subject: Alan Turing	Presenter: Richard Dawkins
A British computer scientist, mathematician, logician, cryptanalyst and theoretical biologist who formalised the concepts of algorithm and computation with the Turing machine, which is a model of a general purpose computer.
Subject: Frank Whittle	Presenter: James Dyson
A British Royal Air Force (RAF) engineer air officer. He is credited with single-handedly inventing the turbojet engine. Whittle's jet engines were developed some years earlier than those of Germany's Hans von Ohain who was the designer of the first operational turbojet engine.
Subject: Alexander Fleming	Presenter: Paul Nurse
A British biologist, pharmacologist and botanist who discovered the world's first antibiotic substance benzylpenicillin (Penicillin G) from the mould Penicillium notatum, for which he won the Nobel Prize in Physiology or Medicine.
Subject: Paul Dirac	Presenter: Kathy Sykes
A British theoretical physicist who made fundamental contributions to the early development of both quantum mechanics and quantum electrodynamics. He formulated the Dirac equation which describes the behaviour of fermions and predicted the existence of antimatter.

Episode 5: Asking Big Questions
	Subject: Francis Crick	Presenter: Richard Dawkins
A British molecular biologist, biophysicist, and neuroscientist, most noted for being a co-discoverer of the structure of the DNA molecule in 1953 with James Watson. Together with Watson and Maurice Wilkins, he was jointly awarded the 1962 Nobel Prize in Physiology or Medicine.
	Subject: James D. Watson	Presenter: Richard Dawkins
An American molecular biologist, geneticist and zoologist, best known as one of the co-discoverers of the structure of DNA in 1953 with Francis Crick and Rosalind Franklin.
–	Subject: Rosalind Franklin	Presenter: Olivia Judson
–	A British chemist and X-ray crystallographer who made contributions to the understanding of the molecular structures of DNA (deoxyribonucleic acid), RNA (ribonucleic acid), viruses, coal, and graphite.	
	Subject: Maurice Wilkins	Presenter: Olivia Judson
A New Zealand-born British physicist and molecular biologist, who is best known for his work at King's College London on the structure of DNA, for which he shared the Nobel Prize in Physiology or Medicine with Crick and Watson.
	Subject: Fred Hoyle	Presenter: Jim Al-Khalili
A British astronomer noted primarily for the theory of stellar nucleosynthesis, but also for his often controversial stances on other scientific matters—in particular his rejection of the "Big Bang" theory, a term coined by him on BBC radio, and his promotion of panspermia as the origin of life on Earth.
	Subject: Stephen Hawking	Presenter: Jim Al-Khalili
A British theoretical physicist and cosmologist whose scientific work includes the Penrose–Hawking singularity theorems, the prediction that black holes emit radiation, and a theory of cosmology unifying the general theory of relativity and quantum mechanics.
–	Subject: Bill Hamilton	Presenter: Richard Dawkins
–	A British evolutionary biologist, whose theoretical work expounding a rigorous genetic basis for the existence of altruism provided an insight that was a key part of the development of a gene-centric view of evolution.	
	Subject: Carbon Nanotubes	Presenter: James Dyson
Cylindrical carbon molecules, which are valuable for nanotechnology, electronics, optics and other fields of materials science, including being able to meet the specific strength requirements for a space elevator.
