= European Union Baroque Orchestra =

The European Union Baroque Orchestra (EUBO) is a training initiative that allows young performers of baroque music from the European Union to gain orchestral experience as part of their career development. Its purpose is to bridge the gap between music school study and a professional career. Founded in 1985 and originally based in England, the orchestra moved to Belgium and then Italy following Brexit.

== History ==
=== Origins ===
EUBO was founded in 1985 as an initiative of European Music Year to celebrate the 300th anniversaries of three influential baroque musicians: Johann Sebastian Bach, Domenico Scarlatti, and George Frideric Handel. Since then more than 600 full-time members of EUBO have given over 900 performances, in 54 countries worldwide.

From 1985 to 2017, the European Union Baroque Orchestra was an educational charity registered in England & Wales with its administrative office in Wootton, West Oxfordshire.

EUBO has been Orchestra-in-Residence in Echternach, Luxembourg, from 2008 to 2017; working together with the city of Echternach, Festival International Echternach and the cultural centre Trifolion. EUBO's residency in Echterach and the Echter'Barock series of concerts are funded by grants from the city of Echternach and the Ministry of Culture in Luxembourg.

Between 2015 and 2018 EUBO was partnered by nine European organisations within a co-operation project known as 'EUBO Mobile Baroque Academy', with co-funding from the Creative Europe programme of the European Union. EUBO has been honoured with the permanent status of Cultural Ambassador for the European Union.

=== Impact of Brexit ===
In 2017 the orchestra announced its withdrawal from England and a temporary cessation of its operations as a result of Brexit, with the intention to relocate to the Augustinus Muziekcentrum (AMUZ) in Antwerp in 2018. The COVID-19 pandemic forced a further break in its activities.

=== Relaunch ===
After a four-year break the orchestra was relaunched in 2022 with a funding commitment from Italian foundation ICONS and a base in Italy. Following auditions in 2023, EUBO has given its first performances since its relaunch at the Wratislavia Cantans festival in Poland, Concertgebouw Brugge and AMUZ in Belgium, under the guidance of Enrico Onofri and Francesco Corti.

== Activities ==
EUBO meets several times a year for week-long artistic residencies, followed by short concert tours. The orchestra has performed at several European music festivals and concert halls, including the Amsterdam Concertgebouw, St John's Smith Square in London, the festivals Bachwoche Ansbach, and specialist early music festivals in Utrecht, York, Brugge, Valletta and London. Outside of Europe, the orchestra has toured Japan, United States and South Africa. EUBO has played in Ramallah, the Gaza Strip, Botswana and Soweto.

== Structure ==
The orchestra is renewed every year. Auditions take place in spring, with typically around 100 young baroque musicians applying for the 20–25 places in the ensemble. Members of EUBO gain performing experience; working together under the leadership of baroque music specialists. Lars Ulrik Mortensen (former Music Director), Ton Koopman, Margaret Faultless, Roy Goodman, Enrico Onofri, Rachel Podger, Paul Agnew, Gottfried von der Goltz, Alfredo Bernardini, Sergio Azzolini and Amandine Beyer are amongst the artists who have regularly worked with EUBO.

== Discography ==
- 1990 – Handel – Tamerlano. Roy Goodman, director
- 1991 – William Corbett – Bizzarie Universali. Roy Goodman, director; Andrew Manze, violin
- 1991 – Pieter Hellendaal – 6 Concerti Grossi. Roy Goodman, director; Andrew Manze, violin
- 1992 – Birds, Beasts and Battles. Monica Huggett, conductor/violin
- 1996 – J. S. Bach Markus Passion. Roy Goodman, director; Ring Ensemble of Finland (Musica Oscura)
- 2002 – Handel – Apollo e Dafne, The Alchemist (Naxos Records CD)
- 2002 – Handel, Rameau, Rebel. Roy Goodman, director
- 2003 – The Spirit of History (The Gift of Music CD)
- 2004 – Music for a Great House (The Gift of Music CD)
- 2005 – Rameau: Ballet Suites (Naxos CD)
- 2006 – Bach: Matthäus-Passion, Johannes-Passion, Markus Passion, Lukas Passion (Brilliant Classics CD)
- 2007 – George Frideric Handel, Johann Sterkel, John Stanley – Suites & Solos (The Gift of Music CD)
- 2008 – Jean-Philippe Rameau, Johann Joseph Fux, Johann Sebastian Bach – Baroque Suites. Lars Ulrik Mortensen, director (The Gift of Music CD)
- 2013 – George Frideric Handel – Pure Handel. Lars Ulrik Mortensen, director; Maria Keohane, soprano (ERP 6212)
- 2013 – Handel, Bach, Ferrandini, Torelli – Joy & Sorrow unmasked DVD. Lars Ulrik Mortensen, director (ERP 6412)
- 2013 – G. F. Handel – Peace & Celebration. Lars Ulrik Mortensen, director; The Choir of Clare College Cambridge (OBSIDIAN 711)
- 2014 – A. Vivaldi – The Four Seasons & String Concerti. Lars Ulrik Mortensen, director; Huw Daniel, violin; Bojan Cicic, violin; Johannes Pramsohler, violin; Zefira Valova, violin; Antonio De Sarlo, speaker (OBSIDIAN 713)

== See also ==
- European Union Chamber Orchestra
- European Union Youth Orchestra
- List of youth orchestras
- European Opera Centre
- Chamber Orchestra of Europe
