= Inkha =

Inkha is an interactive robotic head which was created in 2002 at King's College London by Mat Walker and Peter S. Longyear.

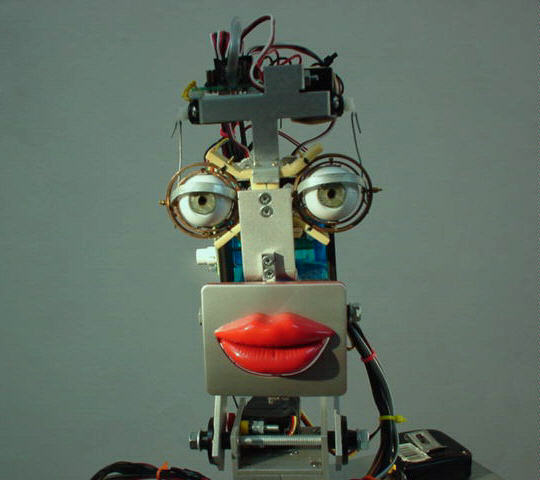
Original Inkha (2002). King's College, London, UK.

Inkha uses a camera in its eye to track the movement of people who come close to it. It moves in a lifelike way based on studies of human movement. Inkha exhibits fright when it sees sudden movements and interest when it sees small movements. It becomes bored and goes to sleep if there is nothing of interest to "see".

Inkha also speaks periodically about facts and astrology and gives out fashion tips.

During 2003 Inkha was enhanced to become a Roboreceptionist at the Strand entrance of King's . This saw the addition of additional sensors, industrial-grade servo motors and a touch screen so that Inkha could give room directions to visitors. The Roboreceptionist operated for over ten years, giving out over 74,000 room directions and making over 81,000 comments. In this time Inkha spoke over a million phrases and the buttons on the touch screen were pressed over 140,000 times. Inkha was decommissioned at King's in October 2014.

Inkha is part of the Science Museum, London's Robots exhibition appearing in London from February to September 2017 and then touring internationally.

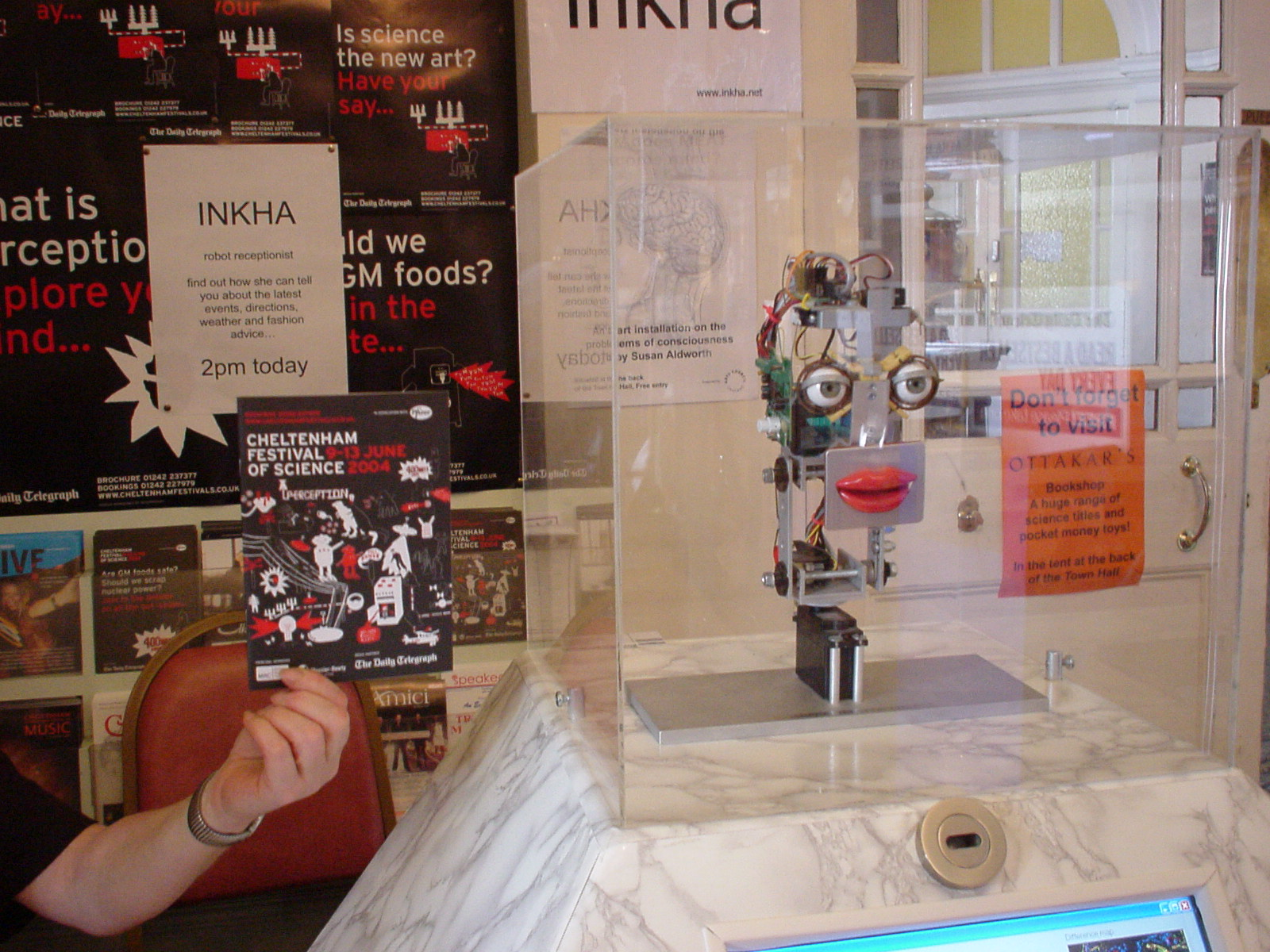
Inkha Roboreceptionist (2004) Cheltenham Science Festival, Cheltenham, UK.

A portable version of Inkha was created and was installed as a Roboreceptionist at the Cheltenham Science Festival each year between 2004 and 2006.

Inkha has appeared on the children's television programme Blue Peter and been the subject of articles in the science journal Nature (reprinted here ) and The Times .

Mat Walker is now working with Dan Warner developing the Ohbot robot for children.
