= Symphony No. 2 (Rubbra) =

Symphony by Edmund Rubbra

The Symphony No. 2 in D, op. 45, by Edmund Rubbra was composed between February and November 1937 and dedicated to Sir Adrian Boult, who conducted the first performance, broadcast on 16 December 1938. Boult had previously conducted the premiere of Rubbra's First Symphony just 20 months earlier.

Rubbra revised the scoring of the Symphony in 1945, reducing the requirement for triple woodwind down to double. He also made cuts to the first movement and revised the ending to finish in D major, somewhat clarifying the symphony's ambiguous tonality: the original version began in D minor and ended in Eb major. The new version, the first example of a 'Cheltenham Symphony', was first performed at the Cheltenham Festival in 1946, with the composer conducting the London Philharmonic Orchestra.

There are four movements:

I Lento rubato. "A movement where the development never ceases".

II Scherzo: Vivace assai. Alternating time signatures (9/8, 15/8), musical battle between C major and C# minor.

III Adagio tranquillo. "One of the most introspective [movements] in all Rubbra's music".

IV Rondo: Allegretto amabile - Coda: Presto. "Predominantly a happy movement [that] must be played with great lilt by a virtuoso orchestra to be the convincing coda to the experiences of the whole symphony".

== Style ==
Robert Matthew-Walker points to the originality of the work's language and form: "linear composition [where] everything in the work grows from the very first idea, announced at once [by the strings] in unison, and without a clear tonality". Schaarwächter calls this Rubbra's 'germinal' technique, "in which the entire material of a movement, or even of the whole of a symphony...is derived from a bud or germ".

Rubbra himself styled this symphony "more asture and contrapuntal" than his first. But he also regarded his first four symphonies as a set. "When symphonies are written in quick succession, the characteristics of each are usually the result of a reaction away from its predecessor....although they are independent works they are somehow different facets of one thought, and a knowledge of all is necessary to a complete understanding of one".

== Recordings ==
- BBC Symphony Orchestra, cond. Adrian Boult, Maida Vale Studios 1954. SOMM CD0179 (2018)
- New Philharmonia Orchestra, cond. Vernon Handley, Kingsway Hall, 4 April 1976. Lyrita SRCD 235 (1992)
- BBC National Orchestra of Wales, cond. Richard Hickox. Recorded 1995. Chandos CHAN9481 (1996)
