= Symphony No. 5 (Arnold) =

Symphony by Malcolm Arnold

The Symphony No. 5, Op. 74 by Malcolm Arnold was finished in 1961. It is in four movements:

1. Tempestuoso
2. Andante con moto – Adagio
3. Con fuoco
4. Risoluto – Lento

The work was commissioned by the Cheltenham Festival Society. The composer conducted the first performance with the Hallé Orchestra on 3 July 1961 at the Cheltenham Music Festival in Cheltenham Town Hall.

The Symphony is a remembrance of four of Arnold's friends who died young:

- Humorist Gerard Hoffnung
- Clarinettist Frederick Thurston
- Ballet choreographer David Paltenghi
- Horn player Dennis Brain

== Commercial recordings ==
- 1973 Malcolm Arnold and the City of Birmingham Symphony Orchestra on EMI Classics His Master's Voice ASD 2878 (LP) (latest re-release on EMI 382 1462)
- 1995 Richard Hickox and the London Symphony Orchestra on Chandos Records CHAN 9385
- 1996 Vernon Handley and the Royal Philharmonic Orchestra on Conifer Records 75605-51257-2 (re-released on Decca 4765337)
- 2000 Douglas Bostock and the Munich Symphony Orchestra on Classico 294
- 2001 Andrew Penny and the RTÉ National Symphony Orchestra on Naxos Records 8.552000 (recorded January 24–25, 2000, in the presence of the composer)
- 2023: Sakari Oramo and the BBC Symphony Orchestra on BBC Music Magazine V31N10 (recorded 27 Aug 2021)
