= Renna Kellaway =

British pianist and music teacher (1931–2024)

Renna Kellaway, Lady Manduell, MBE (18 October 1931 – 26 April 2024) was a South Africa-born British pianist and music teacher.

== Biography ==
Born in Durban, South Africa, Kellaway made her concert debut in Durban City Hall at the age of 13. At seventeen she travelled to Amsterdam to study with Johannes Röntgen (1898–1969), and later with Franz Osborn (1905–1955, a student of Artur Schnabel) in London. She also played for Clara Haskil. Kellaway toured as a concert pianist and chamber musician in Europe, Asia, the US and South Africa, giving master classes and serving as a juror in piano competitions. She participated in and directed the summer music school at Dartington for several years.

Kellaway began teaching at the Birmingham School of Music in the 1970s, and at the Royal Northern College of Music from 1980, becoming Head of Keyboard Studies in 1992 and founding the biennial Glories of the Keyboard Festival at the college in 1995. She left the RNCM in 2000, succeeded by Martin Roscoe. Her pupils there included Caroline Dowdle, Eleanor Hodgkinson, Heejung Kim, Steven Osborne, Carole Presland and Edward Rushton.

Kellaway founded the annual Lake District Summer Music festival in 1985 and ran it for 35 years as artistic director. Musicians who participated in the festival early in their careers included Nicola Benedetti, the Heath String Quartet, Guy Johnston, Steven Osborne, Jennifer Pike and Nikolaj Znaider. She was appointed a Member of the Order of the British Empire (MBE) for services to music in the 2009 New Year Honours. She retired from the post in 2020 and was succeeded by Stephen Threlfall. The Birmingham Conservatoire has established a Renna Kellaway Piano Prize.

== Personal life ==
In September 1955, Kellaway married composer and music educator John Manduell. They moved north in 1968 when he became director of Music at the University of Lancaster. Resident in High Bentham in North Yorkshire, the couple had three sons and a daughter. Kellaway became Lady Manduell upon his knighthood in 1989. The marriage lasted until his death in October 2017.

Kellaway died at her home in High Bentham, on 26 April 2024, at the age of 92.
