= Enrico Onofri =

Italian violinist and conductor

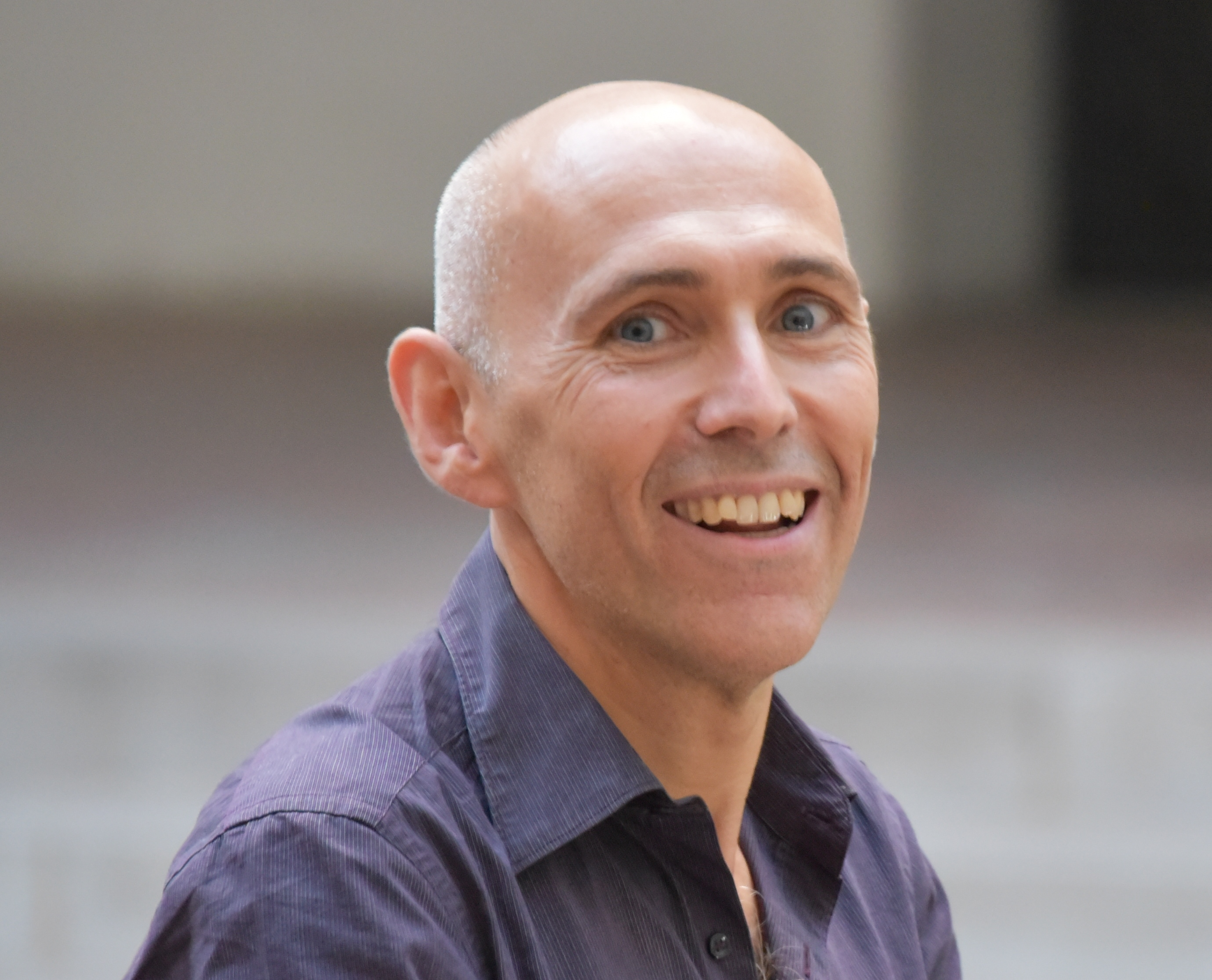
Enrico Onofri 2016

Enrico Onofri (born 1 April 1967) is an Italian violinist and conductor specialising in Baroque music.

== Career ==
Born in Ravenna, Onofri is often invited to participate in the productions of ensembles such as La Capella Reial de Catalunya conducted by Jordi Savall, the Concerto Italiano conducted by Rinaldo Alessandrini and the Concentus Musicus Wien conducted by Nikolaus Harnoncourt.

Since 1987, he has been concertmaster of the ensemble Il Giardino Armonico and has made recordings for the Teldec label, performing the Italian repertoire for violin and orchestra.

Since 2002, Onofri has performed in Europe and Japan also as a conductor. Since 2005, he has been the director of the Divino Sospiro ensemble based at the Belém Cultural Center in Lisbon. In 2000, he founded the ensemble Imaginarium.

A loyal collaborator of Giovanni Antonini and his ensemble Il Giardino Armonico, he recorded the complete Concerti da Camera by Antonio Vivaldi with him. He has recorded for several labels, including Virgin, Opus 111, Teldec, Astrée and Outhere.

In 2008, he was invited to conduct and accompany the European Union Baroque Orchestra (EUBO) on a concert tour through Europe.

Since 2000, he has been teaching Baroque violin at the Bellini Conservatory in Palermo.

== Recordings ==
- Vivaldi, La Follia – Violin Sonatas : Enrico Onofri violon & direction, Imaginarium. 1 CD Sony/Deutsche Harmonia Mundi
- La voce nel violino – music bty Castello, Cima, Fontana, Rognoni, Frescobaldi, Monteverdi, Pandolfi : Enrico Onofri violon & directo, Imaginarium. 1 CD Zig Zag Territoires
- Symphonie n.40 et Serenata Notturna de Wolfgang Amadeus Mozart : Enrico Onofri direction, Divino Sospiro (live recording) – 1 CD + DVD Harbor Records (Nichion)
- Concerti per violino Vol.I "La Caccia", Il Grosso Mogul, RV332, L'Inquietudine, Il Sospetto, La Caccia, Il Riposo by Antonio Vivaldi: Enrico Onofri violon soliste et direction, Academia Montis Regalis. 1 CD Naive, Vivaldi Edition
- Concerti da Camera by Antonio Vivaldi: Il Giardino Armonico - Giovanni Antonini, flûte à bec & direction - Enrico Onofri, solo violin: 1 coffret 4 CD Teldec
- Concerti per mandolini e liuto by Antonio Vivaldi: Il Giardino Armonico - Giovanni Antonini, direction - Enrico Onofri, solo violin - Duilio Galfetti & Wolfgang Paul, mandolines - Luca Pianca, luth: 1 CD Teldec
- Il Proteo o sia il Mondo al Rovescio Antonio Vivaldi: Il Giardino Armonico - Giovanni Antonini, direction - Enrico Onofri, solo violin- Christophe Coin, cello: 1 CD Teldec
- Le Quattro Stagioni by Antonio Vivaldi: Il Giardino Armonico - Giovanni Antonini, direction - Enrico Onofri, violon solo: 1 CD Teldec
- Concerti per violino Op. 8 by Antonio Vivaldi: Il Giardino Armonico - Giovanni Antonini, direction - Enrico Onofri, solo violin: 1 CD Teldec
- Il Combattimento di Tancredi e Clorinda by Claudio Monteverdi: Ensemble Concerto - Roberto Gini, direction - Enrico Onofri, first violin: 1 CD Tactus: "The Vivaldi Album", Cecilia Bartoli mezzo-soprano, Il Giardino Armonico, Enrico Onofri first violin and solo. 1 CD Decca
- Concerti per archi by Antonio Vivaldi: Concerto Italiano - Rinaldo Alessandrini, clavecin & direction - Enrico Onofri, solo violin: 1 CD Tactus
- Il Settimo Libro de Madrigali by Claudio Monteverdi: Ensemble Concerto - Roberto Gini, direction - Enrico Onofri, first violin: 2 CD Tactus
- Vespro della Beata Vergine by Claudio Monteverdi: La Capella Reial de Catalunya - Jordi Savall, viole de gambe & direction - Enrico Onofri, solo violin: 2 CD Astrée
- Brandenburg Concertos by Johann Sebastian Bach: Il Giardino Armonico - Giovanni Antonini, flûte à bec & direction - Enrico Onofri, solo violin: 2 CD Teldec
- Cantate da camera by George Frideric Handel: Il Giardino Armonico - Giovanni Antonini, direction - Eva Mei, soprano - Enrico Onofri, first violon: 1 CD Teldec
