= Symphony No. 3 (Rubbra) =

Symphony by Edmund Rubbra

Symphony No. 3 in D, op. 49, by Edmund Rubbra was begun in 1938 and completed just before the war in 1939. The premiere had been scheduled to take place at the Proms in London on 23 September 1940, but was cancelled due to an air raid. Instead, the first performance was on 15 December 1940 in Manchester, where it was performed by the Hallé Orchestra conducted by Malcolm Sargent. It was eventually heard at the Proms on 24 August 1945, conducted by Adrian Boult. And it was repeated in 1947 at the Three Choirs Festival in Gloucester.

The score is dedicated to the critic and scholar Arthur Hutchings, who judged it "the finest English work in that form since Elgar's Second". Rubbra’s friend Bernard Herrmann was a later champion of the work.

There are four movements:

I Moderato. In contrast to Rubbra's first two symphonies, this opening movement stays closer to classical sonata form.

II Allegro. Features a distorted reference to Beethoven's 'fate' motto from the 5th Symphony.

III Molto adagio ma liberamente. Notable for its cross rhythms and long melodic lines. Robert Layton highlights this as the movement with the greatest substance and depth.

IV Tema con 7 variaioni e una Fuga. A set of seven variations and a fugue, which takes its material from the opening of the first movement. In 1938 Rubbra had orchestrated the Brahms Variations and Fugue on a Theme by Handel.

== Style ==
After the austerity of the first two symphonies, the Third Symphony is more relaxed and melodic. According to Louis Blois "the composer's intellect [is] less in competition with his lyrical gift". Andrew Achenbach has commented that the work shows Rubbra "at his most lyrically genial, yet the purposeful thrust and riveting concentration of the writing are never in doubt."

Rubbra wrote his first four symphonies in quick succession (between 1935 and 1941), and regarded them as a closely related set.

== Recordings ==
- Philharmonia Orchestra, cond. Norman Del Mar. Lyrita SRCD202 (1990)
- BBC National Orchestra of Wales, cond. Richard Hickox. CHAN9634 (1998)
