= John Manduell =

Composer and college principal (1928–2017)

Sir John Manduell CBE (2 March 1928 – 25 October 2017) was a British radio executive, and administrator and composer in the field of classical music. He was the founding principal of the Royal Northern College of Music from 1973 to 1996 and the director of the Cheltenham Music Festival. He also founded the European Opera Centre.

== Early life and education ==
Manduell was born in Johannesburg, son of Matthewman Donald Manduell, of Cumbrian origin, a "leading headmaster" at Jeppe High School for Boys who had been a Major in the Royal Field Artillery during the First World War and was awarded the Military Cross and Croix de Guerre, and Theodora (née Tharp), a physiotherapist and "inveterate lacrosse enthusiast". The Manduells were long-established farmers at Wigton, Cumbria.

At the age of ten, his family returned to England. He was educated at the Haileybury independent school near Hertford, then in Strasbourg, and at his father's alma mater, Jesus College, Cambridge, where he read Modern Languages. He then joined the Royal Academy of Music, where his composition teachers were William Alwyn and Sir Lennox Berkeley. He also undertook a brief period of study with Nadia Boulanger.

== Career ==
From 1956, Manduell worked at the BBC as a producer in London, and from 1961 as head of music for the Midlands and East Anglia. In 1964 he inaugurated the all-day Music Programme, which later evolved into BBC Radio 3. He stayed at the BBC until 1968.

He became the Cheltenham Festival's first programme director in 1969, continuing until 1994. He was then appointed as the first Director of Music at the University of Lancaster, before accepting an invitation to become founding principal of the Royal Northern College of Music in 1971, a post he held until his retirement in 1996. The new college was a fraught amalgamation of two long-established colleges; the Telegraph would later write that "under his energetic direction, it became one of the leading musical academies in Europe, if not the world".

He held many other offices, and was the first chairman of the European Opera Centre in Liverpool from 1997. Manduell was appointed CBE in 1982 and was knighted in the 1989 Birthday Honours. A memoir, No Bartok Before Breakfast, was published in 2016.

Manduell lived with his wife, the pianist Renna Kellaway (1934–2024), in Bentham, North Yorkshire, where he died, aged 89, in October 2017. Kellaway kept up her links with the area as artistic director of the Lake District Summer Music Festival.

== Commissions and tributes ==
In his various roles Manduell encouraged and promoted the work of young composers. Some 250 works were presented as a result of commissions by Manduell. Works dedicated to or commissioned by him include Lennox Berkeley's Antiphon (dedicated to Manduell, and performed in Cheltenham on multiple occasions from 1973), the 1983 Elegy and Scherzo Alla Marcia for strings by Gordon Crosse and Another Dream Carousel for string orchestra by Anthony Gilbert.

In 2015, the Gradi Ensemble – Claire Bradshaw (mezzo-soprano), Henry Herford (baritone), Craig Ogden (guitar), John Turner (recorder), Renna Kellaway (piano) – with The New Ensemble and Nossek String Quartet, issued The Music of John Manduell. In 2020, Divine Art issued the CD Songs for Sir John as a tribute featuring works by 16 composers from different generations. A second volume, The Fabulous Sir John followed in 2022, including further tribute pieces and a sequence of works by Manduell.

In 2023, a bronze head and shoulders sculpture of Manduell was commissioned from sculptor Hazel Reeves and was unveiled in June 2024 ahead of a concert featuring the RNCM Chamber Orchestra and Chamber Choir, under the direction of conductor David Hill.

== Compositions ==
As a composer Manduell wrote mostly chamber and orchestral works. Early pieces include the Belloc Variations for piano and orchestra, performed by soloist Renna Kellaway (his future wife), and the Trois Chansons de la Renaissance, which have been recorded. There is a Viola Concerto from 1964 and a set of symphonic variations, Diversions (1969), for chamber orchestra. His String Quartet (1970), the solo clarinet work Prayers from the Ark (1978, first performed by Jack Brymer) and the Double Concerto (for solo Di-zi & Erhu, strings and percussion) were commissioned by the Cardiff Festival. Vistas, a large form orchestral work, was commissioned by the Halle Orchestra and Kent Nagano and premiered in 1997. His string octet Rondo for Nine (2005) has been recorded by the Manchester Chamber Ensemble, conducted by Richard Howarth.
