= Cheltenham Music Festival =

UK music festival

Coordinates: 51.890°N 2.078°W

The Cheltenham Music Festival is a British music festival, held annually in Cheltenham in the summer months (June, July) since 1945. The festival is renowned for premieres of contemporary music – in its early days especially British music – hosting over 250 music premieres as of July 2004. The name was changed to the Cheltenham International Music Festival in 1974, and back to the Cheltenham Music Festival in 2005.

== History ==
The first annual Cheltenham Music Festival was inaugurated in 1945, run by the Cheltenham Corporation and taking place over three evenings in mid-June. From the start it was intended as an event to highlight new British music. The London Philharmonic Orchestra was engaged with conductor Basil Cameron, alongside three composer-conductors: Benjamin Britten (conducting his Four Sea Interludes and Canadian Carnival), William Walton (Sinfonia Concertante) and Arthur Bliss (extracts from Miracle in the Gorbals).

In 1948 the Hallé Orchestra under John Barbirolli became the resident orchestra for the next 15 years. Barbirolli was less comfortable with new repertoire; he described Peter Racine Fricker's First Symphony (performed in 1950) as "Frickery trickery" and asked Richard Arnell to cut twenty minutes from his Third Symphony (1953). This led overall to the presentation of safer choices and less challenging music, creating tension with sponsors such as the BBC and the Arts Council. To address this, George Weldon was appointed associate conductor, and the Composers' Guild and the Society for the Promotion of New Music were brought in to recommend new works.

In the first 25 years of the festival, the most performed British composers were Britten (34 works), Alan Rawsthorne (25), Lennox Berkeley (18), Walton (17), Arnold Bax (15) and Bliss (15). Bliss became president of the Festival in 1962. The Festival soon established the practice of commissioning substantial works, which led to the concept of the "Cheltenham Symphony" and the "Cheltenham Concerto" – terms sometimes used disparagingly.

John Manduell was appointed as the first Programme Director (de facto artistic director) for the 1969 festival, overseeing 25 seasons until 1994 and commissioning some 250 new works. These included Lennox Berkeley's Antiphon (dedicated to Manduell, and performed in Cheltenham on multiple occasions from 1973), the 1983 Elegy and Scherzo Alla Marcia for strings by Gordon Crosse and Another Dream Carousel for string orchestra by Anthony Gilbert.

Concerts are held in multiple venues, including the Cheltenham Town Hall and the Pittville Pump Room.

== 2026 festival ==
The 2026 Cheltenham Music Festival took place from 3 to 11 July. The programme featured music across classical, jazz, folk and world music, with performances held at venues including Pittville Pump Room and Cheltenham Town Hall. The festival also introduced performances at DEYA Brewery, a new venue for the festival. Independent music publication The Jazz Mann reviewed performances by Za Górami and the Senegalese-Irish duo Dudu Kouate and Shunya during the festival.

== Cheltenham Symphonies (1945–1964) ==
- 1946 – Edmund Rubbra: Symphony No. 2 (1937, rev. 1945)
- 1947 – Ian Whyte: Symphony No. 1
- 1948 – Arthur Benjamin: Symphony No. 1
- 1949 – Richard Arnell: Symphony No. 4
- 1950 – William Alwyn: Symphony No. 1. Anthony Collins: Symphony No. 2 (for strings). Peter Racine Fricker: Symphony No. 1
- 1951 – Malcolm Arnold: Symphony No. 1. John Gardner: Symphony No. 1. Arnold van Wyk: Symphony No. 1. Edmund Rubbra. Symphony No. 5
- 1952 – John Veale: Symphony No. 1
- 1953 – Richard Arnell: Symphony No. 3. Iain Hamilton: Symphony No. 2. William Wordsworth: Symphony No. 3
- 1954 – Stanley Bate: Symphony No. 3. Geoffrey Bush: Symphony No. 1
- 1956 – Daniel Jones: Symphony No. 3
- 1957 – Arthur Butterworth: Symphony No. 1. Robert Simpson: Symphony No. 2
- 1960 – Benjamin Frankel: Symphony No. 1
- 1961 – Malcolm Arnold: Symphony No. 5
- 1962 – Benjamin Frankel: Symphony No. 2; Alun Hoddinott: Symphony No. 2; Robert Simpson: Symphony No. 2
- 1964 – Alan Rawsthorne: Symphony No. 3

== Cheltenham Concertos (1945–1962) ==
- 1946 – Benjamin Britten: Piano Concerto (revised)
- 1947 – Alan Rawsthorne: Concerto for oboe and strings
- 1948 – Alan Rawsthorne: Violin Concerto No. 1
- 1949 – Handel-Barbirolli: Concerto for viola and strings
- 1950 – Francis Baines: Concerto for trumpet and strings. Arnold Bax: Concertante for piano (left hand) and orchestra.
- 1951 – Alan Rawsthorne: Piano Concerto No. 2. Handel-Barbirolli. Concerto for clarinet and strings
- 1952 – Arthur Benjamin: Piano Concerto quasi una fantasia
- 1954 – Graham Whettam: Viola Concerto. Peter Racine Fricker: Violin Concerto No. 2. Alun Hoddinott: Concerto for clarinet and strings
- 1955 – Gerald Finzi: Cello Concerto. William Alwyn: Autumn Legend for cor anglais and strings. Brian Easdale: Concerto lirico for piano and orchestra. Humphrey Searle: Piano Concerto No. 2
- 1956 – Kenneth Leighton: Cello Concerto
- 1957 – Arnold Cooke: Concerto for clarinet and strings. Malcolm Arnold: Horn Concerto No. 2. John Gardner: Piano Concerto No. 1
- 1958 – Malcolm Williamson: Piano Concerto. Alan Hoddinott: Harp Concerto. Mátyás Seiber: Tre Pezzi for cello and orchestra
- 1959 – Arnold Cooke: Violin Concerrto. Malcolm Lipkin: Piano Concerto. Iain Hamilton: Violin Concerto
- 1960 – Ralph W Wood: Piano Concerto
- 1961 – Alan Rawsthorn: Concerto for ten instruments
- 1962 – Alexander Goehr: Violin Concerto

== Artistic directors ==
- John Manduell (1969–1994)
- Michael Berkeley (1995–2004)
- Martyn Brabbins (2005–2007)
- Meurig Bowen (2007–2017)
- Alison Balsom (2018–2019)
- Camilla King (2019–2021)
- Michael Duffy (2022–present)

== See also ==
- Cheltenham Festivals
