= Edmund Rubbra =

British composer (1901-1986)

- Rubbra in 1948
- Born: Charles Edmund Rubbra; 23 May 1901; Semilong, Northampton, England
- Died: 14 February 1986 (aged 84)
- Occupation: Composer

Edmund Rubbra (/ˈrʌbrə/; 23 May 1901 – 14 February 1986) was a British composer. He composed both instrumental and vocal works for soloists, chamber groups and full choruses and orchestras. He was greatly esteemed by fellow musicians and was at the peak of his fame in the mid-20th century. The best known of his pieces are his eleven symphonies. Although he was active at a time when many people wrote twelve-tone music, he decided not to write in this idiom; instead, he devised his own distinctive style. His later works were not as popular with the concert-going public as his previous ones had been, although he never lost the respect of his colleagues. Therefore, his output as a whole is less celebrated today than would have been expected from its early popularity. He was the brother of the engineer Arthur Rubbra.

== Early life ==
He was born Charles Edmund Rubbra at 21 Arnold Road, Semilong, Northampton. His parents encouraged him in his music, but they were not professional musicians, though his mother had a good voice and sang in the church choir, and his father played the piano a little, by ear. Rubbra's artistic and sensitive nature was apparent from early on. He remembered waking one winter's morning when he was about three or four years old, and noticing something different about the light in his bedroom; there was light where there was usually shadow, and vice versa. When his father came into the room, Edmund asked him why this was. His father explained that there had been a fall of snow during the night, and so the sunlight was reflecting off the snow and entering Edmund's bedroom from below, instead of above, thus reversing the patterns of light and shade. When Rubbra was much older he came to realise that this 'topsy-turveydom', as he called it, had caused him to often use short pieces of melody which would sound good, both in their original form and when inverted (so that when the original melody goes up a certain amount, the inverted one goes down the same amount). He then set these two melodies together, but slightly offset from one another, so that the listener hears the melody going up, say, then an echo where it goes down instead.

Another childhood memory which Rubbra identified as later affecting his music, took place when he was nine or ten. He was out walking with his father on a hot summer Sunday. As they rested by a gate, looking down at Northampton, he heard distant bells, 'whose music seemed suspended in the still air', as he put it. He was lost in the magic of the moment, losing all sense of the scenery round about him, just being aware of "downward drifting sounds that seemed isolated from everything else around". He traces the 'downward scales that constantly act as focal points in [his] textures' to this experience.

Rubbra took piano lessons from a local woman with a good reputation and a piano with discoloured ivory keys. This instrument contrasted starkly with the piano on which Rubbra practised, which was a new demonstration upright piano, lent to his family by his uncle by marriage. This uncle owned a piano and music shop, and prospective buyers would come to Rubbra's house, where he would demonstrate the quality of the piano by playing Mozart's Sonata in C to them. If the sale went through, the Rubbra family was given commission, and a new demonstration piano took the place of the one sold.

In 1912, Rubbra and his family moved a little more than quarter of a mile away to 1 Balfour Road, Kingsthorpe, Northampton, moving again four years later so that his father could start his own business selling and repairing clocks and watches. At this house, above the shop, Edmund had the back bedroom for his work, but the stairs were not wide enough to allow the piano to be brought up, so the window frame of his room had to be removed to get the piano in from outside.

== Education and career ==
Rubbra started composing while he was still at school. One of his masters, Mr. Grant, asked him to compose a school hymn. He would have been very familiar with hymn tunes, as he attended a Congregational church and played the piano for the Sunday School. He also worked as an errand boy whilst he was still at school, giving some of his earnings to his parents.

At the age of 14, he left school and started work in the office of Crockett and Jones, one of Northampton's many boot and shoe manufacturers. Edmund was delighted to be able to accrue a number of stamps from parcels and letters sent to this factory, as stamp-collecting was one of his hobbies. Later, he was invited by an uncle, who owned another boot and shoe factory, to come and work for him. The idea was that he would work his way up from the bottom of the company, with a view to ownership when his uncle, who had no sons of his own, died. Edmund, influenced by his mother's lack of enthusiasm for the idea, declined. Instead, he took a job as a correspondence clerk in a railway station. In his last year at school he had learned shorthand, which was an ideal qualification for this post. He also continued to study harmony, counterpoint, piano and organ, working at these things daily, before and after his clerk's job.

Rubbra's early forays into chamber music composition included a violin and piano sonata for himself and his friend, Bertram Ablethorpe, and a piece for a local string quartet. He used to meet with the keen young composer William Alwyn, who was also from Northampton, to compare notes.

Rubbra was deeply affected by a sermon he heard given by a Chinese Christian missionary, Kuanglin Pao. He was inspired to write Chinese Impressions – a set of piano pieces, which he dedicated to the preacher. This was the beginning of a lifelong interest in things eastern.

At the age of 17, Rubbra decided to organise a concert devoted entirely to Cyril Scott's music, with a singer, violinist, cellist and himself on the piano, at the Carnegie Hall in Northampton Library. This proved to be a very important decision which would change his life. The minister from Rubbra's church attended the concert, and secretly sent a copy of the programme to Cyril Scott. The result of this was that Scott took Rubbra on as a pupil. Rubbra was able to obtain cheap rail travel because of his job with the railway, so he was able to get to Scott's house by train, paying only a quarter of the usual fare. After a year or so, Rubbra gained a scholarship to University College, Reading. Gustav Holst became one of his teachers there. Both Scott and Holst had an interest in eastern philosophy and religion, inspiring Rubbra to take a further interest in the subject.

Holst also taught at the Royal College of Music and advised Rubbra to apply for an open scholarship there. His advice was followed and the place was secured. Before Rubbra's last term at the college, he was unexpectedly invited to play the piano for the Arts League of Service Travelling Theatre on a six-week tour of Yorkshire, since their usual pianist had been taken ill. He accepted this offer despite this meaning that he missed his last term. The tour provided him with invaluable experience in playing and composing theatre music, which he never regretted and which stood him in good stead for his later dramatic work. In the mid-1920s Rubbra used to earn money playing piano for dancers from the Diaghilev Ballet. At around this time he became firm friends with Gerald Finzi.

In 1941, Rubbra was called up for army service. After 18 months he was given an office post, again because of his knowledge of shorthand and typing. While he was there, he ran a small orchestra assisted by a double-bass player from the BBC orchestra. The War Office asked him to form a piano trio to play classical chamber music to the troops. Rubbra was happy to oblige, and the trio, with William Pleeth the cellist, Joshua Glazier violinist and himself on the piano took six months acquiring a repertoire of chamber music. "The Army Classical Music Group", was formed and later expanded to seven people. On one occasion an overzealous entertainment officer thought there would be a better audience by advertising with big posters for "Ed Rub & his seven piece Band". They travelled all over England and Scotland and then to Germany, with their own grand piano which, with its legs removed for transport, became a seat for them in the back of the transport lorry.

After the war, on 4 August 1947 (the Feast of St Dominic), Rubbra became a Roman Catholic, writing a special mass in celebration. Also at this time, the University of Oxford was forming a faculty of music. They invited Rubbra to be a lecturer there. After much thought, he accepted the post. From 1947 to 1968 Rubbra was a lecturer at the Music Faculty and a Fellow of Worcester College, Oxford. The army trio kept meeting, playing at clubs and broadcasting, for a number of years, but eventually Rubbra was too busy to continue with it.

It is a measure of the high esteem in which Rubbra was held in the 1940s, that his Sinfonia Concertante and his song Morning Watch were played alongside such works as Elgar's The Dream of Gerontius, Kodály's Missa Brevis and Vaughan Williams's Job, at the 1948 Three Choirs Festival.

When Vaughan Williams heard that the University of Durham was going to confer an Honorary D.Mus on Rubbra in 1949, he wrote him a very short letter: "I am delighted to hear of the honour which Durham University is conferring on itself."

Rubbra received a request from the BBC to write a piece for the coronation of Queen Elizabeth II. The result was Ode to the Queen, for voice and orchestra, to Elizabethan words. In connection with the same occasion, he was invited by Benjamin Britten to contribute to a collaborative work, a set of Variations on an Elizabethan Theme. He initially accepted, but later withdrew; Britten then asked Arthur Oldham and Humphrey Searle to take his place.

On Rubbra's retirement from Oxford, in 1968, he did not stop working; he merely took up more teaching at the Guildhall School of Music and Drama where his students included Michael Garrett and Christopher Gunning. Neither did he stop composing. Indeed, he kept up this activity right until the end of his life: he started a 12th Symphony in March 1985, less than a year before his death, but only one page of manuscript short score (bearing the opus number 164) was completed. He died in Gerrards Cross on 14 February 1986.

Ronald Stevenson summed up the style of Rubbra's work rather succinctly when he wrote, "In an age of fragmentation, Rubbra stands (with a few others) as a composer of a music of oneness".

Sir Adrian Boult commended Rubbra's work by saying that he "has never made any effort to popularize anything he has done, but he goes on creating masterpieces".

== Personal life ==
Rubbra was married three times, firstly in 1925 to his landlady Lilian Duncan. This marriage was never consummated and in 1933 Rubbra married Antoinette Chaplin, a French violinist. They toured Italy together, as well as giving recitals in Paris and radio broadcasts. They had two sons, Francis (1935–2012) and Benedict (1938–2024, painter), with the marriage lasting into the late 1950s.

In the 1930s Rubbra was a pacifist and vegetarian but gave up vegetarianism during World War II, whilst he was in the army, out of fear of starvation. Although he became a devout Catholic through a mid-life conversion, he was also interested in Eastern thought and mysticism, going through a Buddhist phase.

In 1975, Rubbra married Colette Yardley, with whom he had had one son (born 1974) called Adrian. Colette was at the time of Adrian's birth married to Rubbra's neighbour Hugo Yardley.

== Compositions ==
Rubbra did not base his composition on formal rules, preferring to work from an initial idea and discover the music as he composed. His style is more concerned with the melodic lines in his music than with the chords, and this gives his music a vocal feel. He found his method of composition, working from a single melodic idea and letting the music grow from that, to be very exciting.

=== Symphonies ===
It was not until 1937 that Rubbra's first symphony was completed. Symphonies 2, 3 and 4 followed in quick succession, the fourth being completed in March 1942. He described them as being 'different facets of one thought', since each was a reaction to the last.

His fifth Symphony was started in August 1947. Enough time had elapsed since the fourth Symphony, to allow this new symphony to be unrelated. Grover recognises a "sense of relaxation engendered by a greater flexibility in the handling of materials" which sets this work apart from earlier symphonies. The sixth and seventh symphonies followed in 1954 and 1957.

Rubbra's last four symphonies again show a change of approach. He himself identified this when he said, "in much of my later music a particular musical interval rather than a key underlies the building of the structure". These symphonies were composed between 1968 and 1979. All are available on CD. Richard Hickox recorded the complete cycle of symphonies on Chandos Records.

=== Vocal music ===
The vast majority (42 of 59 works) of Rubbra's choral works have religious or philosophical texts, in keeping with his interest in these subjects. His first choral work was his Op. 3, written in 1924, and his last was Op. 164, written in 1984, only two years before his death. He wrote for children's voices and madrigals, as well as producing masses and motets, including the Nine Tenebrae Motets, Op. 72, setting the responsories for Maundy Thursday in an intensely dramatic manner. In 1948, he composed Missa Sancti Dominici, Op. 66, to celebrate his conversion to Roman Catholicism. The reason for this particular title is that he was received into the church on the Feast of St. Dominic, 4 August. His Magnificat and Nunc Dimittis in A♭ is still performed in Anglican cathedrals and larger parish churches.

Rubbra's songs are not well known, but, again they spanned his whole composing lifetime: Rosa Mundi, Op. 2, was the first published, in 1921; Fly Envious Time, Op. 148, was the last, in 1974, being inscribed "in Memoriam Gerald Finzi". Fewer than half of them have the piano specified for their accompaniment, though only one is unaccompanied. The others have string quartet, string orchestra or harp as their chosen accompaniment, except for the three songs published as Ode to the Queen, which have full orchestral accompaniment.

=== Chamber music ===
Although Rubbra was a fine pianist, his works for solo piano occupy only a minor part of his output. He did, however, write diverse chamber music throughout his career. He considered that his Violin Sonata, Op. 31, which he wrote in 1932, was the first of his compositions to be taken seriously in the musical world. His First String Quartet was composed only a year later. For a long time Rubbra was not satisfied with this piece, although Ralph Vaughan Williams was very interested in it. Finally he thoroughly revised it, and published it in 1946, with an inscription to Vaughan Williams, and destroyed the original finale. Three other string quartets followed at long intervals. The last was written in 1977 in memory of Bennett Tarshish, a young American admirer of Rubbra's work, who died in his thirties. This piece shows the same method of reliance on a certain interval or intervals (here the seventh) instead of a particular key, which is also evident in Rubbra's later symphonies.

The Cello Sonata of 1946 was dedicated to William Pleeth (the cellist in The Army Classical Music Group) and his wife. It was sometimes performed by Jacqueline du Pré, who was a pupil of William Pleeth. Rubbra's Second Piano Trio, Op. 138, was first performed by the members of The Army Classical Music Group, who got together again especially for this performance in 1970, though Glazier had now been replaced by Gruenberg.

The repertoire for recorder was both augmented and enhanced by several works composed by Rubbra. Foreman considers that these pieces are "significant for their demonstration of an idiomatic recorder style which successfully places the instrument as an equal with other instruments". This recorder music was written for Carl Dolmetsch, son of Arnold Dolmetsch, and almost every piece makes reference to 16th-century music, for example, Passacaglia sopra 'Plusieurs Regrets' for treble recorder and harpsichord.

Other chamber works in Rubbra's oeuvre include those for oboe, cor anglais and viola.
The Quartets have all appeared on the Dutton Epoch label.

=== Other works ===
Incidental music for several plays formed a small but significant part of Rubbra's output. The longest of these is the unpublished score for Macbeth. In 1933, he wrote a one-act opera, still in manuscript, which he originally called Bee-bee-bei, but renamed The Shadow. It reflects his interest in the East, as it is set in Kashmir.

All three of his works for brass instruments were commissioned. One of them, Variations on "The Shining River", was a test piece for the Brass Band Championships of Great Britain, 1958, held in the Royal Albert Hall.

Rubbra's last completed work was his Sinfonietta for large string orchestra, Op. 163, which was commissioned by the Albany Symphony Orchestra, for performance in 1986 as part of the tricentennial celebrations of the founding of New York. The dedication is "For Adrian and Julian", Julian [Yardley] (b. 1942) being Adrian's elder brother and Rubbra's stepson following his marriage to Adrian and Julian's mother in 1975. The Sinfonietta received excellent press reviews .

Rubbra is also well known for his 1938 orchestration of Johannes Brahms's piano work Variations and Fugue on a Theme by Handel. He also orchestrated Rachmaninov's Prelude in G minor, though when this was recorded by Frederick Fennell and the London Pops Orchestra in 1959 for 'Mercury', he was not given due credit on the LP sleeve or label.

== Partial list of works ==
=== Orchestral ===
- Symphonies
  - Symphony No. 1, Op. 44 (1935–37)
  - Symphony No. 2 in D, Op. 45 (1937, rev. 1945-6 and 1949-1950)
  - Symphony No. 3, Op. 49 (1938–39)
  - Symphony No. 4, Op. 53 (1940–42)
  - Symphony No. 5 in B♭, Op. 63 (1947–48)
  - Symphony No. 6, Op. 80 (1953–54)
  - Symphony No. 7 in C, Op. 88 (1956–57) (dedicated to the City of Birmingham Symphony Orchestra and premiered by them with Andrzej Panufnik conducting)
  - Symphony No. 8, Op. 132, Hommage à Teilhard de Chardin (1966–68)
  - Symphony No. 9, Op. 140, Resurrection (also known as Sinfonia Sacra) (1968–72) ()
  - Symphony No. 10, Op. 145, da Camera (1974)
  - Symphony No. 11, Op. 153, à Colette (1980)
  - Sinfonietta for large string orchestra, Op.163
- A Tribute, Op. 56 (1942) for the celebration of Ralph Vaughan Williams's 70th birthday
- Improvisations on Virginal Pieces by Giles Farnaby, Op. 50
- Overture Resurgam (Plymouth 1942), Op. 149

=== Concertante ===
- Piano
  - Piano Concerto, Op. 30 (1932, premiered 1933, then withdrawn)
  - Sinfonia Concertante in C, Op. 38 (1934–36, rev. early 1940s)
  - Piano Concerto in G, Op. 85 (1956)
- Violin
  - Violin Concerto in A, Op. 103
  - Improvisation for Violin and Orchestra, Op. 89
- Viola
  - Viola Concerto in A, Op. 75
- Cello
  - Soliloquy, Op. 57 for cello, two horns, timpani and strings

=== Instrumental ===
- Violin Sonatas
  - Violin Sonata No. 1, Op. 11
  - Violin Sonata No. 2, Op. 31
  - Violin Sonata No. 3, Op. 133
- Cello Sonata in G, Op. 60
- Meditationi sur Coeurs Désolés (for Recorder and Harpsichord or Flute or Oboe and Piano), Op. 67
- Oboe Sonata in C, Op. 100
- Meditations on a Byzantine Hymn (for solo Viola), Op. 117
- Sonatina for Treble Recorder and Harpsichord, Op. 128
- Fantasia on a Chord: for Treble Recorder, Harpsichord and Viola da Gamba (ad lib.), Op. 154
- Duo for Cor Anglais and Piano, Op. 156

=== Chamber ===
- String Quartets
  - String Quartet No. 1 in F minor, Op. 35
  - String Quartet No. 2 in E♭, Op. 73
  - String Quartet No. 3, Op. 112
  - String Quartet No. 4, Op. 150
- Piano Trio No. 1, Op. 68, in one movement
- Piano Trio No. 2, Op. 138
- Fantasia on a Theme of Machaut, Op. 86, for Flute, Harpsichord, and String Quartet
- Lyric Movement for String Quartet and Piano, Op. 24

=== Choral ===
- Dormi Jesu, Op. 3
- Five Motets, Op. 37 for unaccompanied SATB choir
- Five Madrigals, Op. 51 for unaccompanied SATB choir
- Missa Cantuariensis, Op. 59 for double choir
- Magnificat and Nunc dimittis in A♭, Op. 65 for chorus and organ
- Missa in honorem Sancti Dominici, Op. 66 (Rubbra's first Roman Catholic mass and the result of his conversion)
- Three Motets, Op. 76 for unaccompanied SATB choir
- Nine Tenebrae Motets, Op. 72 (a, b and c, three sets of three written over a period of time)
- Song Of The Soul (in intimate communication and union with the love of God) for mixed chorus and string orchestra, harp and timpani, Op. 78
- Festival Gloria, Op. 94 for unaccompanied SATB choir
- Cantata di Camera: Crucifixus pro Nobis, Op. 111 (1961), for solo tenor, SATB choir and chamber ensemble
- That Virgin's Child Most Meek, Op. 114
- And when the builders Op. 125 for SATB choir and organ
- Missa Brevis, Op. 137 for treble voices and organ

=== For chorus and orchestra ===
- The Morning Watch, Op. 55
- Song of the Soul, Op. 78
- Inscape (Gerard Manley Hopkins), Op. 122
- Veni Creator Spiritus, Op. 130
- Advent Cantata: Natum Maria Virgine, Op. 136 for baritone, chorus and orchestra

=== Piano music ===
- Sonatina, Op. 19
- Introduction & Fugue, Op. 19c
- Prelude and fugue on a theme by Cyril Scott (also played on organ), Op. 69
- Nine teaching pieces, Op. 74 (requires a second pianist)
- Introduction, Aria and Fugue, Op. 104
- Eight preludes, Op. 131
- Four studies, Op. 139
- Invention on the name of Haydn, Op. 160
- Fantasy-fugue, Op. 161
- Fukagawa (without opus)
- Nemo fugue (without opus)

=== Songs ===
- Two Songs, Op. 2 (1921)
  1. Easter
  2. Rosa Mundi
- Two Songs with String Quartet, Op. 3
  1. Tears
  2. A Litany
- Two Songs, Op. 4
  1. The Mystery
  2. Jesukin
- O My Deir Hert, Op. 5
- Two Songs with String Quartet, Op. 7
  1. Rejection
  2. Entrez-y-Tous en Sûreté
- Four Songs, Op. 8
  1. A Cradle Song
  2. There Is a lady
  3. Who Is Sylvia?
  4. Orpheus
- Three Songs, Op. 13
  1. Out in the Dark
  2. Hymn to the Virgin
  3. It Was A Lover
- Two Songs, Op. 14
  1. The Night
  2. Slow Spring
- Rune of Hospitality, Op. 15
- Two Songs, Op. 17
  1. A Prayer
  2. Invocation to Spring
- Rhapsody, Op. 18
- A Duan of Barra, Op. 20
- Soontree, Op. 21
- Two Songs, Op. 22
  1. Take, O Take Those Lips Away
  2. Why So Pale and Wan
- The Song of the Laverock, Op. 23
- Ballad of Tristram, Op. 26
- A Widow Bird State Mourning, Op. 28
- Four Mediaeval Latin Lyrics, Op. 32
  1. Rondel: Tempus Est Iocundum
  2. Plaint: Dum Estas Inchoatur
  3. Pastoral: Ecce, Chorus Virginum
  4. Lament: Planctus
- In Dark Weather, Op. 33
- Five Spenser Sonnets, for tenor and strings, Op. 42 (1935)
- Amoretti: Five Sonnets, Op. 43
- Nocturne, Op. 54
- Three Psalms, Op. 61
  1. O Lord, Rebuke Me Not
  2. The Lord Is My Shepherd
  3. Praise Ye the Lord
- O Excellent Virgin Princess, Op. 77
- Ode To The Queen, for soprano and orchestra, Op. 83 (1953)
  1. Sound Forth, Celestial Organs
  2. Fair As Unshaded Light
  3. Yet Once Again Our Measures Move
- Two Sonnets by William Alabaster, for baritone, viola and piano Op. 87 (1957)
  1. Upon the Crucifix
  2. On the Reed of Our Lord's Passion
- No Swan So Fine, Op. 91
- Cantata Pastorale, Op. 92
- The Jade Mountain, Op. 116
  1. A Night Thought On Terrace Tower
  2. On Hearing Her Play the Harp
  3. An Autumn Night Message
  4. A Song of the Southern River
  5. Farewell To a Japanese Buddhist Priest Bound Homeward
- Salve Regina, Op. 119
- Fly Envious Time, Op. 148

== Publications ==
Rubbra wrote numerous articles during his lifetime, about both his own music and that of others, including Gerald Finzi, Constant Lambert, John Ireland, Paul Hindemith, Ralph Vaughan Williams, Gustav Holst, Benjamin Britten, Johann Sebastian Bach, Alexander Scriabin, Béla Bartók and Dmitri Shostakovich. In the middle of the twentieth century he wrote "Gramophone Notes" for The Month, a Catholic magazine published in England. He also made several speech recordings for the BBC.
