= Cheltenham Festivals =

UK arts and science charity

Coordinates: 51.890°N 2.078°W

Cheltenham Festivals is a registered charity that aims to bring joy, spark curiosity, connect communities, and inspire change year-round with four world-class festivals in jazz, science, music, and literature, and charitable programmes for education, community, and talent development in Cheltenham, Gloucestershire, England.

== History and structure ==
Cheltenham Festivals is responsible for the four festivals, which include two of the country's oldest. The first Music Festival was held in 1945, followed by a Literature Festival in 1949. These were augmented by the first Jazz Festival in 1996, followed by the Science Festival in 2002.

Previously linked with the Cheltenham Borough Council, in 2006 the four festivals set out independently as they collectively became Cheltenham Festivals. As a registered charity, Cheltenham Festivals has its own marketing, education and development teams.

== Festivals ==
=== Jazz ===
Cheltenham Jazz Festival was formed in 1996. It has a close relationship with BBC Radio 2.

Cheltenham's mix of international jazz icons, up-and-coming new artists and unique festival performances has seen them host some of the world's greatest musicians over a Bank Holiday weekend each May. Past performers include Jamie Cullum, Hugh Laurie, Eartha Kitt, Imelda May, Van Morrison, Stephane Grappelli and Ornette Coleman.

Jamie Cullum: "The great thing about Cheltenham Jazz Festival is that it brings together so many genres under the umbrella of jazz… I think it is one of the best Jazz Festivals in the world".

The 2026 festival marked the 30th anniversary of the Cheltenham Jazz Festival. Held from 29 April to 4 May, the festival recorded more than 41,000 ticket sales, making it its highest-selling edition to date.

The 2026 festival also featured free entertainment in the festival village at Montpellier Gardens, with performances taking place at venues across Cheltenham including Parabola Arts Centre, Hotel du Vin, The Wilson, the Brewery Quarter and Parler.

=== Science ===
Cheltenham Science Festival was formed in 2002 and hosts an international science-based talent competition, FameLab, which attracts finalists from over 30 countries and hosts live semi-finals and a final at the Festival. The Science Festival is held in the Cheltenham Town Hall and adjacent gardens, with a tented science village built in Imperial Square.

The festival has many free activities for adults and children, including the Discover Zone in the Town Hall which provides hands-on activities. The education programme includes a series of free Christmas lectures for local schools. Past presenters include Robert Winston, Richard Dawkins, Steve Backshall, Brian Cox, Richard Hammond, Tony Robinson, Jonathon Porritt, Kevin Conrad, Colin Pillinger and Adam Hart-Davis, Peter Higgs and James Watson.

The 2026 festival took place from 2 to 7 June and featured more than 100 events, talks, demonstrations and workshops. The programme explored topics including artificial intelligence, climate change, health and wellbeing, technology and the environment. The festival also introduced free interactive areas including the Arcade, MakerShack and Discover Zone.

=== Music ===
Cheltenham Music Festival was formed in 1945, and is the oldest member of the Festival family in Cheltenham. Events range from free family workshops and young artists' projects, to concerts and the promotion of contemporary composers. The festival uses several venues across the county, including Cheltenham Town Hall, Pittville Pump Room, and cathedrals, abbeys and churches. As well as music, the festival features film, dance, the visual arts and the spoken word.

Artists in previous years include acclaimed violinist and Cheltenham 2014 Artist-in-Residence Nicola Benedetti, Marc-André Hamelin, Craig Ogden, Calefax, the Dante Quartet, Noam Greenberg, Ingrid Fliter, Danjulo Ishizaka, The Pavel Haas Quartet, Allan Clayton, Paul Lewis, Manchester Camerata, the Schubert Ensemble, Ailish Tynan, Gareth Hancock, Alekzandar Madzar, Sir Peter Maxwell Davies, John Potter, Kathryn Tickell, James Gilchrist and Taraf de Haidouks. The artistic director is Alison Balsom.

=== Literature ===
Cheltenham Literature Festival was formed in 1949. It is the longest-running literature festival in the world and is currently sponsored by The Times and The Sunday Times. Taking place over ten days in Cheltenham Town Hall, Imperial Square and Montpellier Gardens, the festival hosts talks, workshops, debates, and other entertaining events. Most of the great names in modern literature have appeared at the festival at some time during its history. The festival attracts the biggest names in culture, politics and sport and annually welcomes The Booker Prize finalists for a special Booker event.

Past guests have included Terry Pratchett, Toni Morrison, Ian Rankin, Kate Adie, Patrick Stewart, Richard Attenborough, Simon Schama, David Starkey, Antony Sher, Michael Parkinson, Terry Jones, Tony Robinson, Sandi Toksvig, Dawn French, Simon Armitage, Clive James, Ruth Rendell, Alexander McCall Smith, Bruce Parry, Ray Mears, Frank Skinner, Janet Street-Porter, Roger Moore, Tony Curtis, John Barrowman, Russell T Davies, Dave Gorman, Charley Boorman, Alexei Sayle, Mark Thomas, J. K. Rowling, Kofi Annan, Salman Rushdie, A. S. Byatt, Benedict Cumberbatch, Steven Moffat, and Jennifer Saunders.

== Education and outreach ==
A broad education and outreach programme is part of the Cheltenham Festivals, delivering bespoke activities that extend the reach of each festival and help to achieve the organisation's aims of developing talent, engaging year-round with schools and the community, and creating unique experiences. In 2017, 25,000 students took part in Cheltenham Festivals' school offer, as well as teachers from 246 schools.

The education and outreach programme comprises festival-specific events and workshops that take place in the run-up to and during the festivals. Alongside these activities, there are the following year-round programmes.

Beyond Words

Beyond Words reaches out from Cheltenham Literature Festival to young people in Gloucestershire who are temporarily unable to access mainstream schooling due to a severe mental or physical illness. Working with the Gloucestershire Hospital Education Service the programme gives these students the opportunity to work with a writer-in-residence. Their work is professionally published in an anthology, and showcased at Cheltenham Literature Festival.

Reading Teachers = Reading Pupils

Reading Teachers = Reading Pupils aims to engender a love of reading in primary school pupils by increasing teachers' enthusiasm for and knowledge of high quality children's literature. Local networks of teachers' reading groups gives them the time and space to share children's literature so that they can use more whole novels in their teaching. As a result, their pupils read more, and standards are raised.

LabLive

LabLive takes highlights from the Cheltenham Science Festival on tour, presenting interactive science activities to Year 8 and 9 students across the UK. The programme aims to engage students with science and demonstrate the benefits of studying mathematics, technology, engineering and science at GCSE.

FameLab Academy

FameLab Academy is a science communication competition for year 9 students in local secondary schools. The students, supported by their teachers, prepare 3-minute presentations to explain a STEM topic in a dynamic and engaging way to a panel of judges whose assessment focuses on content, clarity and charisma. The winner from each school receives a masterclass in communication skills, a work placement in a local STEM company, and entry into the Gloucestershire FameLab final.

Musicate

Musicate aims to inspire a love of music by giving children the skills to engage with unfamiliar genres of music. The programme brings primary school teachers and early career musicians together, and equips them with creative approaches to music education. In collaboration they produce music experiences for children throughout the academic year, and the musicians also have the opportunity to plan and present a bespoke concert for schools at the Cheltenham Jazz and Music Festivals.

== Future strategy ==
In June 2026, Cheltenham Festivals launched The Next Chapter, a five-year strategy covering 2026–2030. The strategy focuses on people, place and collective action, with goals including making 50% of festival activity free by 2030, increasing engagement with residents from economically deprived areas of Cheltenham, and expanding opportunities for young people and underserved communities.
