= Steven Osborne (pianist) =

Scottish pianist

Steven Osborne OBE
- Born: 12 March 1971 (age 55); Scotland
- Education: Royal Northern College of Music, Manchester
- Occupation: Classical pianist
- Spouse: Jean Johnson (clarinettist)
- Website: Stevenosborne.co.uk

Steven George McNeil Osborne OBE (born 12 March 1971) is a Scottish pianist who has performed concertos and solo recitals worldwide.

== Career ==
He was taught by Richard Beauchamp at St Mary's Music School in Edinburgh before going to the Royal Northern College of Music in Manchester to study under Renna Kellaway. After graduating, Osborne went on to win first prize in the Clara Haskil International Piano Competition in Switzerland in 1991 and the Naumburg International Piano Competition in New York in May 1997. In 1999 he was selected as BBC New Generation Artist in the first year of the scheme.

In 2000, he was a soloist with the Naumburg Orchestral Concerts, in the Naumburg Bandshell, Central Park (NY), summer series.

His recording career began when he signed with Hyperion Records in 1998 and has resulted in bi-annual recordings. The first disc with the BBC Scottish Symphony Orchestra acknowledged Osborne's Scottish musical heritage with a pairing of Sir Alexander Mackenzie's Scottish Concerto alongside Sir Donald Tovey's Piano Concerto in A, winning a BBC Music Magazine 'Best of the Year' and a Gramophone 'Critics Choice' award. His subsequent disc was a recording of works by the contemporary Russian composer Nikolai Kapustin – including 13 of his 24 Preludes in Jazz Style – which won a Deutscher Schallplattenpreis. The disc that brought Osborne to international attention was his recording of Olivier Messiaen's epic Vingt regards sur l'enfant-Jésus in 2002. His ongoing contract with Hyperion has resulted in two Gramophone Awards (Britten's Piano Concerto in 2009, Mussorgsky and Prokofiev in 2013), two Schallplattenpreis awards (Rachmaninoff's 24 Preludes and Britten's Complete Works for Piano and Orchestra).

He has performed concertos with orchestras internationally, including the Yomiuri Nippon Symphony Orchestra, Berlin Symphony, Deutsches Symphonie-Orchester Berlin, Salzburg Mozarteum Orchestra, Finnish Radio Symphony Orchestra, Bergen Philharmonic Orchestra, Residentie Orkest, Sydney Symphony Orchestra, Hong Kong Philharmonic Orchestra and the Dallas Symphony Orchestra. With these orchestras he has collaborated with conductors including Christoph von Dohnányi, Alan Gilbert, Vladimir Ashkenazy, Ludovic Morlot, Leif Segerstam, Andrew Litton, Ingo Metzmacher, Vladimir Jurowski and Jukka-Pekka Saraste.

Osborne has returned most years to the BBC Proms – where his programmes have ranged from Mahler's Des Knaben Wunderhorn with Alice Coote (2009), Rachmaninoff's 1st Piano Concerto (2010) with the Ulster Orchestra under Paul Watkins, to Falla's Nights in the Gardens of Spain (2011), Grieg's Piano Concerto with the BBC Philharmonic Orchestra under John Storgårds (2012), and Messiaen's Turangalîla-Symphonie with Valérie Hartmann-Claverie and the BBC Philharmonic Orchestra under Juanjo Mena (2015). At the Edinburgh Festival he has appeared both as a soloist and as a chamber musician performing with his long-term collaborators Christian Tetzlaff, Alban Gerhardt, Paul Lewis and Lisa Batiashvili. In 2015, Osborne was announced as the first patron of Lammermuir Festival.

== Honours and awards ==
In 2014 Osborne was elected a Fellow of the Royal Society of Edinburgh.

He was appointed an Officer of the Order of the British Empire (OBE) in the 2022 New Year Honours for services to music.
