= European Opera Centre =

Opera school associated with youths

- Orchestra
- Founded: 1997
- Principal conductor: Kent Nagano
- Website: www.operaeurope.eu

The European Opera Centre, launched in 1997, is an organization dedicated to the development and promotion of young opera professionals. It provides training, coaching, and performance opportunities for individuals in the field of opera.

== History ==
The European Opera Centre was launched in 1997 with support from the European Parliament and European Commission. Initially located in Manchester, the Centre relocated to Liverpool in 2004. The centre is based at the Liverpool Hope University. Originally it focused on Europe, however, it expanded its opportunities globally in 2015 and have had participants from 77 countries who have engaged in auditions and projects. It is registered as a charity under the United Kingdom law.

== Functions ==
The European Opera Centre was established to address a disadvantage European citizens faced in opera employment due to superior training opportunities outside Europe.The centre operates under the Action Programme for the implementation of a European Community vocational training policy, specifically the Leonardo da Vinci program from 1995-1999.

The center collaborates with various partners across Europe to offer a diverse experience for participants. Its two main aims are "to help people of high potential move from education to employment in opera and to develop audiences for opera".

The European Opera Centre initiated a program for schools in Merseyside. The programme was supported by Liverpool based universities, Liverpool Hope University and Edge Hill University. It was also supported by the Williams Liverpool BMW Group.

The centre held auditions in Malta in 2013. In 2014, the Centre worked in collaboration with Royal Liverpool Philharmonic Orchestra at the St George's Hall, Liverpool.

== Executives ==
The centre was founded by John Manduell.

=== Leadership ===
- Laurent Pillot - Head of singer development and artistic advisor
- Kent Nagano - President
- Vasily Petrenko - Conductor
- Bernard Rozet - Stage director
- Daniel Candillari - Chief repetiteur

=== Governance ===
- Kenneth Baird - Chief executive
- Olga Kolokytha - Project manager
- Sophie Redfern - Curator

=== Trustees ===
- Andrew Thomson
- Fiona Chambers
- Evgenia Chernysheva-Petrenko
- Paul Solon
