= Mark Lythgoe =

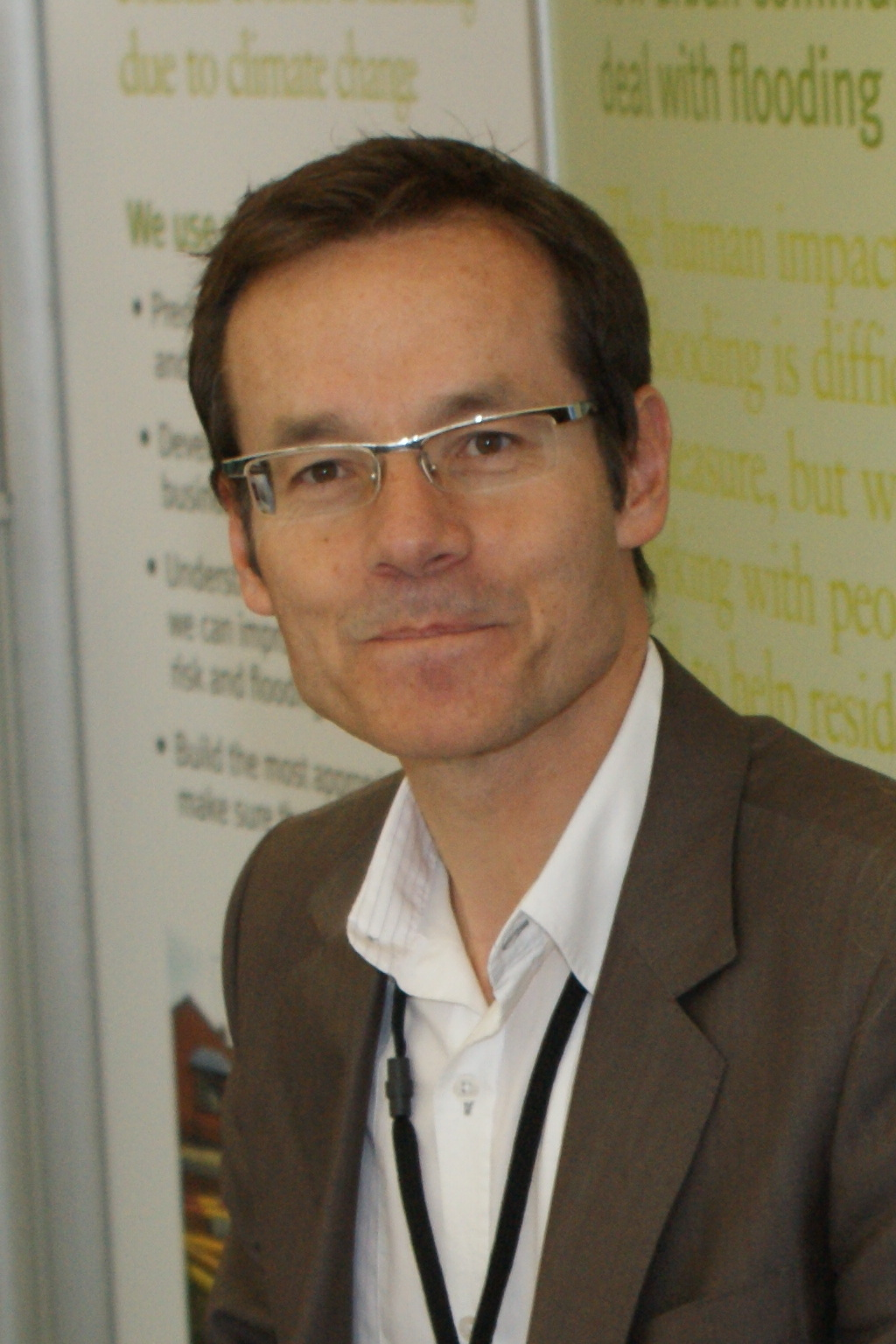
- Director, Cheltenham Science Festival
- Born: Manchester
- Education: University College London
- Title: Professor of Imaging

Mark Lythgoe is Professor of Biomedical Imaging and Founder and Director of the UCL Centre for Advanced Biomedical Imaging, based at University College London (UCL). He has published over 300 papers including publications in Nature, Nature Photonics, Nature Medicine and The Lancet. His ongoing research is centred around a new device that combines both diagnosis and therapy into a single theranostic MRI system. Lythgoe's multidisciplinary approach bridges the domains of healthcare engineering and clinical medicine, yielding multiple imaging breakthroughs and securing £45 million for his collaborative research program. As Director of the UCL Department of Imaging, Lythgoe has played a role in the translation of several new imaging developments into clinical practice

== Early life ==
Lythgoe attended St Augustine's Catholic Grammar School in Wythenshawe, Manchester (became St John Plessington High School), then attended Xaverian College. He earned a master's degree in Behavioural Sciences from the University of Surrey, followed by a PhD in Imaging from University College London.
