= Kathy Sykes =

British physicist

Kathy Sykes OBE FInstP CPhys
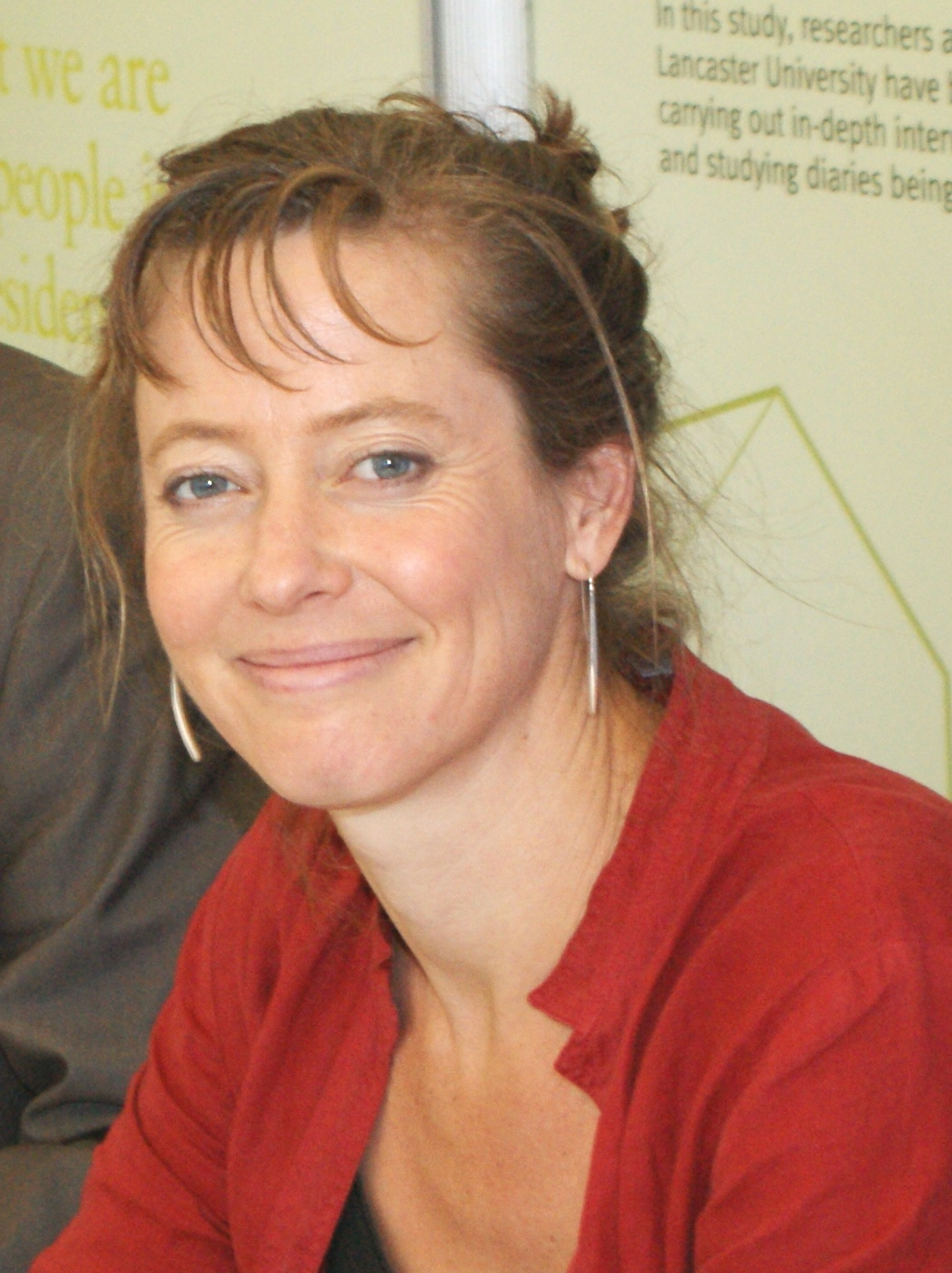
- Sykes at the Cheltenham Science Festival in 2009
- Born: Katharine Ellen Sykes; 20 December 1966 (age 59)
- Education: Fitzharrys School
- Alma mater: University of Bristol (BSc, PhD)
- Known for: Cheltenham Science Festival; NESTA Famelab
- Awards: Kohn Award (2006); Kelvin Prize (2006); Suffrage Science award (2013)
- Scientific career
- Institutions: University of Bristol; At-Bristol Science Centre
- Thesis: Crystallization and degradation of a biodegradable plastic - polyhydroxybutyrate (1996)
- Website: www.bristol.ac.uk/physics/people/kathy-e-sykes

Katharine Ellen Sykes OBE FInstP CPhys (born 20 December 1966) is a British physicist, broadcaster and Professor of Sciences and Society at the University of Bristol. She was previously Collier Professor of Public Engagement in Science and Engineering, from 2002 to 2006. She has presented various BBC2 and Open University TV series, including Rough Science, Ever Wondered about Food, Alternative Therapies. Alternative Medicine and presented for the documentary television miniseries Brave New World with Stephen Hawking in 2011.

== Education ==
Sykes was educated at Fitzharrys School, a co-educational comprehensive school in Abingdon. She went on to study at the University of Bristol where she was awarded a Bachelor of Science degree in Physics in 1989 and a PhD in 1996 for work on the crystallization and degradation of polyhydroxybutyrate, a biodegradable plastic.

== Career ==
Sykes helped to create and co-directs Cheltenham Science Festival and Famelab, a national UK competition which talent spots and trains new faces in science communication. She was Head of Science for Explore-At-Bristol, in charge of the team creating the content for the award-winning Hands-on Science Centre. She is a member of the Council for Science and Technology (CST), the UK government's top-level advisory body on science and technology policy issues. She has also served on advisory panels in public engagement in science for the Royal Society, the Wellcome Trust and Engineering and Physical Sciences Research Council (EPSRC). She is a trustee of NESTA and a board member of Explore-At-Bristol.

=== Awards and honours ===
Sykes won the Kohn Award in 2006 for excellence in engaging the public with science. She holds an honorary Doctor of Science degree and honorary fellowship from the University of Gloucestershire and won the Suffrage Science award in 2013.

Sykes was appointed Order of the British Empire (OBE) in the 2009 Birthday Honours.
