= Symphony No. 1 (Rubbra) =

Symphony by Edmund Rubbra

The Symphony No. 1, op. 44 by Edmund Rubbra was completed in 1937, soon after the Sinfonia Concertante, his first published large-scale orchestral work. It is the first of four closely related symphonies Rubbra wrote in quick succession, between 1935 and 1941. Hugh Ottaway notes that No. 1 was composed in the wake of William Walton's First Symphony and Vaughan Williams' Fourth. Rob Barnett describes it as "characteristic of the turmoil of the 1930s".

The score was published by Universal Edition in 1937 and again by Alfred Lengnick & Co in 1949. The manuscript is in the British Museum. It takes around 35 minutes to perform. There are three movements:

1. Allegro moderato e tempestoso. "A portrait of conflict and vigour".
2. Perigourdine. Allegro bucolico e giocoso. This scherzo is based on an old French tune, 8 bars long, that runs throughout.
3. Lento. A slow-moving, linear piece which ends in a fugue. It is longer than the first two movements put together.

== Reception, performances and recordings ==
The Symphony was premiered in 1937, broadcast from the BBC Concert Hall on 30 April, with the BBC Symphony Orchestra conducted by Adrian Boult. It made a significant initial impression. However, there were few further performances, and the work received some negative criticism. Harold Truscott said that its orchestration was "persistently thick and without relief", and that it demanded "enormous concentration of the listener".

Charles Groves and the Royal Liverpool Philharmonic Orchestra revived it in the 1970s, and there was a BBC broadcast on 29 January 1988 by the BBC Symphony Orchestra, conducted by Simon Joly. It was one of the last of Rubbra's symphonies to receive a commercial recording. The premiere recording was issued by Chandos in 1997, performed by the BBC National Orchestra of Wales, conducted by Richard Hickox.
