= Cheltenham Town Hall =

Historic building in Cheltenham, Gloucestershire, England

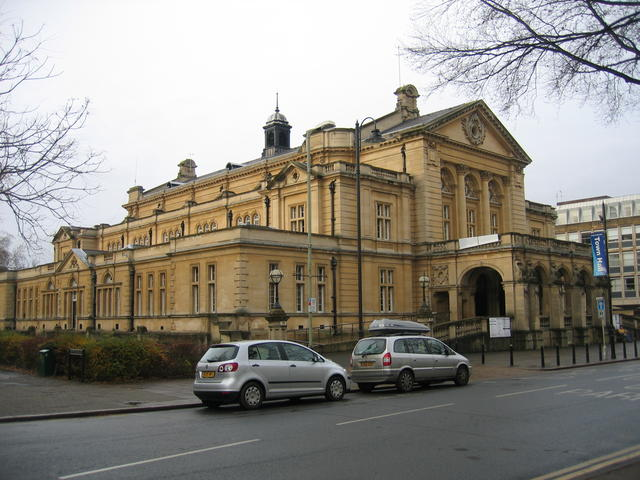
- Cheltenham Town Hall

- Shown in Gloucestershire
- 51.8972°N 2.0778°W
- Location: Cheltenham

History
- Built: 1903; 123 years ago

Site notes
- Architect: Frederick William Waller
- Architectural style: Classical style

Listed Building – Grade II
- Designated: 5 May 1972
- Reference no.: 1104376

Cheltenham Town Hall is an early-20th century assembly room in Cheltenham, England. Unlike most town halls, it is a public venue and not the seat of the borough council, which is housed in the nearby Municipal Offices. It is a Grade II listed building.

== History ==
In the 19th century the old Assembly Rooms in the High Street had been the main public venue for concerts in Cheltenham. The old Assembly Rooms had been demolished to make way for a bank at the turn of the century.

The foundation stone for the building was laid by Alderman Colonel Richard Rogers on 1 October 1902. The building was designed by the Gloucester architect Frederick William Waller in the Classical style and built by the Cheltenham firm of Collins and Godfrey. The total cost of the building, including internal decoration, fixtures and fittings, was around £45,000. It was formally opened on 5 December 1903 by Sir Michael Hicks Beach MP, a former Chancellor of the Exchequer whose family had long-standing connections to Cheltenham.

The design for the main frontage involved a large projecting arcaded Porte-cochère (i.e. gateway for horse-drawn coaches) at ground floor level. It also involved a three-bay frontage with Corinthian order columns between each of the three windows at first floor level with a large pediment above containing an oculus. Inside the building, the main hall, with Corinthian columns and coved ceiling, measures 92 by 52 feet (28 m × 16 m) and is 53 feet (16 m) high, with a capacity of 1,000 people. The Pillar Room serves as a secondary performance area, with a capacity of 300 people; to the left of the entrance hall, the Central Spa dispenses the waters from all the pump rooms of Cheltenham Spa. The octagonal table and urns, which are of Doulton ware, are still in use.

In 1916, two plaster-cast statues of King Edward VII and King George V in coronation robes, made by Messrs R. L. Boulton & Sons of Cheltenham, were placed in alcoves on either side of the main stage. One was a gift from Mr. T. E. Whittaker and the other a gift from Messrs. Boulton themselves. The town hall organ was also a gift, from Mr and Mrs Edward J. Burrow; it was made by Rushworth and Dreaper of Liverpool and was installed in 1928.

When resident with the Royal Corps of Signals at the Moray House Hotel (now the Hotel du Vin) from 1943, Sir Norman Wisdom performed at the hall in Army charity concerts, after one of which actor Rex Harrison came backstage and urged him to turn professional.

One of the episodes from series 35 of the BBC television series the Antiques Roadshow was filmed at the town hall in 2013. It is now used for concerts, banquets, meetings, dances, balls, exhibitions, conferences and as one of the major homes of Cheltenham Festivals. Plans were announced to refurbish the building in March 2017 but they were the put on hold pending further consideration of the different options in July 2018.
