= Cheltenham Borough Council elections =

Local government elections in Gloucestershire, England

Cheltenham Borough Council is the local authority for Cheltenham in Gloucestershire, England. Half the council is elected every two years, while before 2002 the council was elected by thirds. Since the last boundary changes in 2002, 40 councillors have been elected from 20 wards.

== Election results ==
Composition of the council
Year	Conservative	Liberal Democrats (Note: Includes totals for the predecessors of the Liberal Democrats, the Liberal Party and SDP (both of which participated in the Alliance).)	Labour	PAB	Green (Note: Includes totals for the predecessors of the Green Party of England and Wales, the Ecology Party and Green Party UK.)	Reform UK	Independents & Others	Council control after election
Local government reorganisation; council established (35 seats)
1973	21	4	7	–	–	–	3	Conservative
1976	22	4	2	0	0	–	7	Conservative
1979	15	14	0	0	0	–	6	No overall control
New ward boundaries (33 seats)
1983	16	12	1	0	0	–	4	No overall control
1984	12	14	2	0	0	–	5	No overall control
1986	11	16	2	0	0	–	4	No overall control
1987	15	14	2	0	0	–	2	No overall control
1988	16	14	2	0	0	–	1	No overall control
1990	15	15	2	0	0	–	1	No overall control
New ward boundaries (41 seats)
1991	8	24	3	3	0	–	3	Liberal Democrats
1992	12	22	3	2	0	–	2	Liberal Democrats
1994	10	26	2	1	0	–	2	Liberal Democrats
1995	7	29	2	0	0	–	3	Liberal Democrats
1996	3	34	1	1	0	–	2	Liberal Democrats
1998	9	27	0	3	0	–	2	Liberal Democrats
1999	18	17	1	4	0	–	1	No overall control
2000	24	12	2	3		–	0	Conservative
New ward boundaries (40 seats)
2002 (Note: Changed from one-third to half council elections.)	13	21	2	4	0	–	0	Liberal Democrats
2004	15	18	2	5	0	–	0	No overall control
2006	17	17	1	5	0	–	0	No overall control
2008	17	20	0	3	0	–	0	No overall control
2010	12	25	0	3	0	–	0	Liberal Democrats
2012	11	25	0	4	0	–	0	Liberal Democrats
2014	12	24	0	4	0	–	0	Liberal Democrats
2016	7	29	0	3	0	–	1	Liberal Democrats
2018	6	32	0	2	0	–	0	Liberal Democrats
2021	7	31	0	2	0	–	0	Liberal Democrats
2022	6	31	0	2	1	–	0	Liberal Democrats
New ward boundaries (40 seats)
2024	0	36	0	1	3	–	0	Liberal Democrats
2026	0	35	0	1	3	1	0	Liberal Democrats

== Borough result maps ==
2002 results map

2004 results map

2006 results map

2008 results map

2010 results map

2012 results map

2014 results map

2016 results map

2018 results map

2021 results map

2022 results map

2024 results map

2026 results map

== Changes between elections ==
=== 1986–1990 ===
Hesters Way By-Election 20 October 1988
Party	Candidate	Votes	%	±%
Liberal Democrats	Clive Lloyd	1,353	58.4	+10.9
Conservative	Nigel Ball	658	28.4	−5.7
Labour	Ian Whyte	307	13.2	−5.3
Majority		695	30.0	
Turnout		2,318	32.13	
Liberal Democrats hold		Swing		

Lansdown By-Election 8 December 1988
Party	Candidate	Votes	%	±%
Conservative	Roy Miles	895	53.5	−4.4
Liberal Democrats	Mary Gray	694	41.5	+11.1
Labour	Robert Irons	85	5.1	−6.6
Majority		201	12.0	
Turnout		1,674	27.39	
Conservative hold		Swing		

=== 1998–2002 ===
Swindon Village By-Election 28 May 1998
Party	Candidate	Votes	%	±%
PAB	Joanna McVeagh	239	39.6	+0.9
Liberal Democrats	Charmain Sheppard	218	36.2	−13.1
Conservative	Barbara Driver	146	24.2	+12.2
Majority		21	3.4	
Turnout		603	41.7	
PAB gain from Liberal Democrats		Swing		

Prestbury By-Election 2 November 2000
Party	Candidate	Votes	%	±%
PAB	Diane Hibbert	786	59.2	+0.5
Conservative	Tess Neale	344	25.9	+7.5
Liberal Democrats	Robert Jones	161	12.1	+4.2
Labour	Edward Hemmings	37	2.8	+2.8
Majority		625	33.3	
Turnout		1,328	22.0	
PAB gain from Conservative		Swing		

=== 2002–2006 ===
Charlton Kings By-Election 22 January 2004
Party	Candidate	Votes	%	±%
Conservative	Christine Ryder	857	47.0	−3.3
Liberal Democrats	Alan White	833	45.7	+9.1
Green	Caroline Griffiths	84	4.6	−2.2
Labour	Denis Williams	49	2.7	−3.6
Majority		24	1.3	
Turnout		1,823	42.9	
Conservative hold		Swing		

=== 2006–2010 ===
All Saints By-Election 30 July 2009
Party	Candidate	Votes	%	±%
Liberal Democrats	Charlie Stewart	680	58.2	−0.9
Conservative	Emma Logan	395	33.8	+0.2
Green	Cathy Green	59	4.9	+0.4
Labour	John Phipps	37	3.2	+0.3
Majority		285	24.4	
Turnout		1,169	27.1	
Liberal Democrats hold		Swing		

=== 2010–2014 ===
Springbank By-Election 28 October 2010
Party	Candidate	Votes	%	±%
Liberal Democrats	Chris Coleman	722	66.4	−2.9
Conservative	Mireille Weller	188	17.3	−13.4
Labour	Clive Harriss	142	13.1	+13.1
Green	Jon Stubbings	35	3.2	+3.2
Majority		534	49.1	
Turnout		1,087		
Liberal Democrats hold		Swing		

Warden Hill By-Election 2 May 2013
Party	Candidate	Votes	%	±%
Conservative	Chris Ryder	852	53.7	−7.1
Liberal Democrats	Tony Oliver	735	46.3	+24.9
Majority		117	7.5	
Turnout		1,587	37.49	
Conservative gain from Liberal Democrats		Swing		

=== 2014–2018 ===
Battledown By-Election 7 May 2015
Party	Candidate	Votes	%	±%
Conservative	Louis Savage	1,477	47.1	+1.1
Liberal Democrats	Paul McCloskey	1,037	33.0	−8.9
Green	Roberta Smart	243	7.7	N/A
Labour	Helen Pemberton	200	6.4	N/A
UKIP	Elizabeth Roberts	181	5.8	−6.3
Majority		440	14.1	
Turnout		3,138	74	
Conservative hold		Swing		

All Saints By-Election 4 May 2017
Party	Candidate	Votes	%	±%
Liberal Democrats	Alex Hegenbarth	806	51.9	−0.6
Conservative	Ben Carlton	512	33.0	+4.4
Green	Adrian Becker	130	8.4	+1.1
Labour	Joanna Hughes	105	6.8	−4.8
Majority		294	18.9	
Turnout		1,553	38	
Liberal Democrats hold		Swing		

=== 2022–2026 ===
Battledown By-Election 9 February 2023
Party	Candidate	Votes	%	±%
Liberal Democrats	Ed Chidley	877	52.0	+11.2
Conservative	Marcia Mary Jacko	609	36.1	−10.3
Green	Ian Alexander Cameron	156	9.3	−3.5
Labour	Caroline Adele Gavin	43	2.6	N/A
Majority		268	15.9	
Turnout		1,690	35	
Liberal Democrats gain from Conservative		Swing		

Prestbury By-Election 12 October 2023
Party	Candidate	Votes	%	±%
PAB	Stan Smith	644	37.2	−8.5
Green	Jan Foster	484	27.9	+9.6
Liberal Democrats	Ben Ingram	346	20.0	+5.4
Conservative	Laura Kennedy	258	14.9	−6.5
Majority		160	9.2	
Turnout		1,732		
PAB hold		Swing		

Charlton Kings By-Election 1 May 2025
Party	Candidate	Votes	%	±%
Liberal Democrats	Hannah Healy	869	48.2	
Conservative	Matt Babbage	696	38.6	
Green	Karen Celia Wilson	193	10.7	
Labour	Malcolm Bride	46	2.5	
Majority		173	9.6	
Turnout		1,838	41	
Liberal Democrats hold		Swing		
