= 2024 Cheltenham Borough Council election =

Local election in Cheltenham, England

- 2 May 2024

All 40 seats to Cheltenham Borough Council 21 seats needed for a majority

	Majority party	Minority party
Leader	Rowena Hay	Ashleigh Davies
Party	Liberal Democrats	Green
Last election	31	1
Seats before	30	2
Seats after	36	3
Seat change	▲6	▲1
Popular vote	31,202	9,431
Percentage	51.9%	15.7%
Swing	▼3.2%	▲4.4%
	Third party	Fourth party
Leader		Tim Harman
Party	PAB	Conservative
Last election	1	6
Seats before	2	5
Seats after	1	0
Seat change	▼1	▼5
Popular vote	928	15,280
Percentage	1.5%	25.4%
Swing	▼1.3%	▼2.3%
- Winner of each seat at the 2024 Cheltenham Borough Council election
Leader before election
Rowena Hay
Liberal Democrats
Leader after election
Rowena Hay
Liberal Democrats

The 2024 Cheltenham Borough Council election was held on Thursday 2 May 2024, alongside the other local elections in the United Kingdom being held on the same day. All 40 members of Cheltenham Borough Council in Gloucestershire were elected following boundary changes.

The Liberal Democrats retained control of the local authority. The Conservatives were wiped out losing all their seats on the council, with the Greens replacing them as the largest opposition party.

== Background ==
Since its creation in 1974, control of the council has alternated between the Conservatives and Liberal Democrats. The Conservatives controlled the council until 1979, when it fell into no overall control until 1991, when the Liberal Democrats took control. The Conservatives briefly controlled the council from 2000 to 2002, with the Liberal Democrats re-taking control from no overall control in 2010. The Liberal Democrats have formed majority administrations since then.

In the most recent election, the Liberal Democrats maintained their seat count with 55.1% of the vote, the Conservatives won 1 seat (down 1) with 27.7%, People Against Bureaucracy kept their 1-seat up for election with 2.8%, and the Green Party gained 1 seat with 11.3%.

== Boundary changes ==
Cheltenham usually elects its councillors in halves, on a 4-year cycle. However, following boundary changes, all councillors will be elected to the new wards. All wards have 2 councillors.

Old wards	New wards
All Saints	All Saints
Battledown	Battledown
Benhall and the Reddings	Benhall, the Reddings and Fiddler's Green
Charlton Kings	Charlton Kings
Charlton Park	Charlton Park
College	College
Hesters Way	Hesters Way
Lansdown	Lansdown
Leckhampton	Leckhampton
Oakley	Oakley
Park	Park
Pittville	Pittville
Prestbury	Prestbury
Springbank	Springbank
St Mark's	St Mark's
St Paul's	St Paul's
St Peter's	St Peter's
Swindon Village	Swindon Village
Up Hatherley	Up Hatherley
Warden Hill	Warden Hill

== Previous council composition ==
After 2022 election		Before 2024 election		After 2024 election	
Party	Seats	Party	Seats	Party	Seats
Liberal Democrats	31	Liberal Democrats	30	Liberal Democrats	36
Green	1	Green	2	Green	3
PAB	2	PAB	2	PAB	1
Conservative	6	Conservative	5	Conservative	0
Independent	0	Independent	1	Independent	0

Changes:

- June 2022: Wendy Flynn joins Green Party from Liberal Democrats
- October 2022: Sandra Holliday suspended from Liberal Democrats
- December 2022: Louis Savage (Conservative) resigns; by-election held February 2023
- February 2023: Ed Chidley (Liberal Democrats) wins by-election from the Conservatives
- August 2023: John Payne (People Against Bureaucracy) resigns; by-election held October 2023
- October 2023: Stan Smith (People Against Bureaucracy) wins by-election

== Results ==
Cheltenham Borough Council's composition after the 2024 local elections

2024 Cheltenham Borough Council election
Party	This election				Full council			This election		
Party	Candidates	Seats	Net	Seats %	Other	Total	Total %	Votes	Votes %	+/−
Liberal Democrats	{{{candidates}}}	36	▲6	90.0	0	36	90.0	31,202	51.9	–3.2
Green	{{{candidates}}}	3	▲1	7.5	0	3	7.5	9,431	15.7	+4.4
PAB	{{{candidates}}}	1	▼1	2.5	0	1	2.5	928	1.5	–1.3
Conservative	{{{candidates}}}	0	▼5	0.0	0	0	0.0	15,280	25.4	–2.3
Labour	{{{candidates}}}	0	Steady	0.0	0	0	0.0	2,798	4.7	+1.8
Independent	{{{candidates}}}	0	▼1	0.0	0	0	0.0	385	0.6	N/A
TUSC	{{{candidates}}}	0	Steady	0.0	0	0	0.0	109	0.2	+0.2

== Ward results ==
Sitting councillors are marked with an asterisk (*).

=== All Saints ===
All Saints
Party	Candidate	Votes	%	±%
Liberal Democrats	Barbara Ann Clark*	888	56.9	N/A
Liberal Democrats	Izaac Augustus Tailford*	839	53.7	N/A
Conservative	Martin Tracey	361	23.1	N/A
Conservative	Philip Royden Wilce	262	16.8	N/A
Green	Amandeep Kaur Gill-Lang	228	14.6	N/A
Labour	Diana Helen Hale	219	14.0	N/A
Green	Stephen West	196	12.6	N/A
Majority				
Turnout		1,561	34	
Liberal Democrats hold		Swing		
Liberal Democrats hold		Swing		

=== Battledown ===
Battledown
Party	Candidate	Votes	%	±%
Liberal Democrats	Helen Clare Pemberton	811	47.4	N/A
Liberal Democrats	Chris Day	773	45.2	N/A
Conservative	Matt Babbage*	690	40.3	N/A
Conservative	Dan Bunner	530	31.0	N/A
Green	Karen Wilson	189	11.0	N/A
Green	Connor Lewis Auker-Howlett	133	7.8	N/A
Labour	Caroline Adele Gavin	125	7.3	N/A
Majority				
Turnout		1,711	36	
Liberal Democrats gain from Conservative		Swing		
Liberal Democrats gain from Conservative		Swing		

=== Benhall, the Reddings & Fiddler's Green ===
Benhall, the Reddings & Fiddler's Green
Party	Candidate	Votes	%	±%
Liberal Democrats	Michael John David Collins*	1,072	52.8	N/A
Liberal Democrats	Stephen Ian Steinhardt	1,030	50.7	N/A
Conservative	Dan Collins	659	32.4	N/A
Conservative	Alan James Davis	470	23.1	N/A
Green	Sarah Jane Field	253	12.5	N/A
Green	John Leslie Jarvis	149	7.3	N/A
Labour	Jan Lugg	143	7.0	N/A
Majority				
Turnout		2,031	41	
Liberal Democrats hold		Swing		
Liberal Democrats hold		Swing		

=== Charlton Kings ===
Charlton Kings
Party	Candidate	Votes	%	±%
Liberal Democrats	Angie Boyes*	1,099	59.3	N/A
Liberal Democrats	Andy Mutton	840	45.3	N/A
Conservative	Nick Saywell	542	29.2	N/A
Conservative	Roy Hewlett	460	24.8	N/A
Green	Daniel Joseph Willey	242	13.1	N/A
Green	Morgan Woodland	178	9.6	N/A
Labour	Ella Harriet Rees	168	9.1	N/A
Majority				
Turnout		1,854	42	
Liberal Democrats hold		Swing		
Liberal Democrats hold		Swing		

=== Charlton Park ===
Charlton Park
Party	Candidate	Votes	%	±%
Liberal Democrats	Paul Richard Baker*	1,218	62.5	N/A
Liberal Democrats	Steve Harvey*	1,033	53.0	N/A
Conservative	Georgina Rose Bass	526	27.0	N/A
Conservative	Helen Frances Shill	457	23.4	N/A
Green	Melina Pereira Costelloe	151	7.7	N/A
Green	Sharon Lorna Wallington	142	7.3	N/A
Labour	Malcolm Bride	110	5.6	N/A
Independent	John Kadwell	74	3.8	N/A
Majority				
Turnout		1,949	46	
Liberal Democrats hold		Swing		
Liberal Democrats hold		Swing		

=== College ===
College
Party	Candidate	Votes	%	±%
Liberal Democrats	Iain Andrew Paterson Dobie*	882	51.0	N/A
Liberal Democrats	Garth Wallington Barnes*	831	48.1	N/A
Green	Stephen Benjamin Vitkovitch	410	23.7	N/A
Conservative	Bettina Evans	319	18.4	N/A
Conservative	Teresa Anne Prothero	312	18.0	N/A
Green	Lewis Vincent Irvine	277	16.0	N/A
Labour	Adam Moliver	183	10.6	N/A
Majority				
Turnout		1,729	41	
Liberal Democrats hold		Swing		
Liberal Democrats hold		Swing		

=== Hesters Way ===
Hesters Way
Party	Candidate	Votes	%	±%
Liberal Democrats	Simon Wheeler*	396	41.5	N/A
Liberal Democrats	Cathal Lynch	348	36.4	N/A
Green	Wendy Flynn*	280	29.3	N/A
Green	Gary Clarke	237	24.8	N/A
Labour	Clive Harriss	149	15.6	N/A
Conservative	Ro Baillie	147	15.4	N/A
Conservative	Helen Landau	125	13.1	N/A
TUSC	Joe Waters	30	3.1	N/A
TUSC	Samuel Coxson	27	2.8	N/A
Majority				
Turnout		955	19	
Liberal Democrats hold		Swing		
Liberal Democrats hold		Swing		

=== Lansdown ===
Lansdown
Party	Candidate	Votes	%	±%
Liberal Democrats	Glenn Andrews*	713	45.3	N/A
Liberal Democrats	Ben Lewis Orme	585	37.2	N/A
Conservative	Susan Godwin	520	33.0	N/A
Conservative	Olalekan Ebenezer Olajide	391	24.8	N/A
Green	Deborah Claire Milner	204	13.0	N/A
Green	Stephen Paul Bell	190	12.1	N/A
Labour	David Richard Cockfield	169	10.7	N/A
Independent	Geoff Parsons	147	9.3	N/A
Majority				
Turnout		1,574	33	
Liberal Democrats hold		Swing		
Liberal Democrats gain from Conservative		Swing		

=== Leckhampton ===
Leckhampton
Party	Candidate	Votes	%	±%
Liberal Democrats	Martin Charles Horwood*	1,169	54.9	N/A
Liberal Democrats	Julia Caroline Chandler	1,007	47.3	N/A
Conservative	Pippa Mason	655	30.7	N/A
Conservative	William Bernard Francis Prothero	520	24.4	N/A
Green	Peter Robert Frings	235	11.0	N/A
Green	Elizabeth Johnson	215	10.1	N/A
Labour	Bronwen Rachel Goring	125	5.9	N/A
Independent	Sali Wijesinghe	58	2.7	N/A
Majority				
Turnout		2,131	50	
Liberal Democrats hold		Swing		
Liberal Democrats gain from Conservative		Swing		

=== Oakley ===
Oakley
Party	Candidate	Votes	%	±%
Liberal Democrats	Rowena Mary Hay*	626	59.5	N/A
Liberal Democrats	Alisha Chloe-Marie Lewis**	492	46.8	N/A
Conservative	Margaret Emma Frances Nelson**	237	22.5	N/A
Conservative	Andrew Stephen Wall	196	18.6	N/A
Labour	Isobel Mary Laing	150	14.3	N/A
Green	Claire Angela Blanche Spanner	133	12.6	N/A
Green	Nathan Luke Weller	84	8.0	N/A
Majority				
Turnout		1,052	24	
Liberal Democrats hold		Swing		
Liberal Democrats hold		Swing		

Alisha Lewis was a sitting councillor for St Paul's ward

Emma Nelson was a sitting councillor for Leckhampton ward

=== Park ===
Park
Party	Candidate	Votes	%	±%
Liberal Democrats	Jackie Chelin*	942	47.1	N/A
Liberal Democrats	Dilys Mary Juliet Barrell	935	46.8	N/A
Conservative	Tim Harman*	772	38.6	N/A
Conservative	Diana Pollock	580	29.0	N/A
Green	Paul Michael Godfrey	196	9.8	N/A
Labour	Kevin Michael Boyle	160	8.0	N/A
Green	Tussie Myerson	157	7.9	N/A
Majority				
Turnout		1,998	44	
Liberal Democrats hold		Swing		
Liberal Democrats gain from Conservative		Swing		

=== Pittville ===
Pittville
Party	Candidate	Votes	%	±%
Liberal Democrats	Julian Charles George Tooke*	982	54.9	N/A
Liberal Democrats	Juan Carlos Garcia Clamp	796	44.5	N/A
Conservative	Laura Kennedy	463	25.9	N/A
Conservative	Peter Frantz Vagh Christensen	446	24.9	N/A
Green	Sarah Louise Quekett	247	13.8	N/A
Green	Daniel Wilson	227	12.7	N/A
Labour	Martin William Glozier	160	8.9	N/A
Majority				
Turnout		1,790	36	
Liberal Democrats hold		Swing		
Liberal Democrats gain from Conservative		Swing		

=== Prestbury ===
Prestbury
Party	Candidate	Votes	%	±%
PAB	Stan Smith*	928	46.8	N/A
Green	Jan Foster	744	37.6	N/A
Green	Ian Alexander Cameron	644	32.5	N/A
Conservative	Stephan Alexander Fifield*	621	31.3	N/A
Liberal Democrats	Jane Elizabeth Martin	247	12.5	N/A
Conservative	Harry Hopkins	244	12.3	N/A
Liberal Democrats	Joe March	169	8.5	N/A
Majority				
Turnout		1,981	41	
PAB hold		Swing		
Green gain from PAB		Swing		

Stephan Fifield was a sitting councillor for Pittville ward

=== Springbank ===
Springbank
Party	Candidate	Votes	%	±%
Liberal Democrats	Suzanne Theresa Williams*	744	65.7	N/A
Liberal Democrats	Peter Jeremy Jeffries*	734	64.8	N/A
Conservative	James Alan Robert Bass	217	19.2	N/A
Conservative	Roger Graham Fox	197	17.4	N/A
Green	Stephen John Bear	118	10.4	N/A
Green	Ian James Munday	104	9.2	N/A
Majority				
Turnout		1,133	24	
Liberal Democrats hold		Swing		
Liberal Democrats hold		Swing		

=== St Mark's ===
St Mark's
Party	Candidate	Votes	%	±%
Liberal Democrats	Sandra Jane Holliday*	720	53.4	N/A
Liberal Democrats	Richard James Pinegar*	697	51.7	N/A
Conservative	Louise Collins	268	19.9	N/A
Conservative	Penny Hyams	223	16.5	N/A
Labour	Julie Frances Farmer	222	16.5	N/A
Green	Naomi Ruth Seadon	173	12.8	N/A
Green	Adrian Becker	159	11.8	N/A
Majority				
Turnout		1,348	28	
Liberal Democrats hold		Swing		
Liberal Democrats hold		Swing		

=== St Paul's ===
St Paul's
Party	Candidate	Votes	%	±%
Green	Tabi Joy*	501	43.5	N/A
Green	Ashleigh Olivia Davies	455	39.5	N/A
Liberal Democrats	Rob Nancekivell	318	27.6	N/A
Liberal Democrats	Jayjay Potter-Peachy	286	24.8	N/A
Labour	Bobby Johnstone	228	19.8	N/A
Conservative	Chris Mason	124	10.8	N/A
Independent	Daud McDonald	106	9.2	N/A
Conservative	Lily Hannah May Prothero	91	7.9	N/A
TUSC	Adrienne Davis	27	2.3	N/A
TUSC	Christian David Dwyer	25	2.2	N/A
Majority				
Turnout		1,151	25	
Green hold		Swing		
Green gain from Liberal Democrats		Swing		

=== St Peter's ===
St Peter's
Party	Candidate	Votes	%	±%
Liberal Democrats	Victoria May Atherstone*	781	55.6	N/A
Liberal Democrats	David John Willingham*	744	53.0	N/A
Conservative	Jerry Forrest	226	16.1	N/A
Labour	Mike Farmer	224	15.9	N/A
Green	Daniel Ethan Hodges	217	15.4	N/A
Green	Glyn Ellis	191	13.6	N/A
Conservative	Edward Wadih Hazzan	182	13.0	N/A
Majority				
Turnout		1,405	28	
Liberal Democrats hold		Swing		
Liberal Democrats hold		Swing		

=== Swindon Village ===
Swindon Village
Party	Candidate	Votes	%	±%
Liberal Democrats	Flo Clucas*	723	59.7	N/A
Liberal Democrats	Frank John Allen	613	50.6	N/A
Green	Mark Barber	303	25.0	N/A
Green	Edward Nuan Bycroft Saul	257	21.2	N/A
Conservative	Brian Anthony Chaplin	191	15.8	N/A
Conservative	Joseph James Picknell	165	13.6	N/A
Majority				
Turnout		1,212	32	
Liberal Democrats hold		Swing		
Liberal Democrats hold		Swing		

=== Up Hatherley ===
Up Hatherley
Party	Candidate	Votes	%	±%
Liberal Democrats	Adrian Stephen Bamford*	1,170	60.7	N/A
Liberal Democrats	Julie Margaret Sankey*	1,001	51.9	N/A
Conservative	Colin John Parsons	488	25.3	N/A
Conservative	Sandra Gloria Parsons	454	23.5	N/A
Green	Samantha Diane Hodges	222	11.5	N/A
Labour	Philip Cole	156	8.1	N/A
Green	Charles Adrian Goodwin	142	7.4	N/A
Majority				
Turnout		1,929	39	
Liberal Democrats hold		Swing		
Liberal Democrats hold		Swing		

=== Warden Hill ===
Warden Hill
Party	Candidate	Votes	%	±%
Liberal Democrats	Graham Anthony Beale*	1,009	56.5	N/A
Liberal Democrats	Tony Oliver*	939	52.6	N/A
Conservative	Patrick John William Dunleavy	517	29.0	N/A
Conservative	Gill Hewlett	432	24.2	N/A
Green	Maxine Karen Godfrey	139	7.8	N/A
Green	Timothy Cosmo Bonsor	109	6.1	N/A
Labour	Christopher John Meehan	107	6.0	N/A
Majority				
Turnout		1,785	41	
Liberal Democrats hold		Swing		
Liberal Democrats hold		Swing		

== By-elections ==
=== Charlton Kings ===
Charlton Kings: 1 May 2025
Party	Candidate	Votes	%	±%
Liberal Democrats	Hannah Healy	869	48.2	+2.9
Conservative	Matt Babbage	696	38.6	+9.4
Green	Karen Wilson	193	10.7	−2.4
Labour	Malcolm Bride	46	2.5	−6.6
Majority		173	9.6	
Turnout		1,838	41	
Liberal Democrats hold		Swing		
