= 1998 Cheltenham Borough Council election =

1998 UK local government election

The 1998 Cheltenham Council election took place on 7 May 1998 to elect members of Cheltenham Borough Council in Gloucestershire, England. One third of the council was up for election and the Liberal Democrats stayed in overall control of the council.

After the election, the composition of the council was

- Liberal Democrat 27
- Conservative 9
- People Against Bureaucracy 4
- Vacant 1

== Campaign ==
Before the election the Liberal Democrats held 32 of the 41 seats on the council and were guaranteed to remain in control of the council with only 13 seats being contested. They were defending most of the seats up for election, while another 3 were held by the People Against Bureaucracy Action Group. These 3 seats included 2 where Liberal Democrats councillors had defected to People Against Bureaucracy. Meanwhile, the Liberal Democrat leader of the council, Alistair Cameron, stood down at the election.

The campaign saw the Conservatives attack the Liberal Democrats for the level of council tax in Cheltenham and for wasting money.

== Election result ==
Cheltenham local election result 1998
Party	Seats	Gains	Losses	Net gain/loss	Seats %	Votes %	Votes	+/−
Conservative	6	6	0	+6	46.2	40.6	10,387	+8.3
Liberal Democrats	5	0	7	-7	38.5	38.8	9,935	-8.8
PAB	2	1	0	+1	15.4	10.1	2,578	+4.0
Labour	0	0	0	0	0	10.2	2,611	-3.8
Green	0			0	0	0.3	82	N/A

== Ward results ==
All Saints
Party	Candidate	Votes	%	±%
Conservative	Daphne Pennell	807	40.4	+4.5
Liberal Democrats	Patricia Henry	619	31.0	−19.8
PAB	Sally Stringer*	371	18.6	N/A
Labour	Edward Hemmings	200	10.0	−3.3
Majority		188	9.4	
Turnout		1,997	30.2	
Conservative gain from Liberal Democrats		Swing		

Charlton Kings
Party	Candidate	Votes	%	±%
Conservative	Jennifer Moreton	1,439	55.5	+8.4
Liberal Democrats	Claire Grainger	1,153	44.5	−1.5
Majority		286	11.0	
Turnout		2,592	41.2	
Conservative gain from Liberal Democrats		Swing		

College
Party	Candidate	Votes	%	±%
Conservative	Leslie Freeman	1,278	43.3	±0.0
Liberal Democrats	Garth Barnes*	1,225	41.5	−8.0
PAB	Alan Stone	321	10.9	N/A
Labour	Thomas Wiffen	128	4.3	−2.9
Majority		53	1.8	
Turnout		2,952	44.1	
Conservative gain from Liberal Democrats		Swing		

Hatherley & the Reddings
Party	Candidate	Votes	%	±%
Liberal Democrats	Diane Blackburn	1,076	43.2	−6.6
Conservative	Paul Simons	1,036	41.6	+1.2
Labour	Christopher Bailey	298	12.0	+2.2
Green	Geoffrey Foster	82	3.3	N/A
Majority		40	1.6	
Turnout		2,492	32.7	
Liberal Democrats hold		Swing		

Hesters Way
Party	Candidate	Votes	%	±%
Liberal Democrats	Clive Lloyd	865	59.9	−9.4
Conservative	Eric Baylis	305	21.1	+6.9
Labour	William Fawcett	273	18.9	+2.3
Majority		560	38.8	
Turnout		1,443	20.3	
Liberal Democrats hold		Swing		

Lansdown
Party	Candidate	Votes	%	±%
Conservative	Susan Starling	882	51.6	+10.4
Liberal Democrats	Elizabeth Whalley*	644	37.7	−7.5
Labour	Robert Irons	184	10.8	−3.4
Majority		238	13.9	
Turnout		1,710	28.0	
Conservative gain from Liberal Democrats		Swing		

Leckhampton with Up Hatherley
Party	Candidate	Votes	%	±%
Conservative	Robin Macdonald	1,449	57.9	+23.1
Liberal Democrats	Anne Regan*	806	32.2	+1.9
Labour	Martin Burford	249	9.9	+0.3
Majority		643	25.7	
Turnout		2,504	38.1	
Conservative gain from Liberal Democrats		Swing		

Park
Party	Candidate	Votes	%	±%
Conservative	Duncan Smith	1,372	62.9	+13.8
Liberal Democrats	Yvonne Nicholls	810	37.1	−7.2
Majority		562	25.8	
Turnout		2,182	38.6	
Conservative gain from Liberal Democrats		Swing		

Pittville
Party	Candidate	Votes	%	±%
PAB	David Prince*	733	33.4	N/A
Liberal Democrats	Royston Hyett	590	26.9	−20.1
Labour	David Addison	555	25.3	−12.6
Conservative	Nigel Regnier	315	14.4	−0.7
Majority		143	6.5	
Turnout		2,193	38.1	
PAB gain from Liberal Democrats		Swing		

Prestbury
Party	Candidate	Votes	%	±%
PAB	Leslie Godwin*	1,153	59.9	+10.1
Conservative	John Walker	504	26.2	+3.3
Liberal Democrats	Jennifer Jones	202	10.5	−8.4
Labour	Philip Greening	66	3.4	−5.0
Majority		649	33.7	
Turnout		1,925	31.8	
PAB hold		Swing		

St Marks
Party	Candidate	Votes	%	±%
Liberal Democrats	Brian Cassin	650	62.2	−9.3
Labour	Andre Curtis	205	19.6	+3.3
Conservative	James Stevenson	190	18.2	+6.0
Majority		445	42.6	
Turnout		1,045	21.2	
Liberal Democrats hold		Swing		

St Pauls
Party	Candidate	Votes	%	±%
Liberal Democrats	Heather McLain	640	47.9	−13.5
Conservative	Susan Godwin	513	38.4	+18.8
Labour	Tristan Wood	183	13.7	−5.3
Majority		127	9.5	
Turnout		1,336	22.3	
Liberal Democrats hold		Swing		

St Peters
Party	Candidate	Votes	%	±%
Liberal Democrats	Pat Thornton*	655	53.6	−7.0
Conservative	Rachel Murray	297	24.3	+10.0
Labour	Clive Harriss	270	22.1	−3.0
Majority		358	29.3	
Turnout		1,222	20.4	
Liberal Democrats hold		Swing		
