= 2004 Cheltenham Borough Council election =

2004 UK local government election

Results of the 2004 Cheltenham Borough Council election

The 2004 Cheltenham Council election took place on 10 June 2004 to elect members of Cheltenham Borough Council in Gloucestershire, England. Half of the council was up for election and the Liberal Democrats lost overall control of the council to no overall control.

After the election, the composition of the council was

- Liberal Democrat: 18
- Conservative: 15
- People Against Bureaucracy: 5
- Labour: 2

== Election result ==
Overall turnout in the election was 39.44%.

Cheltenham local election result 2004
Party	Seats	Gains	Losses	Net gain/loss	Seats %	Votes %	Votes	+/−
Conservative	9	2	0	+2	45.0	43.5	14,485	+2.6%
Liberal Democrats	7	0	3	-3	35.0	34.5	11,481	-9.8%
PAB	3	1	0	+1	15.0	9.7	3,226	+0.8%
Labour	1	0	0	0	5.0	8.5	2,817	+3.5%
Green	0	0	0	0	0	2.3	777	+1.3%
Independent	0	0	0	0	0	1.4	479	+1.4%

== Ward results ==
All Saints
Party	Candidate	Votes	%	±%
Liberal Democrats	Stephen Jordan*	636	44.3	−13.6
Conservative	Antony Sygerycz	489	34.1	+0.6
Green	Russell Partridge	183	12.7	N/A
Labour	Martin Ricketts	128	8.9	+0.5
Majority		147	10.2	−14.2
Turnout		1,436	34.6	+0.9
Liberal Democrats hold		Swing		

Battledown
Party	Candidate	Votes	%	±%
Conservative	Andrew Wall	1,035	60.9	+14.4
Liberal Democrats	John Coleman	523	30.8	−15.1
Labour	Catherine Mozley	142	8.4	+2.1
Majority		512	30.1	+29.5
Turnout		1,700	48.3	+5.7
Conservative hold		Swing		

Benhall and Reddings
Party	Candidate	Votes	%	±%
Conservative	Jacqueline Fletcher	1,034	53.4	+8.1
Liberal Democrats	Russell Milton	780	40.3	−11.0
Labour	Richard Moody	121	6.3	N/A
Majority		254	13.1	+7.1
Turnout		1,935	48.1	+2.4
Conservative gain from Liberal Democrats		Swing		

Charlton Kings
Party	Candidate	Votes	%	±%
Conservative	Duncan Smith*	1,166	55.8	+5.0
Liberal Democrats	Stephen Harvey	729	34.9	−5.3
Labour	Neville Mozeley	196	9.4	+2.5
Majority		437	20.9	+10.3
Turnout		2,091	49.6	+8.0
Conservative hold		Swing		

Charlton Park
Party	Candidate	Votes	%	±%
Conservative	Leslie Freeman	1,284	64.0	+3.7
Liberal Democrats	Margaret Woodward	583	29.1	−1.7
Labour	David Addison	138	6.9	+1.8
Majority		701	35.0	+5.5
Turnout		2,005	49.6	+3.2
Conservative hold		Swing		

College
Party	Candidate	Votes	%	±%
Liberal Democrats	Lloyd Surgenor*	841	46.7	−1.4
Conservative	Penelope Hall	684	38.0	−3.0
Green	Celia Wyndham	177	9.8	+2.0
Labour	Gillian Howells	100	5.5	−0.1
Majority		157	8.7	+1.6
Turnout		1,802	41.9	+4.3
Liberal Democrats hold		Swing		

Hesters Way
Party	Candidate	Votes	%	±%
Liberal Democrats	Wendy Young*	556	44.1	−20.1
Independent	David Banyard	365	28.9	N/A
Conservative	Daphne Allen	235	18.6	−1.9
Labour	Brenda Moody	105	8.3	−6.1
Majority		191	15.1	−28.6
Turnout		1,261	29.2	+6.2
Liberal Democrats hold		Swing		

Lansdown
Party	Candidate	Votes	%	±%
Conservative	Diggory Seacome*	837	61.1	−0.2
Liberal Democrats	Michael Storm	326	23.8	−0.6
Green	Keith Bessant	105	7.7	−4.1
Labour	David Evans	103	7.5	+0.1
Majority		511	37.3	+0.4
Turnout		1,371	33.1	+3.1
Conservative hold		Swing		

Leckhampton
Party	Candidate	Votes	%	±%
Conservative	Robin MacDonald*	1,466	70.3	+16.4
Liberal Democrats	Dermot Clarke	500	24.0	−20.6
Labour	Frank Bench	118	5.7	N/A
Majority		966	46.4	+37.1
Turnout		2,084	52.2	−2.8
Conservative hold		Swing		

Oakley
Party	Candidate	Votes	%	±%
Labour	Diana Hale*	502	38.0	−16.1
Liberal Democrats	Paul Wheeldon	492	37.2	+13.6
Conservative	Stuart Hutton	327	24.8	+7.4
Majority		10	0.8	−29.7
Turnout		1,321	32.6	+6.2
Labour hold		Swing		

Park
Party	Candidate	Votes	%	±%
Conservative	Gerald Gearing*	1,199	59.1	+5.4
Liberal Democrats	Iain Dobie	660	32.5	−9.5
Labour	Brian Hughes	169	8.3	N/A
Majority		539	26.6	+14.9
Turnout		2,028	44.0	+4.0
Conservative hold		Swing		

Pittville
Party	Candidate	Votes	%	±%
PAB	David Prince*	889	48.1	+5.2
Conservative	Gary Bowden	576	31.1	−2.9
Liberal Democrats	David Lawrence	268	14.5	−1.4
Green	Jennifer Stone	117	6.3	N/A
Majority		313	16.9	+8.0
Turnout		1,850	43.9	+3.4
PAB hold		Swing		

Prestbury
Party	Candidate	Votes	%	±%
PAB	Malcolm Stennett*	1,137	54.4	−8.3
Conservative	John Newman	593	28.4	+2.3
Liberal Democrats	Jennifer Jones	166	7.9	−2.9
Labour	Jonquil Naish	104	5.0	N/A
Green	Joan Mate	89	4.3	−0.7
Majority		544	26.0	−10.6
Turnout		2,089	45.6	+4.9
PAB hold		Swing		

Springbank
Party	Candidate	Votes	%	±%
Liberal Democrats	Simon Wheeler*	566	53.6	−4.9
Conservative	Sarah Baylis	360	34.1	+13.1
Labour	Tustin Kelvin	129	12.2	−3.9
Majority		206	19.5	−18.2
Turnout		1,055	24.3	+2.4
Liberal Democrats hold		Swing		

St Marks
Party	Candidate	Votes	%	±%
Liberal Democrats	John Webster	657	46.6	−14.5
Conservative	Anthony Towers	504	35.7	+9.3
Labour	Clive Harriss	250	17.7	+4.0
Majority		153	10.8	−23.9
Turnout		1,411	32.0	+6.0
Liberal Democrats hold		Swing		

St Pauls
Party	Candidate	Votes	%	±%
Liberal Democrats	Christopher Coleman*	557	63.6	+4.1
Conservative	Susan Godwin	146	16.7	+2.7
Green	Caroline Griffiths	106	12.1	+2.7
PAB	Joanna McVeagh	67	7.6	N/A
Majority		411	46.9	+1.4
Turnout		876	21.4	+4.5
Liberal Democrats hold		Swing		

St Peters
Party	Candidate	Votes	%	±%
Liberal Democrats	John Rawson	596	44.8	−0.1
Conservative	Klara Sudbury	484	36.4	−5.0
Labour	Robert Irons	137	10.3	−4.5
Independent	Stephen Garbutt	114	8.6	N/A
Majority		112	8.4	+4.9
Turnout		1,331	30.4	+6.6
Liberal Democrats hold		Swing		

Swindon Village
Party	Candidate	Votes	%	±%
PAB	Peter Allen	672	41.5	+2.9
Liberal Democrats	Robert Jones*	613	37.9	−9.7
Conservative	Michael Horton	247	15.3	+3.2
Labour	Ann Lightfoot	87	5.4	N/A
Majority		59	3.6	−3.3
Turnout		1,619	36.6	+3.5
PAB gain from Liberal Democrats		Swing		

Up Hatherley
Party	Candidate	Votes	%	±%
Conservative	Alan Nicholson	641	35.0	+1.9
Liberal Democrats	David Fidgeon*	612	33.4	−22.9
PAB	Martin Burford	461	25.2	N/A
Labour	Brian Johnson	117	6.4	N/A
Majority		29	1.6	−14.9
Turnout		1,831	44.1	+1.5
Conservative gain from Liberal Democrats		Swing		

Warden Hill
Party	Candidate	Votes	%	±%
Conservative	Anne Regan*	1,178	54.3	+7.8
Liberal Democrats	Roger Whyborn	820	37.8	−6.3
Labour	Christopher Bailey	171	7.9	−0.7
Majority		358	16.5	+14.8
Turnout		2,169	50.0	+4.7
Conservative hold		Swing		
