= 2012 Cheltenham Borough Council election =

2012 UK local government election

Results of the 2012 Cheltenham Borough Council election

The 2012 Cheltenham Council election took place on 3 May 2012 to elect members of Cheltenham Borough Council in Gloucestershire, England. Half of the council was up for election and the Liberal Democrats stayed in overall control of the council.

After the election, the composition of the council was

- Liberal Democrat 25
- Conservative 11
- People Against Bureaucracy 4

== Election result ==
The result of the election saw the Liberal Democrats retain control of the council with no change in the number of seats they held. The Conservatives lost one seat whilst the People Against Bureaucracy group gained one.

The election saw an error by the poll clerk at St Christopher's Church polling station in Warden Hill, where voters' unique numbers were written on the reverse of ballot papers, 412 votes had to be discounted by the returning officer. Following an investigation, it was found the error did not affect the result so the election was not re-run.

Cheltenham Borough Council Election Result 2012
Party	Seats	Gains	Losses	Net gain/loss	Seats %	Votes %	Votes	+/−
Liberal Democrats	11	1	0	+1	55.0	43.0	11,739	-8.1
Conservative	7	0	2	-2	35.0	36.4	9,937	-2.1
PAB	2	1	0	+1	10.0	7.1	1,952	+2.7
Green	0	0	0	0	0	5.4	1,483	+1.8
Labour	0	0	0	0	0	4.6	1,254	+2.3
UKIP	0	0	0	0	0	3.5	950	N/A

== Ward results ==
All Saints
Party	Candidate	Votes	%	±%
Liberal Democrats	Stephen Jordan*	529	42.7	−9.7
Conservative	Matthew Babbage	476	38.4	+3.8
Labour	Diana Hale	119	9.6	+2.6
Green	Catherine Green	115	9.3	+3.3
Majority		53	4.3	−13.5
Turnout		1,239	31	−33
Liberal Democrats hold		Swing		

Battledown
Party	Candidate	Votes	%	±%
Conservative	Andrew Wall*	771	55.5	+3.4
Liberal Democrats	Paul McCloskey	414	29.8	−18.1
Green	Jon Stubbings	204	14.7	N/A
Majority		357	25.7	+21.5
Turnout		1,389	33	−41
Conservative hold		Swing		

Benhall and The Reddings
Party	Candidate	Votes	%	±%
Conservative	Jacqueline Fletcher*	809	46.8	+6.7
Liberal Democrats	Marcus Annfield	635	36.7	−18.2
UKIP	Peter Bowman	284	16.4	N/A
Majority		174	10.1	−4.7
Turnout		1,728	42	−34
Conservative hold		Swing		

Charlton Kings
Party	Candidate	Votes	%	±%
Liberal Democrats	Rob Reid	854	46.4	−1.4
Conservative	Heather McLain**	768	41.8	−3.8
Green	Sarah Field	217	11.8	+5.2
Majority		86	4.6	+2.2
Turnout		1,925	42	−37
Liberal Democrats gain from Conservative		Swing		

Charlton Park
Party	Candidate	Votes	%	±%
Conservative	Duncan Smith**	898	53.1	+1.1
Liberal Democrats	Paul Baker	794	46.9	−1.1
Majority		104	6.2	+2.1
Turnout		1,692	42	−36
Conservative hold		Swing		

Duncan Smith was a sitting councillor for Charlton Kings.

College
Party	Candidate	Votes	%	±%
Liberal Democrats	Klara Sudbury**	864	62.0	+7.7
Conservative	David Richardson	529	38.0	−0.4
Majority		335	24.0	+8.0
Turnout		1,393	34	−36
Liberal Democrats hold		Swing		

Klara Sudbury was a sitting councillor for Charlton Park.

Hesters Way
Party	Candidate	Votes	%	±%
Liberal Democrats	Wendy Flynn*	623	59.3	−8.8
Conservative	Philip Woolley	237	22.5	−9.4
Labour	Brian Hughes	191	18.2	N/A
Majority		386	36.8	+0.7
Turnout		1,051	21	−31
Liberal Democrats hold		Swing		

Lansdown
Party	Candidate	Votes	%	±%
Conservative	Diggory Seacome*	569	52.1	+2.6
Liberal Democrats	Paula Baldwin	524	47.9	+4.8
Majority		45	4.2	−2.2
Turnout		1,093	26	−34
Conservative hold		Swing		

Leckhampton
Party	Candidate	Votes	%	±%
Conservative	Andrew Chard	761	43.4	−1.4
Liberal Democrats	Elizabeth Pimley	678	38.7	−10.1
UKIP	Alan Stone	172	9.8	N/A
Green	Timothy Bonsor	141	8.0	+1.6
Majority		83	4.7	+0.7
Turnout		1,752	42	−39
Conservative hold		Swing		

Oakley
Party	Candidate	Votes	%	±%
Liberal Democrats	Rowena Hay*	593	54.9	+8.0
Labour	Kevin Boyle	225	20.8	+7.9
Conservative	Mireille Weller	186	17.2	−11.2
Green	Adrian Becker	76	7.0	N/A
Majority		368	34.1	+15.6
Turnout		1,080	25	−29
Liberal Democrats hold		Swing		

Park
Party	Candidate	Votes	%	±%
Conservative	Tim Harman	972	55.8	+4.8
Liberal Democrats	Owen Compton	382	21.9	−20.3
Green	Vanessa Angelo-Thompson	230	13.2	+6.4
UKIP	Ann Coleman	158	9.1	N/A
Majority		590	33.9	+25.1
Turnout		1,742	34	−38
Conservative hold		Swing		

Pittville
Party	Candidate	Votes	%	±%
PAB	David Prince	713	46.1	+13.2
Conservative	Lewis Feilder	397	25.7	−3.5
Liberal Democrats	Chris Ward	280	18.1	−14.6
Green	Ian Lander	96	6.2	+1.1
UKIP	Eric Atkinson	61	3.9	N/A
Majority		316	20.4	+20.2
Turnout		1,547	37	−32
PAB gain from Conservative		Swing		

Prestbury
Party	Candidate	Votes	%	±%
PAB	Malcolm Stennett*	1,239	72.0	+19.0
Conservative	Nathan Weller	263	15.3	−9.5
Liberal Democrats	Alastair Mason	218	12.7	−9.5
Majority		976	56.7	+28.5
Turnout		1,720	38	−36
PAB hold		Swing		

Springbank
Party	Candidate	Votes	%	±%
Liberal Democrats	Suzanne Williams	675	65.3	+3.4
Labour	Clive Harriss	189	18.3	N/A
Conservative	Jonathan Moffitt	170	16.4	−12.0
Majority		486	47.0	+8.2
Turnout		1,034	21	−33
Liberal Democrats hold		Swing		

St Marks
Party	Candidate	Votes	%	±%
Liberal Democrats	Chris Coleman	634	51.5	−3.8
Conservative	Andrew Coffey	267	21.7	−7.6
Labour	Rod Gay	210	17.0	+6.4
Green	Demelza Jones	121	9.8	+5.0
Majority		367	29.8	+3.8
Turnout		1,232	27	−32
Liberal Democrats hold		Swing		

St Pauls
Party	Candidate	Votes	%	±%
Liberal Democrats	Andrew Lansley	355	51.2	−13.7
Labour	Phillip Vincent	139	20.1	N/A
Conservative	Steve Thomas	124	17.9	−7.1
Green	Jack Guest	75	10.8	+0.7
Majority		216	31.1	−8.9
Turnout		693	15	−29
Liberal Democrats hold		Swing		

St Peters
Party	Candidate	Votes	%	±%
Liberal Democrats	John Rawson*	702	63.8	+3.7
Conservative	Lucy Strachan	217	19.7	−10.5
Labour	Robert Irons	181	16.5	+6.8
Majority		485	44.1	+14.2
Turnout		1,100	22	−33
Liberal Democrats hold		Swing		

Swindon Village
Party	Candidate	Votes	%	±%
Liberal Democrats	Bernard Fisher*	835	76.1	+11.0
Conservative	Christine Anderson	262	23.9	−11.0
Majority		573	52.2	+21.9
Turnout		1,097	25	−34
Liberal Democrats hold		Swing		

Up Hatherley
Party	Candidate	Votes	%	±%
Liberal Democrats	Roger Whyborn*	901	52.1	+6.1
Conservative	George Askew	552	31.9	−14.1
UKIP	George Askew	275	15.9	N/A
Majority		349	20.2	+20.2
Turnout		1,728	42	−35
Liberal Democrats hold		Swing		

Warden Hill
Party	Candidate	Votes	%	±%
Conservative	Anne Regan*	709	60.8	+15.4
Liberal Democrats	Cindy Bexfield	249	21.4	−26.4
Green	Adam van Coevorden	208	17.8	+11.0
Majority		460	39.4	+37.0
Turnout		1,578	36	−37
Conservative hold		Swing		
