= 2002 Cheltenham Borough Council election =

2002 UK local government election

Results of the 2002 Cheltenham Borough Council election

The 2002 Cheltenham Council election took place on 2 May 2002 to elect members of Cheltenham Borough Council in Gloucestershire, England. The whole council was up for election with boundary changes since the last election in 2000 reducing the number of seats by 1. The Liberal Democrats gained overall control of the council from the Conservative Party.

== Election results ==
The results saw the Liberal Democrats gain control after winning an extra 10 councillors.

Cheltenham local election result 2002
Party	Seats	Gains	Losses	Net gain/loss	Seats %	Votes %	Votes	+/−
Liberal Democrats	21			+10	52.5	44.3	25,006	+7.6
Conservative	13			-10	32.5	40.9	23,086	-7.0
PAB	4			-1	10.0	8.9	4,999	+2.6
Labour	2			0	5.0	5.0	2,804	-3.6
Green	0			0	0.0	1.0	556	+0.6

== Ward results ==
All Saints (2)
Party	Candidate	Votes	%	±%
Liberal Democrats	Christine Franklin	813	58.9	
Liberal Democrats	Stephen Jordan	800	57.9	
Conservative	John Newman	463	33.5	
Conservative	Paul Simons*	456	33.0	
Labour	Brenda Moody	116	8.4	
Turnout		1,381	33.7	

Battledown (2)
Party	Candidate	Votes	%	±%
Conservative	Paul McLain*	711	46.5	
Conservative	Hedley Thompson*	711	46.5	
Liberal Democrats	Susan Needs	701	45.9	
Liberal Democrats	Alan White	699	45.7	
Labour	David Evans	97	6.3	
Turnout		1,528	42.6	

Benhall & The Reddings (2)
Party	Candidate	Votes	%	±%
Liberal Democrats	Nigel Britter	1,082	58.6	
Liberal Democrats	Andrew Rickell	948	51.3	
Conservative	Jacqueline Fletcher*	836	45.3	
Conservative	Timothy Harman	720	39.0	
Turnout		1,847	45.7	

Charlton Kings (2)
Party	Candidate	Votes	%	±%
Conservative	Jennifer Moreton*	981	55.2	
Conservative	Duncan Smith*	903	50.8	
Liberal Democrats	Stephen Harvey	715	40.2	
Liberal Democrats	Heather Turner	500	28.1	
Green	Celia Bear	133	7.5	
Labour	Lorna Steers	123	6.9	
Turnout		1,777	41.6	

Charlton Park (2)
Party	Candidate	Votes	%	±%
Conservative	Brian Chaplin*	1,179	64.1	
Conservative	John Melville-Smith*	1,109	60.3	
Liberal Democrats	John Finnemore	567	30.8	
Liberal Democrats	Anthony Oliver	542	29.5	
Labour	David Addison	93	5.1	
Turnout		1,839	46.4	

College (2)
Party	Candidate	Votes	%	±%
Liberal Democrats	Garth Barnes	772	50.4	
Liberal Democrats	Lloyd Surgenor	736	48.1	
Conservative	Penelope Hall	628	41.0	
Conservative	Robert Evans	621	40.6	
Green	Christopher Chatfield	120	7.8	
Labour	Gillian Howells	85	5.6	
Turnout		1,531	37.6	

Hesters Way (2)
Party	Candidate	Votes	%	±%
Liberal Democrats	Lydia Bishop	614	67.5	
Liberal Democrats	Wendy Young	584	64.2	
Conservative	Daphne Allen	186	20.5	
Conservative	Lesley Silvester	170	18.7	
Labour	Robert Wells	131	14.4	
Turnout		909	23.0	

Lansdown (2)
Party	Candidate	Votes	%	±%
Conservative	Barbara Driver*	746	63.1	
Conservative	Diggory Seacome*	725	61.3	
Liberal Democrats	Michael Storm	288	24.4	
Liberal Democrats	Martin Horwood	274	23.2	
Green	Keith Bessant	140	11.8	
Labour	Katya Vines	88	7.4	
Turnout		1,182	30.0	

Leckhampton (2)
Party	Candidate	Votes	%	±%
Conservative	Kenneth Buckland*	1,186	54.1	
Conservative	Robin MacDonald*	1,181	53.9	
Liberal Democrats	Dermot Clarke	977	44.6	
Liberal Democrats	John Coleman	949	43.3	
Turnout		2,193	55.0	

Oakley (2)
Party	Candidate	Votes	%	±%
Labour	Martin Hale*	610	56.6	
Labour	Diana Hale*	583	54.1	
Liberal Democrats	Barrie Anderson	254	23.6	
Liberal Democrats	Sandra Wheeler	202	18.8	
Conservative	Clare Huckett	187	17.4	
Conservative	Sophie Preston-Hall	182	16.9	
Turnout		1,077	26.4	

Park (2)
Party	Candidate	Votes	%	±%
Conservative	Robert Garnham*	996	56.3	
Conservative	Gerald Gearing*	951	53.7	
Liberal Democrats	Michael Pictor	744	42.0	
Liberal Democrats	William Whelan	650	36.7	
Turnout		1,770	40.0	

Pittville (2)
Party	Candidate	Votes	%	±%
PAB	Diane Hibbert*	752	44.6	
PAB	David Prince*	723	42.9	
Conservative	Gary Bowden*	574	34.0	
Conservative	John Hopwood	502	29.8	
Liberal Democrats	Colin Hay	268	15.9	
Liberal Democrats	Kirstie Clish-Green	257	15.2	
Labour	Edward Hemmings	156	9.2	
Turnout		1,687	40.5	

Prestbury (2)
Party	Candidate	Votes	%	±%
PAB	Leslie Godwin*	1,187	63.5	
PAB	Malcolm Stennett*	1,171	62.7	
Conservative	Martin Locke	488	26.1	
Conservative	Paul Ryder	383	20.5	
Liberal Democrats	Jennifer Jones	202	10.8	
Liberal Democrats	Elizabeth Whalley	99	5.3	
Green	Caroline Griffiths	93	5.0	
Turnout		1,868	40.7	

Springbank (2)
Party	Candidate	Votes	%	±%
Liberal Democrats	Christopher Morris	603	64.5	
Liberal Democrats	Simon Wheeler	547	58.5	
Conservative	James Stevenson	196	21.0	
Conservative	Antony Sygerycz	157	16.8	
Labour	Clive Harriss	151	16.1	
Turnout		935	21.9	

St. Mark's (2)
Party	Candidate	Votes	%	±%
Liberal Democrats	Sandra Holliday*	709	62.1	
Liberal Democrats	Clive Lloyd*	698	61.1	
Conservative	Michael Horton	301	26.4	
Conservative	Andrew Wall	274	24.0	
Labour	Andre Curtis	157	13.7	
Turnout		1,142	26.0	

St. Paul's (2)
Party	Candidate	Votes	%	±%
Liberal Democrats	Andrew McKinlay*	523	70.6	
Liberal Democrats	Christopher Coleman	441	59.5	
Conservative	Christopher Anstey	104	14.0	
Labour	William Fawcett	94	12.7	
Conservative	Patrick Corbyn	86	11.6	
Green	Jennifer Stone	70	9.4	
Turnout		741	16.9	

St. Peter's (2)
Party	Candidate	Votes	%	±%
Liberal Democrats	Pat Thornton*	535	51.9	
Liberal Democrats	James Stuart-Smith*	462	44.9	
Conservative	Roger Marchant	426	41.4	
Conservative	Robert Bird	333	32.3	
Labour	Robert Irons	152	14.8	
Turnout		1,030	23.8	

Swindon Village (2)
Party	Candidate	Votes	%	±%
Liberal Democrats	James Ledeux	725	49.3	
Liberal Democrats	Robert Jones	699	47.6	
PAB	Joanna McVeagh*	598	40.7	
PAB	Peter Allen	568	38.6	
Conservative	Anthony Fletcher	178	12.1	
Conservative	Terence Gould	170	11.6	
Turnout		1,470	33.1	

Up Hatherley (2)
Party	Candidate	Votes	%	±%
Liberal Democrats	Zoe Forbes	1,015	57.0	
Liberal Democrats	David Fidgeon	1,002	56.3	
Conservative	Eric Baylis*	708	39.8	
Conservative	Alan Nicholson	589	33.1	
Turnout		1,781	42.6	

Warden Hill (2)
Party	Candidate	Votes	%	±%
Liberal Democrats	Rowena Hay	945	48.2	
Conservative	Anne Regan	911	46.5	
Conservative	Christine Ryder*	878	44.8	
Liberal Democrats	John Oates	865	44.1	
Labour	Christopher Bailey	168	8.6	
Turnout		1,961	45.3	
