= 2009 Gloucestershire County Council election =

2009 UK local government election

- 4 June 2009

All 63 seats in the Gloucestershire County Council 32 seats needed for a majority
	First party	Second party	Third party
Leader	Barry Dare	Jeremy Hilton	Steve McHale
Party	Conservative	Liberal Democrats	Labour
Leader's seat	Moreton-Stow	Westgate	Robinswood
Last election	34	13	12
Seats before	33	14	12
Seats won	42	13	4
Seat change	▲8	-	▼8
Popular vote	99,726	68,637	25,300
Percentage	44.3%	30.5%	11.3%
- Map of the results of the 2009 Gloucestershire council election. Conservatives in blue, Liberal Democrats in yellow, Labour in red, People Against Bureaucracy in pink, Greens in green and independent in grey.
Majority party before election
Conservative
Majority party after
election
No Overall Control

Elections to Gloucestershire County Council took place on 4 June 2009 as part of the 2009 United Kingdom local elections, having been delayed from 7 May, to coincide with elections to the European Parliament. All of the Council's 62 seats were up for election. Most divisions returned one County Councillor under the first past the post system which is used for most local government elections in England and Wales. However, some divisions especially those that were based upon towns too small for two divisions but too large for one returned two Councillors using the block vote variant of FPTP used for some English and Welsh local elections.

All locally registered electors (British, Irish, Commonwealth and European Union citizens) who were aged 18 or over on Thursday 2 May 2013 were entitled to vote in the local elections. Those who were temporarily away from their ordinary address (for example, away working, on holiday, in student accommodation or in hospital) were also entitled to vote in the local elections, although those who had moved abroad and registered as overseas electors cannot vote in the local elections. It is possible to register to vote at more than one address (such as a university student who had a term-time address and lives at home during holidays) at the discretion of the local Electoral Register Office, but it remains an offence to vote more than once in the same local government election.

== Results Summary ==
Gloucestershire County Council election, 2009
Party	Seats	Gains	Losses	Net gain/loss	Seats %	Votes %	Votes	+/−
Conservative	42	9	1	+8	66.7	44.3	99,726	+5.3
Liberal Democrats	13	2	2	0	20.6	30.5	68,637	±0
Labour	4	0	8	-8	6.3	11.3	25,300	-12.8
PAB	2	0	0	0	3.2	1.7	3,834	+0.4
Green	1	1	0	+1	1.6	7.5	16,777	+5.2
Independent	1	0	0	0	1.6	3.0	6,685	+1.0
UKIP	0	0	0	0	0.0	1.8	3,968	+1.3
BNP	0	0	0	0	0.0	0.008	183	+0.008
Residents	0	0	1	-1	0.0	0.0	0	-0.4

== Results by Division ==
=== Cheltenham ===
All Saints division
Party	Candidate	Votes	%	±%
Conservative	Duncan Smith	3,216	45	−1
Conservative	Klara Sudbury	3,212	45	+6
Liberal Democrats	Christopher Coleman	2,740	38	+6
Liberal Democrats	Garth Barnes	2,712	38	+2
Green	Catherine Green	862	12	+12
UKIP	David Blair	501	7	+3
Labour	Sandra Easton-Lawrence	282	4	−7
Majority		472	7	
Conservative hold		Swing		
Conservative hold		Swing		

Charlton Kings division
Party	Candidate	Votes	%	±%
Conservative	Paul McClain	1,838	51	+4
Liberal Democrats	Paul McCloskey	1,260	35	−1
Green	Sarah Field	363	10	+3
Labour	Neville Mozley	126	4	−6
Majority		578	16	
Conservative hold		Swing		

Hesters Way and Up Hatherley division
Party	Candidate	Votes	%	±%
Liberal Democrats	Christopher Pallett	2,138	45	+10
Liberal Democrats	Simon Wheeler	2,111	44	+2
Conservative	Tim Harman	1,799	38	+2
Conservative	Chris Mason	1,786	37	+1
Green	Geoffrey Foster	622	13	+4
Labour	Brian Hughes	189	4	−11
Labour	Clive Harriss	176	4	+4
Majority		312	6	
Liberal Democrats hold		Swing		
Liberal Democrats gain from Conservative		Swing		

Lansdown, Park and Warden Hill division
Party	Candidate	Votes	%	±%
Conservative	Rob Garnham	2,716	53	+9
Conservative	Antonia Noble	2,596	50	+16
Liberal Democrats	Sarah McColl	1,693	33	+3
Liberal Democrats	Gareth Webb	1,326	26	−1
Green	Timothy Bonsor	816	16	+5
Labour	Kevin Boyle	319	6	−6
Majority		903	17	
Conservative hold		Swing		
Conservative hold		Swing		

Oakley, Pittville and Prestbury division
Party	Candidate	Votes	%	±%
PAB	Diane Hibbert	1,965	40	+5
PAB	David Prince	1,869	39	+5
Liberal Democrats	Martin Dunne	1,239	26	+2
Conservative	Haydn Pearl	1,216	25	+3
Conservative	Nathan Weller	1,211	25	+5
Liberal Democrats	Charles Macgregor Stewart	994	20	+2
Labour	Diane Hale	337	7	−5
Labour	John Phipps	245	5	−7
Majority		630	13	
PAB hold		Swing		
PAB hold		Swing		

Springbank division
Party	Candidate	Votes	%	±%
Liberal Democrats	Suzanne Williams	1,359	67	+31
Conservative	Clare Huckett	670	33	+8
Majority		689	34	
Liberal Democrats hold		Swing		

St. Mark's, St. Paul's and St. Peter's division
Party	Candidate	Votes	%	±%
Liberal Democrats	Charmain Sheppard	1,769	47	+6
Liberal Democrats	Mike Skinner	1,570	41	+2
Conservative	Andy Coffey	963	25	−3
Conservative	Emma Logan	877	23	+1
Green	Adrian Becker	597	16	+2
UKIP	Peter Bowman	580	15	+15
Labour	Rod Gay	264	7	−12
Labour	Robert Irons	238	6	−9
Majority		607	16	
Liberal Democrats hold		Swing		
Liberal Democrats hold		Swing		

=== Cotswolds ===
Bourton division
Party	Candidate	Votes	%	±%
Conservative	David Thorpe	2,423	76	+17
Liberal Democrats	Roberta Crawley	781	24	−17
Majority		1,642	52	
Conservative hold		Swing		

Cirencester division
Party	Candidate	Votes	%	±%
Conservative	John Burgess	2,241	43	+11
Conservative	Peter Braidwood	2,231	43	+15
Liberal Democrats	Deryck Nash	2,027	39	−2
Liberal Democrats	Andy Rickell	1,632	31	−12
Green	Robert Irving	929	18	+18
Labour	Clive Baker	345	7	−15
Labour	Jane Weston	306	6	−8
Majority		204	4	
Conservative gain from Liberal Democrats		Swing		
Conservative gain from Liberal Democrats		Swing		

East Cotswold division
Party	Candidate	Votes	%	±%
Conservative	Raymond Theodoulou	2,109	63	+15
Liberal Democrats	Frank Skinner	1,243	37	+1
Majority		766	26	
Conservative hold		Swing		

Moreton-Stow division
Party	Candidate	Votes	%	±%
Conservative	Barry Dare	1,815	64	+24
Liberal Democrats	Giles Derrington	846	30	+10
Labour	Christopher Hourihan	182	6	−5
Majority		969	34	
Conservative hold		Swing		

North Cotswold division
Party	Candidate	Votes	%	±%
Conservative	Lynden Stowe	1,969	70	+4
Liberal Democrats	Andrew Clayton	862	30	−4
Majority		1,107	40	
Conservative hold		Swing		

Northleach division
Party	Candidate	Votes	%	±%
Conservative	Fiona McKenzie	1,891	56	−5
Liberal Democrats	Dave Kerr-Rettie	1,511	44	+18
Majority		380	12	
Conservative hold		Swing		

South Cotswold division
Party	Candidate	Votes	%	±%
Conservative	Shaun Parsons	1,744	57	+5
Liberal Democrats	Anne Clark	1,147	37	+6
Labour	Christopher Giles	187	6	−11
Majority		597	20	
Conservative hold		Swing		

Tetbury division
Party	Candidate	Votes	%	±%
Conservative	Tony Hicks	1,800	63	+20
Liberal Democrats	Darren McLauchlan	698	24	+2
Labour	Shirley Mosdell	356	13	−10
Majority		1,102	39	
Conservative hold		Swing		

=== Forest of Dean ===
Brooksdean division
Party	Candidate	Votes	%	±%
Conservative	Brian Robinson	1,172	41	+21
Liberal Democrats	Sue Henchly	921	32	+10
Labour	Bruce Hogan	788	27	−8
Majority		251	9	
Conservative gain from Labour		Swing		

Cinderford division
Party	Candidate	Votes	%	±%
Labour	Graham Morgan	935	45	−12
Conservative	Brian Jones	730	35	+10
Liberal Democrats	Johnathan Gault	417	20	+2
Majority		205	10	
Labour hold		Swing		

Coleford division
Party	Candidate	Votes	%	±%
Conservative	Terry Hale	735	32	+1
Independent	Mike Meridith-Edwards	648	28	+28
Labour	Helen Stewart	384	17	−26
Liberal Democrats	Heather Lusty	320	14	−12
Green	Sean Walsh	193	9	+9
Majority		87	4	
Conservative gain from Labour		Swing		

Lydney division
Party	Candidate	Votes	%	±%
Conservative	David Cooksley	790	32	−11
Independent	Alan Preest	577	24	−19
Labour	Bill Osbourne	429	17	−23
Liberal Democrats	Susan Warren	361	15	−2
Green	Adrian Jones	299	12	+12
Majority		213	8	
Conservative hold		Swing		

Note: Alan Preest stood as the Conservative candidate in 2005. Both his and David Cooksley's change in vote shares are shown in relation to Preest's 2005 vote.

Mid-Dean division
Party	Candidate	Votes	%	±%
Conservative	Stephen McMillan	1,703	56	+11
Liberal Democrats	Bridget King	565	19	−21
Green	James Greenwood	461	15	+15
Labour	David Thompson	291	10	−5
Majority		1,138	37	
Conservative hold		Swing		

Newent division
Party	Candidate	Votes	%	±%
Conservative	Will Windsor-Clive	1,743	38	−14
Independent	Philip Burford	1,502	33	+33
Labour	Cherry Burrow	1,351	29	+14
Majority		241	5	
Conservative hold		Swing		

Pillowell and Little Dean division
Party	Candidate	Votes	%	±%
Conservative	Martin Quaile	1,270	43	+12
Labour	Max Coborn	581	20	−16
Green	Rebekah Hoyland	566	19	+19
Liberal Democrats	Heather Dalziel	530	18	−8
Majority		689	23	
Conservative gain from Labour		Swing		

Tidenham division
Party	Candidate	Votes	%	±%
Conservative	Brian Thornton	1,317	47	+5
Liberal Democrats	Roy Birch	764	27	−10
Green	Robin Larkenham	470	17	+17
Labour	Di Martin	252	9	−12
Majority		553	20	
Conservative hold		Swing		

West Dean division
Party	Candidate	Votes	%	±%
Conservative	Terry Glastonbury	1,231	38	+3
Labour	Bill Evans	758	24	−11
Independent	Mary Meredith-Edwards	482	15	+15
Liberal Democrats	David Wheeler	400	12	−17
Green	Margarete Devlin	367	11	+11
Majority		473	14	
Conservative gain from Labour		Swing		

=== City of Gloucester ===
Abbey division
Party	Candidate	Votes	%	±%
Conservative	Andrew Gravells	1,580	60	+8
UKIP	Danny Sparkes	368	14	+11
Liberal Democrats	John McFeely	347	13	−2
Labour	Bernard Mundy	326	13	−17
Majority		1,212	46	
Conservative hold		Swing		

Barnwood division
Party	Candidate	Votes	%	±%
Liberal Democrats	Philip McEllan	1,588	57	+14
Conservative	Peter Barnes	955	35	+6
Labour	Mark Johnson	225	8	−20
Majority		633	22	
Liberal Democrats hold		Swing		

Barton and Tredworth division
Party	Candidate	Votes	%	±%
Labour	Sonia Friend	663	30	−17
Liberal Democrats	Usman Bhaimia	639	29	+1
Conservative	Yakub Pandor	630	29	+11
Green	Bryan Meloy	275	12	+5
Majority		24	1	
Labour hold		Swing		

Hucclecote division
Party	Candidate	Votes	%	±%
Liberal Democrats	Bill Crowther	1,958	68	+14
Conservative	Brian Edge	797	28	±0
Labour	Roger Mills	135	4	−14
Majority		1,161	40	
Liberal Democrats hold		Swing		

Longlevens division
Party	Candidate	Votes	%	±%
Conservative	Kathy Williams	1,860	59	+19
Liberal Democrats	Jayna Tyler	937	30	−9
Labour	Terry Haines	345	11	−10
Majority		923	39	
Conservative hold		Swing		

Moreland division
Party	Candidate	Votes	%	±%
Conservative	Mark Hawthorne	865	39	+11
Labour	Geraldene Gillespie	738	34	−18
Green	Jennifer Hume	351	16	+9
Liberal Democrats	Andrew Meads	236	11	−2
Majority		127	5	
Conservative gain from Labour		Swing		

Podsmead division
Party	Candidate	Votes	%	±%
Conservative	Gerald Dee	1,065	46	+8
Labour	Tony Lewis	635	27	−19
Liberal Democrats	Micheal Power	338	14	−2
Green	Matthew Sidford	292	13	+13
Majority		430	19	
Conservative gain from Labour		Swing		

Quedgeley division
Party	Candidate	Votes	%	±%
Conservative	Jackie Hall	2,424	47	+6
Conservative	Vic Rice	1,796	35	−2
Liberal Democrats	Kevin Daws	1,067	21	−1
Labour	David (Against Incineration) Purchase	860	17	−18
Liberal Democrats	Jeremey Whittaker	815	16	+3
Labour	Shaun Shute	717	14	−16
Independent	Faye Elliot	684	13	+13
Green	Charley Bircher	677	13	+13
Majority		729	14	
Conservative hold		Swing		
Conservative hold		Swing		

Robinswood division
Party	Candidate	Votes	%	±%
Labour	Steve McHale	893	37	−13
Conservative	Ruth Jacobs	794	33	+5
UKIP	Mike Smith	392	16	+11
Liberal Democrats	Paul Harris	220	9	−5
Independent	Alex McKee	124	5	+5
Majority		99	4	
Labour hold		Swing		

Westgate division
Party	Candidate	Votes	%	±%
Liberal Democrats	Jeremy Hilton	2,034	41	+10
Conservative	Pam Tracey	1,796	36	+3
Liberal Democrats	Kelsa Rowlands-Evans	1,649	33	+4
Conservative	Paul Toleman	1,504	30	−1
UKIP	Bob Mace	617	12	+8
Labour	David Hitchings	513	10	−15
Green	Alexander Evans	493	10	+3
Labour	Daniel King	470	9	−9
Majority		147	3	
Liberal Democrats hold		Swing		
Conservative hold		Swing		

=== Stroud ===
Berkeley Vale division
Party	Candidate	Votes	%	±%
Conservative	Basil Booth	2,106	60	+9
Liberal Democrats	John Howe	572	16	−5
Labour	John Fowles	469	13	−15
Green	Eva Sprange	388	11	+11
Majority		1,534	44	
Conservative hold		Swing		

Cam and Dursley division
Party	Candidate	Votes	%	±%
Conservative	Brian Tipper	2,189	37	+7
Liberal Democrats	Dennis Andrewartha	2,067	35	±0
Conservative	Carlyn Chisholm	2,046	35	+7
Liberal Democrats	Brian Marsh	1,573	27	+3
Labour	Miranda Clifton	1,173	20	−19
Labour	Geoff Wheeler	1,149	19	−12
Green	Indigo Redfern	598	10	+10
Green	Miriam Yagud	451	8	+8
Majority		21	0.3	
Conservative gain from Labour		Swing		
Liberal Democrats hold		Swing		

Chalford division
Party	Candidate	Votes	%	±%
Conservative	Chas Fellows	1,317	44	−3
Green	Carolyn Billingsley	729	24	+24
UKIP	Adrian Blake	347	12	+12
Liberal Democrats	Adrian Walker-Smith	339	11	−18
Labour	John Appleton	262	9	−15
Majority		588	20	
Conservative hold		Swing		

Nailsworth and Minchinhampton division
Party	Candidate	Votes	%	±%
Conservative	Stan Waddington	1,764	42	±0
Green	Sophie Barton	1,183	28	+28
Labour	Jo Smith	489	12	−18
UKIP	Steve Parker	359	9	+9
Liberal Democrats	Colleen Rothwell	343	8	−15
Independent	Hansjorg Patterson	32	1	+1
Majority		581	14	
Conservative hold		Swing		

North Stroud division
Party	Candidate	Votes	%	±%
Conservative	Anthony Blackburn	1,220	47	+4
Labour	Ken Stephens	570	22	−15
Green	John Fowles	504	19	+19
Liberal Democrats	Howe Millner	314	12	−8
Majority		650	25	
Conservative hold		Swing		

Rodborough division
Party	Candidate	Votes	%	±%
Conservative	Stephen Glanfield	1,196	35	−4
Liberal Democrats	Christine Headley	1,061	32	+7
Green	Phil Blomberg	716	21	+21
Labour	Sally Thorpe	415	12	−24
Majority		135	3	
Conservative hold		Swing		

Stonehouse division
Party	Candidate	Votes	%	±%
Labour	Lesley Williams	1,041	38	−12
Conservative	John Jeffreys	925	34	+1
Green	Tony McNulty	300	11	+11
Liberal Democrats	Ian Owen	260	10	−7
BNP	Alan Lomas	183	7	+7
Majority		116	4	
Labour hold		Swing		

Stroud East division
Party	Candidate	Votes	%	±%
Green	Sarah Lunnon	1,450	43	+16
Conservative	Nigel Cooper	835	25	±0
Labour	Brian Oosthuysen	795	23	−12
Liberal Democrats	Doug Janke	298	9	−4
Majority		615	18	
Green gain from Labour		Swing		

Stroud West division
Party	Candidate	Votes	%	±%
Conservative	Mike Williams	964	36	+6
Labour	Karon Cross	950	36	−11
Green	Helen Cranston	369	14	+14
Liberal Democrats	Sylvia Bridgland	360	14	−9
Majority		14	0.5	
Conservative gain from Labour		Swing		

Upton St. Leonard's, Bisley and Painswick division
Party	Candidate	Votes	%	±%
Conservative	Joan Nash	2,318	62	+11
Green	Peter Adams	679	18	+18
Liberal Democrats	Robert Jones	443	12	−21
Labour	Ela Pathak-Sen	303	8	−8
Majority		1,639	44	
Conservative hold		Swing		

Wotton-Under-Edge division
Party	Candidate	Votes	%	±%
Liberal Democrats	John Cordwell	1,527	47	+3
Conservative	Dorcas Binns	1,154	35	−4
Green	David Barker	397	12	+12
Labour	Jane Terry	207	6	−11
Majority		373	12	
Liberal Democrats hold		Swing		

=== Tewkesbury ===
Ashchurch, Cleeve and Oxenton Hill division
Party	Candidate	Votes	%	±%
Conservative	Gordon Shurmer	1,971	65	+13
Liberal Democrats	Sue Hillier-Richardson	922	30	−18
Labour	John Hurley	146	5	+5
Majority		1,049	35	
Conservative hold		Swing		

Brockworth division
Party	Candidate	Votes	%	±%
Liberal Democrats	Mike Collins	1,081	48	+36
Conservative	Ron Furolo	958	42	+15
Labour	Keir Dillon	220	10	−15
Majority		123	6	
Liberal Democrats gain from Residents		Swing		

Note: The Liberal Democrats had previously gained Brockworth in a by-election. They here consolidated this gain.

Churchdown Brookfield division
Party	Candidate	Votes	%	±%
Conservative	Robert Vines	1,067	35	−7
Independent	Brian Jones	862	28	+28
Liberal Democrats	Gill Blackwell	833	27	−14
Green	Leo Fletcher	165	6	+2
Labour	Royston Ansley	119	4	−9
Majority		205	7	
Conservative hold		Swing		

Churchdown St. John's division
Party	Candidate	Votes	%	±%
Liberal Democrats	Bill Whelan	1,648	63	+22
Conservative	Colin Baker	798	31	−6
Labour	Hazel Saunders	156	6	−16
Majority		850	32	
Liberal Democrats hold		Swing		

Cleeve division
Party	Candidate	Votes	%	±%
Liberal Democrats	Ceri Jones	2,466	72	+1
Conservative	Allan Roberts	866	25	−4
Labour	David Hilton	113	3	+3
Majority		1,600	47	
Liberal Democrats hold		Swing		

Severn Vale division
Party	Candidate	Votes	%	±%
Conservative	Philip Awford	2,026	67	+19
Liberal Democrats	Peter Richmond	682	23	−14
Labour	Thomas Elsey	305	10	−5
Majority		1,344	44	
Conservative hold		Swing		

Tewkesbury division
Party	Candidate	Votes	%	±%
Independent	Mike Sztymiak	1,774	39	+11
Conservative	Vernon Smith	1,714	38	+8
Conservative	Graham Dawson	1,609	35	+7
UKIP	Robert Smart	804	18	+18
Green	Robert Brooks	708	16	+16
Liberal Democrats	Richard Hart	560	12	−4
Liberal Democrats	Steve Woodrow	496	11	±0
Labour	Paul Shevlin	355	8	−15
Labour	Dominic Moffitt	230	5	−11
Majority		105	3	
Independent hold		Swing		
Conservative hold		Swing		

Winchcombe division
Party	Candidate	Votes	%	±%
Conservative	Ron Allen	1,783	59	−3
Liberal Democrats	Paul Astbury	1,003	33	+10
Labour	Sue Sturgeon	255	8	−7
Majority		780	26	
Conservative hold		Swing		
