= 2013 Gloucestershire County Council election =

2013 UK local government election

- 2 May 2013

All 53 seats to Gloucestershire County Council 27 seats needed for a majority
	First party	Second party
Party	Conservative	Liberal Democrats
Seats won	23	14
Seat change	▼13	▲4
	Third party	Fourth party
Party	Labour	UKIP
Seats won	9	3
Seat change	▲5	▲3
- Map showing the results of the 2013 Gloucestershire County Council elections.
Council control before election
Conservative
Council control after election
No Overall Control

Elections to Gloucestershire County Council took place on 2 May 2013 as part of the 2013 United Kingdom local elections. 53 electoral divisions elected one county councillor each by first-past-the-post voting for a four-year term of office. No elections were held in South Gloucestershire, which is a unitary authority outside the area covered by the County Council.

Control of the council went from the Conservative Party to no party having overall control. Turnout across the county was 32% with 151,250 votes cast. The Conservatives gained most votes in four of the six parliamentary seats, the Liberal Democrats coming first in Cheltenham and UKIP in the Forest of Dean. The Conservatives were the only party to win a county council seat in every district. (Note: However, note that this was an election to the county council only; elections to district councils are held in other years.)

All locally registered electors (British, Irish, Commonwealth and European Union citizens) who were aged 18 or over on Thursday 2 May 2013 were entitled to vote in the local elections. Those who were temporarily away from their ordinary address (for example, away working, on holiday, in student accommodation or in hospital) were also entitled to vote in the local elections, although those who had moved abroad and registered as overseas electors cannot vote in the local elections. It is possible to register to vote at more than one address (such as a university student who had a term-time address and lives at home during holidays) at the discretion of the local Electoral Register Office, but it remains an offence to vote more than once in the same local government election.

== County Council single-member electoral review 2012-13 ==
Going into the elections, the Conservatives held a majority of 21 seats. Due to boundary changes and a reduction in the number of councillors from 63 to 53 (Note: Although described in the official consultation as an open proposal as to the Size of Council, this denotes the number of councillors only, not relating to budget or number of local government staff.) following a public consultation by the Local Government Boundary Commission for England the notional results to be used for the purposes of election planning and comparison before the election were: Conservatives - 36, Liberal Democrats - 10, Labour - 4, People Against Bureaucracy - 1, Greens - 1, Independents - 1. This gave a notional Conservative majority of 17 seats.

== Summary ==
The Conservative Party lost 13 notional seats, although the numerical loss was larger due to the reduction in the total number of councillors. The Liberal Democrats remained the second largest party by total seats and percentage vote, while the Labour Party had the largest net gain of five seats. UKIP won representation on the county council for the first time, winning three seats.

The number of Independent councillors rose to two, while both the Green Party and People Against Bureaucracy saw their only councillors re-elected.

== Results ==
Gloucestershire County Council election, 2013
Party	Seats	Gains	Losses	Net gain/loss	Seats %	Votes %	Votes	+/−
Conservative	23	1	14	-13	43.4	34.5	52,410	-9.8%
Liberal Democrats	14	5	1	+4	26.4	20.3	30,891	-10.2%
Labour	9	5	0	+5	17.0	18.2	27,725	+6.9%
UKIP	3	3	0	+3	5.7	15.2	23,046	+13.4%
Independent	2	1	0	+1	3.8	3.5	5,387	+0.5%
Green	1	0	0	±0	1.9	6.8	10,266	-0.7%
PAB	1	0	0	±0	1.9	1.2	1,791	-0.5%
TUSC	0	0	0	±0	0	0.3	450	+0.3%

== Results by District ==
Within Cheltenham District
Party	Seats	Gains	Losses	Net gain/loss	Seats %	Votes %	Votes	+/−
Liberal Democrats	7	2	0	+2	70	38.00	10,407	
Conservative	2	0	2	-2	20	28.47	7,797	
UKIP	0	0	0	±0	0	14.08	3,857	
PAB	1	0	0	±0	10	6.54	1,791	
Labour	0	0	0	±0	0	6.49	1,777	
Green	0	0	0	±0	0	5.78	1,583	
TUSC	0	0	0	±0	0	0.57	155	n/a
Independent	0	0	0	±0	0	0.07	19	n/a

Within Cotswold District
Party	Seats	Gains	Losses	Net gain/loss	Seats %	Votes %	Votes	+/−
Conservative	5	0	3	-3	62.5	41.90	9,954	
Liberal Democrats	3	3	0	+3	37.5	26.38	6,268	
UKIP	0	0	0	±0	0	17.76	4,219	n/a
Labour	0	0	0	±0	0	7.87	1,870	
Green	0	0	0	±0	0	3.80	902	
Independent	0	0	0	±0	0	2.29	545	n/a

Within Forest of Dean District
Party	Seats	Gains	Losses	Net gain/loss	Seats %	Votes %	Votes	+/−
UKIP	3	3	0	+3	37.5	28.34	6,247	n/a
Labour	2	1	0	+1	25	24.00	5,292	
Conservative	2	0	5	-5	25	23.85	5,257	
Independent	1	1	0	+1	12.5	13.86	3,055	
Liberal Democrats	0	0	0	±0	0	5.43	1,198	
Green	0	0	0	±0	0	4.40	970	
TUSC	0	0	0	±0	0	0.13	28	n/a

Within Gloucester District
Party	Seats	Gains	Losses	Net gain/loss	Seats %	Votes %	Votes	+/−
Conservative	4	0	2	-2	40	34.18	9,142	
Labour	4	2	0	+2	40	23.85	5,257	
UKIP	0	0	0	±0	0	18.36	4,909	
Liberal Democrats	2	0	0	±0	20	17.57	4,699	
Green	0	0	0	±0	0	3.15	843	
TUSC	0	0	0	±0	0	0.89	237	n/a

Within Stroud District
Party	Seats	Gains	Losses	Net gain/loss	Seats %	Votes %	Votes	+/−
Conservative	5	0	2	-2	50	34.70	11,238	
Labour	3	2	0	+2	30	28.12	9,106	
Green	1	0	0	±0	10	17.55	5,683	
Liberal Democrats	1	0	0	±0	10	9.90	3,207	
UKIP	0	0	0	±0	0	8.77	2,839	
Independent	0	0	0	±0	0	0.87	281	
TUSC	0	0	0	±0	0	0.09	30	n/a

Within Tewkesbury District
Party	Seats	Gains	Losses	Net gain/loss	Seats %	Votes %	Votes	+/−
Conservative	5	1	0	+1	71.4	45.92	9,022	
Liberal Democrats	1	0	1	-1	14.3	26.02	5,112	
Labour	0	0	0	±0	0	14.07	2,764	
Independent	1	0	0	±0	14.3	7.57	1,487	
UKIP	0	0	0	±0	0	4.96	975	
Green	0	0	0	±0	0	1.46	286	

== Results by Division ==
=== Cheltenham ===
All Saints and Oakley
Party	Candidate	Votes	%	±%
Liberal Democrats	Colin Hay	1,046	50	
Conservative	Steve Thomas	511	24	
Labour	Diana Hale	301	14	
Green	Adrian Becker	245	12	
Majority		535	26	
Liberal Democrats hold		Swing		

Battledown and Charlton Kings
Party	Candidate	Votes	%	±%
Conservative	Paul McLain	1,215	36	
Liberal Democrats	Michael Collins	1,169	35	
UKIP	Justin Dunne	615	18	
Labour	Kevin Boyle	184	5	
Green	Jon Stubbings	182	5	
Majority		46	1	
Conservative hold		Swing		

Benhall and Up Hatherley
Party	Candidate	Votes	%	±%
Liberal Democrats	Simon Wheeler	1,427	41	
Conservative	Lewis Feilder	932	27	
UKIP	Jeff Hack	822	24	
Labour	Brian Hughes	156	4	
Green	Timothy Bonsor	138	4	
Majority		495	14	
Liberal Democrats hold		Swing		

Charlton Park and College
Party	Candidate	Votes	%	±%
Liberal Democrats	Klara Sudbury	1,533	47	
Conservative	Matt Babbage	1,174	36	
UKIP	Alan Stone	352	11	
Labour	Emma Clifford	207	6	
Majority		359	11	
Liberal Democrats gain from Conservative		Swing		

Hesters Way and Springbank
Party	Candidate	Votes	%	±%
Liberal Democrats	Suzanne Williams	1,007	53	
Conservative	Elizabeth Fox	444	23	
Labour	Clive Harriss	299	16	
TUSC	Joanna Hughes	155	8	
Majority		563	30	
Liberal Democrats hold		Swing		

Lansdown and Park
Party	Candidate	Votes	%	±%
Conservative	Tim Harman	1,280	46	
Liberal Democrats	Maximilian Wilkinson	786	28	
UKIP	Mark Daniel	373	13	
Green	Vanessa Angelo-Thompson	184	7	
Labour	Robert Irons	170	6	
Independent	Radek Walesa	19	1	
Majority		494	18	
Conservative hold		Swing		

Leckhampton and Warden Hill
Party	Candidate	Votes	%	±%
Liberal Democrats	Iain Dobie	1,140	34	
Conservative	Rosemary Harvey	1,111	33	
UKIP	Christina Simmonds	779	23	
Green	Sarah Field	372	11	
Majority		29	1	
Liberal Democrats gain from Conservative		Swing		

Pittville and Prestbury
Party	Candidate	Votes	%	±%
PAB	David Prince	1,791	59	
Conservative	Lucy Strachan	493	16	
Liberal Democrats	Robert Jones	456	15	
UKIP	Jean Bamford	315	10	
Majority		1,298	43	
PAB hold		Swing		

St Mark's and St Peter's
Party	Candidate	Votes	%	±%
Liberal Democrats	Christopher Coleman	1,015	44	
UKIP	Peter Bowman	614	27	
Conservative	Andrew Coffey	319	14	
Labour	Rod Gay	234	10	
Green	Demelza Jones	129	6	
Majority		401	17	
Liberal Democrats hold		Swing		

St Paul's and Swindon
Party	Candidate	Votes	%	±%
Liberal Democrats	Bernard Fisher	828	46	
UKIP	Ann Homer	417	23	
Conservative	Emily Croft	318	18	
Labour	Mark Hobbs	228	13	
Majority		411	23	
Liberal Democrats hold		Swing		

=== Cotswold ===
Bourton-on-the-Water and Northleach
Party	Candidate	Votes	%	±%
Liberal Democrats	Paul Hodgkinson	1,275	39	
Conservative	David Thorpe	1,216	37	
UKIP	Christopher Cooke	591	18	
Labour	Merilyn Hill	170	5	
Majority		59	2	
Liberal Democrats gain from Conservative		Swing		

Campden-Vale
Party	Candidate	Votes	%	±%
Conservative	Lynden Stow	1,818	62	
UKIP	Michael Fitzgerald	481	16	
Liberal Democrats	Peter Sipthorp	419	14	
Labour	Glyn Ford	230	8	
Majority		1,337	46	
Conservative hold		Swing		

Cirencester Beeches
Party	Candidate	Votes	%	±%
Liberal Democrats	Nigel Robbins	1,156	39	
Conservative	John Burgess	930	31	
UKIP	Chris Harlow	588	20	
Labour	Terry Pomroy	165	6	
Green	Joy Irving	119	4	
Majority		226	8	
Liberal Democrats gain from Conservative		Swing		

Cirencester Park
Party	Candidate	Votes	%	±%
Liberal Democrats	Joe Harris	1,690	55	
Conservative	Tony Curry	688	22	
UKIP	Robert Stephens	442	14	
Labour	Reg Eyre	166	5	
Green	Bob Irving	92	3	
Majority		1,002	33	
Liberal Democrats gain from Conservative		Swing		

Fairford and Lechlade on Thames
Party	Candidate	Votes	%	±%
Conservative	Raymond Theodoulou	1,372	48	
UKIP	Geoff Willis	532	19	
Liberal Democrats	Laura Watts	486	17	
Labour	Trevor Smith	284	10	
Green	Xanthe Messenger	174	6	
Majority		840	29	
Conservative hold		Swing		

South Cerney
Party	Candidate	Votes	%	±%
Conservative	Shaun Parsons	1,175	39	
Liberal Democrats	Mike Evemy	840	28	
UKIP	Guy Parfitt	546	18	
Labour	Jon Easterbrook	221	7	
Green	Nick Gibbs	155	5	
Independent	Sandy Steel	112	4	
Majority		335	11	
Conservative hold		Swing		

Stow-on-the-Wold
Party	Candidate	Votes	%	±%
Conservative	Nigel Moor	1,643	57	
UKIP	Rob Woodhouse	514	18	
Labour	Jude Walker	332	11	
Green	Andrew Maclean	219	8	
Liberal Democrats	Danny Loveridge	185	6	
Majority		1,131	39	
Conservative hold		Swing		

Tetbury
Party	Candidate	Votes	%	±%
Conservative	Anthony Hicks	1,112	41	
UKIP	Jenny Knight	525	19	
Independent	David Painter	433	16	
Labour	Chris Giles	302	11	
Liberal Democrats	Stephen Radford-Hancock	217	8	
Green	Brecon Quaddy	143	5	
Majority		587	22	
Conservative hold		Swing		

=== Forest of Dean ===
Blakeney and Bream
Party	Candidate	Votes	%	±%
UKIP	Richard Leppington	1,190	36	
Labour	Bill Evans	1,096	33	
Conservative	Diana Edwards	856	26	
Liberal Democrats	Zoe Forbes	208	6	
Majority		94	3	
UKIP gain from Conservative		Swing		

Cinderford
Party	Candidate	Votes	%	±%
Labour	Graham Morgan	1,018	47	
UKIP	Ann Guyton	601	28	
Conservative	Neville Freeman	275	13	
Liberal Democrats	Heather Dalziel	160	7	
Green	Sid Phelps	102	5	
TUSC	Claude Mickleson	28	1	
Majority		417	39	
Labour hold		Swing		

Coleford
Party	Candidate	Votes	%	±%
Labour	Paul McMahon	825	33	
UKIP	Alan Grant	623	25	
Conservative	Terry Hale	617	25	
Independent	Ian Whitburn	315	13	
Liberal Democrats	Heather Lusty	122	5	
Majority		202	8	
Labour gain from Conservative		Swing		

Drybrook and Lydbrook
Party	Candidate	Votes	%	±%
UKIP	Colin Guyton	824	29	
Labour	Bruce Hogan	713	25	
Independent	Andrew Gardiner	666	24	
Conservative	Brian Jones	416	15	
Green	Bob Rhodes	120	4	
Liberal Democrats	Melanie Hughes	74	3	
Majority		111	4	
UKIP gain from Conservative		Swing		

Lydney
Party	Candidate	Votes	%	±%
UKIP	Alan Preest	1,075	42	
Labour	Di Martin	492	19	
Conservative	Terry Glastonbury	461	18	
Independent	David Cooksley	347	14	
Green	James Greenwood	188	7	
Majority		583	23	
UKIP gain from Conservative		Swing		

Mitcheldean
Party	Candidate	Votes	%	±%
Independent	Norman Stephens	1,152	36	
Conservative	Brian Robinson	772	24	
UKIP	Tim Congdon	612	19	
Labour	David Thomson	328	10	
Liberal Democrats	Sue Henchley	179	6	
Green	Ken Power	120	4	
Majority		380	12	
Independent gain from Conservative		Swing		

Newent
Party	Candidate	Votes	%	±%
Conservative	Will Windsor-Clive	988	37	
UKIP	John Sullivan	597	22	
Independent	Philip Burford	575	21	
Labour	Janet Royall	332	12	
Green	David Humphrey	129	5	
Liberal Democrats	David Fidgeon	65	2	
Majority		391	15	
Conservative hold		Swing		

Sedbury
Party	Candidate	Votes	%	±%
Conservative	Patrick Molyneux	872	31	
UKIP	John McOwan	725	26	
Labour	Malcolm Sadler	488	18	
Liberal Democrats	David Wheeler	390	14	
Green	Chris McFarling	311	11	
Majority		147	5	
Conservative hold		Swing		

=== Gloucester ===
Abbey
Party	Candidate	Votes	%	±%
Conservative	Andrew Gravells	1,390	47	
UKIP	Danny Sparkes	687	23	
Labour	Emily Barrett	532	18	
Liberal Democrats	Mike Anderton	284	10	
Green	Charley Bircher	81	3	
Majority		703	24	
Conservative hold		Swing		

Barnwood and Hucclecote
Party	Candidate	Votes	%	±%
Liberal Democrats	David Brown	1,530	41	
Conservative	Lise Noakes	1,143	31	
UKIP	Steve Pottage	693	19	
Labour	Shaun Shute	357	10	
Majority		387	10	
Liberal Democrats hold		Swing		

Barton and Tredworth
Party	Candidate	Votes	%	±%
Labour	Jasminder Gill	1,220	46	
Conservative	Sajid Patel	1,095	42	
TUSC	John Ewers	177	7	
Liberal Democrats	Tom Etheridge	146	6	
Majority		125	4	
Labour hold		Swing		

Coney Hill and Matson
Party	Candidate	Votes	%	±%
Labour	Stephen McHale	997	46	
UKIP	Gary Cleaver	643	30	
Conservative	Tarren Randle	353	16	
Liberal Democrats	Declan Wilson	117	5	
TUSC	Susan Powell	60	3	
Majority		354	16	
Labour hold		Swing		

Grange and Kingsway
Party	Candidate	Votes	%	±%
Labour	Barry Kirby	790	36	
Conservative	Dave Norman	697	32	
UKIP	Rosemary Marchmont	518	24	
Green	Frances Griffiths	91	4	
Liberal Democrats	Stephen Power	80	4	
Majority		93	4	
Labour gain from Conservative		Swing		

Hempsted and Westgate
Party	Candidate	Votes	%	±%
Conservative	Pam Tracey	902	45	
Labour	Gary Mills	660	33	
Green	Matthew Sidford	272	14	
Liberal Democrats	Sebastian Field	161	8	
Majority		242	12	
Conservative hold		Swing		

Kingsholm and Wotton
Party	Candidate	Votes	%	±%
Liberal Democrats	Jeremy Hilton	1,020	41	
Labour	David Hitchings	477	19	
Conservative	Matthew Stevens	413	17	
UKIP	Mike Smith	412	17	
Green	Jonathan Ingleby	138	6	
Majority		543	22	
Liberal Democrats hold		Swing		

Longlevens
Party	Candidate	Votes	%	±%
Conservative	Kathy Williams	1,353	41	
UKIP	Jack Bavin	768	23	
Liberal Democrats	Mike Whyham	667	20	
Labour	Patrick Sweeney	360	11	
Green	Chris Britton	139	4	
Majority		585	18	
Conservative hold		Swing		

Quedgeley
Party	Candidate	Votes	%	±%
Conservative	Mark Hawthorne	797	32	
Liberal Democrats	Anna Mozol	560	23	
UKIP	Daryl Stanbury	496	20	
Labour	Kevin Neal	479	20	
Green	Gerald Hartley	121	5	
Majority		237	9	
Conservative hold		Swing		

Tuffley
Party	Candidate	Votes	%	±%
Labour	Tracy Millard	1,044	36	
Conservative	Colin Morgan	999	35	
UKIP	Allen Prout	692	24	
Liberal Democrats	Isabel Brazil	134	5	
Majority		45	1	
Labour gain from Conservative		Swing		

=== Stroud ===
Bisley and Painswick
Party	Candidate	Votes	%	±%
Conservative	Jason Bullingham	1,500	41	
Green	Anna Bonallack	928	25	
UKIP	Duncan Richardson	625	17	
Labour	Sheila McGrath	456	12	
Liberal Democrats	Daniel Murch	145	4	
Majority		572	16	
Conservative hold		Swing		

Cam Valley
Party	Candidate	Votes	%	±%
Conservative	Brian Tipper	1,479	43	
Labour	John Fowles	1,409	41	
Liberal Democrats	Thomas Cairns	315	9	
Green	Tony McNulty	271	8	
Majority		70	2	
Conservative hold		Swing		

Dursley
Party	Candidate	Votes	%	±%
Labour	Stephen Lydon	1,003	35	
Conservative	Alex Stennett	952	33	
Liberal Democrats	Brian Marsh	558	20	
Green	Nicola Hillary	345	12	
Majority		51	2	
Labour gain from Conservative		Swing		

Hardwicke and Severn
Party	Candidate	Votes	%	±%
Conservative	Anthony Blackburn	1,246	52	
Labour	Sarah Madley	658	27	
Green	Sue Hartley	367	15	
Liberal Democrats	Myles Robinson	129	5	
Majority		588	25	
Conservative hold		Swing		

Minchinhampton
Party	Candidate	Votes	%	±%
Conservative	Stan Waddington	1,243	33	
Green	John Williams	946	25	
UKIP	Adrian Blake	743	20	
Labour	David Taylor	637	17	
Liberal Democrats	Felicity Hornby	153	4	
Majority		297	8	
Conservative hold		Swing		

Nailsworth
Party	Candidate	Votes	%	±%
Conservative	Dorcas Binns	1,351	42	
Labour	Jo Smith	1,128	35	
Green	Uta Baldauf	578	18	
Liberal Democrats	Paul McCloskey	135	4	
Majority		223	7	
Conservative hold		Swing		

Rodborough
Party	Candidate	Votes	%	±%
Labour	Brian Oosthuysen	1,318	43	
UKIP	Richard Williams	549	18	
Conservative	Rodger Cuddingham	546	18	
Green	Philip Blomberg	340	11	
Liberal Democrats	Christine Headley	297	10	
Majority		769	25	
Labour gain from Conservative		Swing		

Stonehouse
Party	Candidate	Votes	%	±%
Labour	Lesley Williams	1,111	44	
Conservative	Lawrie Hall	458	18	
UKIP	Steve Parker	410	16	
Independent	Trevor Barker	281	11	
Green	Claire Sheridan	183	7	
Liberal Democrats	Roberta Crawley	73	3	
TUSC	Chris Moore	30	1	
Majority		653	26	
Labour hold		Swing		

Stroud Central
Party	Candidate	Votes	%	±%
Green	Sarah Lunnon	1,501	40	
Labour	Tosca Cabello-Watson	1,042	28	
Conservative	Debbie Young	577	15	
UKIP	Harry Carr	512	14	
Liberal Democrats	Adrian Walker-Smith	108	3	
Majority		459	12	
Green hold		Swing		

Wotton-under-Edge
Party	Candidate	Votes	%	±%
Liberal Democrats	John Cordwell	1,251	43	
Conservative	Lesley Reeves	1,114	38	
Labour	Laurence Cotterell	344	12	
Green	Graham Spencer	224	8	
Majority		137	5	
Liberal Democrats hold		Swing		

=== Tewkesbury ===
Bishops Cleeve
Party	Candidate	Votes	%	±%
Conservative	Robert Bird	1,486	49	
Liberal Democrats	Peter Richmond	1,129	37	
Labour	John Hurley	396	13	
Majority		357	12	
Conservative gain from Liberal Democrats		Swing		

Brockworth
Party	Candidate	Votes	%	±%
Conservative	Robert Vines	1,173	42	
Liberal Democrats	Jude Perez	1,152	41	
Labour	Edward Buxton	470	17	
Majority		21	1	
Conservative hold		Swing		

Churchdown
Party	Candidate	Votes	%	±%
Liberal Democrats	Bill Whelan	1,439	49	
Conservative	Graham Bocking	873	30	
Labour	David Carter	414	14	
Green	Leo Fletcher	227	8	
Majority		566	19	
Liberal Democrats hold		Swing		

Highnam
Party	Candidate	Votes	%	±%
Conservative	Phil Awford	1,930	67	
Labour	Keir Dhillon	544	19	
Liberal Democrats	Audrey Ricks	407	14	
Majority		1,386	48	
Conservative hold		Swing		

Tewkesbury
Party	Candidate	Votes	%	±%
Independent	Mike Sztymiak	982	40	
Conservative	Kevin Cromwell	724	29	
UKIP	Stuart Adair	496	20	
Labour	Mike Reynolds	201	8	
Liberal Democrats	Pearl Stokes	72	3	
Majority		258	11	
Independent hold		Swing		

Tewkesbury East
Party	Candidate	Votes	%	±%
Conservative	Vernon Smith	909	37	
Independent	Gordon Shurmer	505	21	
UKIP	Steve Cooper	479	20	
Liberal Democrats	Cindy Bexfield	250	10	
Labour	Rosemary Phillips	223	9	
Green	Robert Brookes	59	2	
Majority		404	16	
Conservative hold		Swing		

Winchcombe
Party	Candidate	Votes	%	±%
Conservative	Roger Wilson	1,927	62	
Liberal Democrats	Sue Hillier-Richardson	663	21	
Labour	Susan Sturgeon	516	17	
Majority		1,264	41	
Conservative hold		Swing		

== Changes 2013–2017 ==
In July 2016, UKIP group leader Alan Preest defected to the Conservatives, claiming that the party lacked a purpose following the EU Referendum. He was followed shortly thereafter by UKIP councillor Colin Guyton, who left UKIP to serve as an independent. He later resigned from the County Council entirely, but a by-election was not held in his division due to the short length of time between then and the 2017 local elections.

=== Mitcheldean ===
A by-election was held for the Mitcheldean Division on 23 October 2014 following the death of Independent councillor Norman Stephens.

Mitcheldean by-election 23 October 2014
Party	Candidate	Votes	%	±%
Conservative	Brian Robinson	959	38	+14
UKIP	Malcolm Berry	550	22	+3
Independent	Ian Whitburn	455	18	+18
Labour	Jackie Fraser	278	11	+1
Liberal Democrats	Sue Henchley	150	5	−1
Green	Ken Power	106	4	−
Turnout				
Conservative gain from Independent		Swing		

=== Churchdown ===
A by-election was held on Thursday 5 May 2016 for the Churchdown Division due to the death of County Councillor Bill Whelan.

Churchdown by-election 5 May 2016
Party	Candidate	Votes	%	±%
Liberal Democrats	Jack Williams	1,700	54	+5
Conservative	Graham Bocking	1,062	34	+4
Labour	Edward Buxton	359	12	−2
Turnout				
Liberal Democrats hold		Swing		

== Notes and references ==
Notes

4. ^ http://glostext.gloucestershire.gov.uk/mgElectionResults.aspx?ID=3&V=1&RPID=32877983 - Accessed 4-5-2013
