= Sarah Lunnon =

British climate activist and former Green Party councillor

Sarah Lunnon is a British climate activist and former Green Party politician. She was a councillor in Stroud District Council and in Gloucestershire before becoming associated with Extinction Rebellion, Insulate Britain, and Just Stop Oil. She is known as a co-founder of Just Stop Oil.

== Career ==
Sarah Lunnon first worked as an historic building surveyor.

=== Politics ===
Lunnon joined the Green Party around 1999, while living in Stroud.

She was elected to Gloucestershire County Council in 2009 as a Green councillor for Stroud East. She was elected in 2013 for Stroud Central. As a county councillor, Lunnon objected to the Javelin Park Incinerator project. In 2015, Lunnon called for the county council's pension investment strategy to support renewable energy. She stood down from this role in 2017.

In March 2015, the Stroud Greens announced Lunnon as their candidate for Stroud at the 2015 general election. She stood again for the party in Stroud at the 2017 general election. Lunnon was also the Stroud Town councillor for Valley ward between 2016 and 2020.

== Climate activism ==
=== Extinction Rebellion ===
Lunnon became associated with Extinction Rebellion (XR) in its early days (2019) and was its political spokesperson for some time. In October 2019, Lunnon appeared on BBC Newsnight as an XR activist in a discussion with climatologist Myles Allen about the campaign's claims and tactics. Also that month, she debated Nigel Farage on LBC. She was quoted by BBC News in coverage of XR demonstrations around Parliament Square in September 2020, saying "the failure to act on [the climate crisis] will have a catastrophic impact on the future of us and the generations to come. We want to make our voices heard. This is the biggest issue facing us".

=== Just Stop Oil ===
Lunnon was a co-founder of Just Stop Oil in 2022.

In February 2024, she wrote in The Guardian that as the Conservative and Labour parties had failed to respond to global warming and reduce fossil fuel use, Just Stop Oil intended to stand or support independents at the 2024 general election. Lunnon's article drew criticism as it referred to lobbying MPs "at their offices, in their constituencies, and at their homes" as part of opposing policies such as the Conservative pledge for annual licensing rounds for North Sea oil and gas. Labour/Co-op MP Stella Creasy said that targeting MPs at their homes was "unacceptable".

Lunnon was awaiting trial for slow marching in February 2024. In March 2025, BBC News reported that the group was ending its campaign of civil disobedience following the Labour government's commitment not to issue new oil and gas licences, with Lunnon commenting that "a key principle of the civil disobedience movement was that activists would take responsibility for their actions". In April 2025, she was quoted in an examination of the effect of UK protest legislation and policing on climate activism, saying that "the movement is there, nobody is calling it a day, [and] we know, morally, that we have to continue".

=== Insulate Britain ===
Lunnon has also campaigned with Insulate Britain.

=== Other campaigns ===
Lunnon has also been associated with democracy campaigns that emerged from XR, including Burning Pink. In 2024, Lunnon was reported to be involved in "Assemble" – a deliberative democracy initiative which advocated for greater use of citizens' assemblies. According to Waging Nonviolence, "Assemble" emerged from discussions within the UK climate movement about how to combine climate activism with democratic reform – with Lunnon commenting that "the system of government we have is incapable of addressing the climate crisis, [and] unless we change how we're governed, we cannot win".

In September 2024, Defend Our Juries quoted her as part of its Free Political Prisoners campaign.

== Views ==
Lunnon and others have argued that the use of injunctions, public nuisance charges and lengthy sentences for climate protesters "undermine" the right to peaceful protest and fair trial protections. Lunnon said that "the Labour Government needs to free the political prisoners – cancel the Tory North Sea oil consents – and end oil, gas and coal use by 2030. Not to do so is to be complicit in a planned genocide. We have a moral duty to defend those who will be harmed".

== Other activities ==
In June 2022, Lunnon joined Hilary Cottam in a panel discussion chaired by Damon Silvers as part of the IIPP Climate Change, Labour and Innovation Lecture Series at University College London.
