= 2006 Cheltenham Borough Council election =

County Council election in the United Kingdom

Results of the 2006 Cheltenham Borough Council election

The 2006 Cheltenham Council election took place on 4 May 2006 to elect members of Cheltenham Borough Council in Gloucestershire, England. Half of the council was up for election and the council stayed under no overall control.

After the election, the composition of the council was:

- Liberal Democrat 17
- Conservative 17
- People Against Bureaucracy 5
- Labour 1

== Election result ==
Results of the election saw the Conservatives and Liberal Democrats end with 17 seats each. The Labour Party lost one of their two seats leaving the People Against Bureaucracy Action Group holding the balance of power. Overall turnout in the election was 36.32%.

After the election Conservative Duncan Smith took over as leader of the council, replacing Liberal Democrat Andrew McKinlay, after the Conservatives received the backing of the People Against Bureaucracy Action Group.

Cheltenham local election result 2006
Party	Seats	Gains	Losses	Net gain/loss	Seats %	Votes %	Votes	+/−
Liberal Democrats	10	1	2	-1	50.0	40.8	12,714	+6.3%
Conservative	8	2	0	+2	40.0	45.9	14,281	+2.4%
PAB	2	0	0	0	10.0	8.3	2,570	-1.4%
Labour	0	0	1	-1	0	4.4	1,360	-4.1%
Independent	0	0	0	0	0	0.5	141	-0.9%
UKIP	0	0	0	0	0	0.2	70	+0.2%

== Ward results ==
All Saints
Party	Candidate	Votes	%	±%
Liberal Democrats	Christine Franklin*	639	51.1	+6.8
Conservative	Susan McArdle	469	37.5	+3.4
Labour	Sandra Easton-Lawrence	73	5.8	−3.1
UKIP	Timothy Warry	70	5.6	N/A
Majority		170	13.6	+3.4
Turnout		1,251	30.1	−4.5
Liberal Democrats hold		Swing		

Battledown
Party	Candidate	Votes	%	±%
Conservative	Paul McLain*	1,032	68.3	+7.4
Liberal Democrats	Paul Wheeldon	387	25.6	−5.2
Labour	Catherine Mozeley	92	6.1	−2.3
Majority		645	42.7	+12.6
Turnout		1,511	42.8	−5.5
Conservative hold		Swing		

Benhall and Reddings
Party	Candidate	Votes	%	±%
Liberal Democrats	Nigel Britter*	971	52.8	+12.5
Conservative	Michael D'Ambrosio	810	44.0	−9.4
Labour	Brian Hughes	58	3.2	−3.1
Majority		161	8.8	−4.3
Turnout		1,839	45.8	−2.3
Liberal Democrats hold		Swing		

Charlton Kings
Party	Candidate	Votes	%	±%
Conservative	Christine Ryder*	1,113	58.8	+3.0
Liberal Democrats	Stephen Harvey	681	36.0	+1.1
Labour	Neville Mozely	99	5.2	−4.2
Majority		432	22.8	+1.9
Turnout		1,893	45.3	−4.3
Conservative hold		Swing		

Charlton Park
Party	Candidate	Votes	%	±%
Conservative	Penelope Hall	1,236	64.1	+0.1
Liberal Democrats	Iain Dobie	693	35.9	+6.8
Majority		543	28.1	−6.9
Turnout		1,929	48.6	−1.0
Conservative hold		Swing		

College
Party	Candidate	Votes	%	±%
Liberal Democrats	Garth Barnes*	904	55.8	+9.1
Conservative	Heather McLain	715	44.2	+6.2
Majority		189	11.7	+3.0
Turnout		1,619	37.4	−4.5
Liberal Democrats hold		Swing		

Hesters Way
Party	Candidate	Votes	%	±%
Liberal Democrats	Lydia Bishop*	846	66.4	+22.3
Conservative	Philip Woolley	331	26.0	+7.4
Labour	Kevin Boyle	97	7.6	−0.7
Majority		515	40.4	+25.3
Turnout		1,274	28.3	−0.9
Liberal Democrats hold		Swing		

Lansdown
Party	Candidate	Votes	%	±%
Conservative	Barbara Driver*	880	68.2	+7.1
Liberal Democrats	Michael Pictor	410	31.8	+8.0
Majority		470	36.4	−0.9
Turnout		1,290	29.7	−3.4
Conservative hold		Swing		

Leckhampton
Party	Candidate	Votes	%	±%
Conservative	Kenneth Buckland*	1,258	60.5	−9.8
Liberal Democrats	Christopher Braunholtz	823	39.5	+15.5
Majority		435	20.9	−25.5
Turnout		2,081	51.4	−0.8
Conservative hold		Swing		

Oakley
Party	Candidate	Votes	%	±%
Liberal Democrats	Colin Hay	598	45.5	+8.3
Labour	Martin Hale*	478	36.4	−1.6
Conservative	Lawrence McArdle	237	18.1	−6.7
Majority		120	9.1	+8.3
Turnout		1,313	32.3	−0.3
Liberal Democrats gain from Labour		Swing		

Park
Party	Candidate	Votes	%	±%
Conservative	Robert Garnham*	1,308	66.2	+7.1
Liberal Democrats	Bernard Fisher	668	33.8	+1.3
Majority		640	32.4	+5.8
Turnout		1,976	40.5	−3.5
Conservative hold		Swing		

Pittville
Party	Candidate	Votes	%	±%
PAB	Diane Hibbert*	750	45.8	−2.3
Liberal Democrats	Rowena Hay**	417	25.5	+11.0
Conservative	Stephen Wilkins	409	25.0	−6.1
Labour	Frank Bench	62	3.8	N/A
Majority		333	20.3	+3.4
Turnout		1,638	38.9	−5.0
PAB hold		Swing		

Rowena Hay was a sitting councillor for Warden Hill.

Prestbury
Party	Candidate	Votes	%	±%
PAB	Leslie Godwin*	1,050	54.8	+0.4
Conservative	Eric Baylis	642	33.5	+5.1
Liberal Democrats	Philip Brown	225	11.7	+3.8
Majority		408	21.3	−4.7
Turnout		1,917	42.2	−3.4
PAB hold		Swing		

Springbank
Party	Candidate	Votes	%	±%
Liberal Democrats	Christopher Morris*	687	61.9	+8.3
Conservative	Anthony Sygerycz	422	38.1	+4.0
Majority		265	23.9	+4.4
Turnout		1,109	24.1	−0.2
Liberal Democrats hold		Swing		

St Marks
Party	Candidate	Votes	%	±%
Liberal Democrats	Sandra Holliday*	681	54.2	+7.6
Conservative	Timothy Rogers	447	35.6	−0.1
Labour	Clive Harriss	129	10.3	−7.4
Majority		234	18.6	+7.8
Turnout		1,257	28.2	−3.8
Liberal Democrats hold		Swing		

St Pauls
Party	Candidate	Votes	%	±%
Liberal Democrats	Andrew McKinlay*	424	51.2	−12.4
Conservative	Christopher Anstey	155	18.7	+2.0
Independent	Diane Hayes	141	17.0	N/A
Labour	Jonquil Naish	108	13.0	N/A
Majority		269	32.5	−14.4
Turnout		828	19.5	−1.9
Liberal Democrats hold		Swing		

St Peters
Party	Candidate	Votes	%	±%
Liberal Democrats	Pat Thornton*	542	46.2	+1.4
Conservative	John Hopwood	529	45.1	+8.7
Labour	Robert Irons	103	8.8	−1.5
Majority		13	1.1	−7.3
Turnout		1,174	25.4	−5.0
Liberal Democrats hold		Swing		

Swindon Village
Party	Candidate	Votes	%	±%
Liberal Democrats	Paul Massey	687	47.7	+9.8
PAB	Joanna McVeagh	506	35.1	−6.4
Conservative	Leon Mekitarian	247	17.2	+1.9
Majority		181	12.6	+9.0
Turnout		1,440	32.1	−4.5
Liberal Democrats hold		Swing		

Up Hatherley
Party	Candidate	Votes	%	±%
Conservative	David Hall	873	44.7	+9.7
Liberal Democrats	Roger Whyborn	755	38.7	+5.3
PAB	Martin Burford	264	13.5	−11.7
Labour	Gillian Howells	61	3.1	−3.3
Majority		118	6.0	+4.4
Turnout		1,953	46.6	+2.5
Conservative gain from Liberal Democrats		Swing		

Warden Hill
Party	Candidate	Votes	%	±%
Conservative	Stuart Hutton	1,168	63.3	+9.0
Liberal Democrats	Lorraine Dunne	676	36.7	−1.1
Majority		492	26.7	+10.2
Turnout		1,844	42.7	−7.3
Conservative gain from Liberal Democrats		Swing		
