= Yvonne Nicholls =

Australian activist and author

Yvonne Isabel Nicholls, née Miles (20 February 1914 – 31 January 2009), was an Australian activist, author, civil libertarian, public speaker and teacher.

Her notable accomplishments include heading a unit that photographed and catalogued science documents in Australia House during World War II, discovering a species of ant endemic to the Otway Ranges (Monomorian yvonnii), contributing to the 1967 referendum campaign to enable the federal government to make laws benefiting Aboriginal Australians, securing the patronage of the Thai Government for a former PEN English-language school in Bangkok, and amassing research through visits to more than 15 countries to develop her popular lecture entitled The Fascinating History of Sex.

== Early life and World War II ==
Born in Melbourne in 1914, Nicholls attended Methodist Ladies' College, Melbourne, and completed a Bachelor of Arts with majors in history and economics at The University of Melbourne in 1936.

After her marriage to scientist Frank Nicholls (1916–2013) in 1940, the couple moved to London, where Frank had been sent to establish the Australian and New Zealand Scientific Liaison Office. During their time at Australia House, Nicholls recruited and trained a team of 20 women to operate a unit that catalogued, photographed, and sent negatives of secret war documents to Australia by air courier.

Following the end of the war, Nicholls and her husband returned to Australia via the United States, where they were entertained by scientist and member of president Franklin Roosevelt's staff, Caryl Parker Haskins. Haskins, a pioneering entomologist in the study of ant biology, expressed his wish to obtain a live colony of Australian bull ants in response to Nicholls' offer of an Australian gift in return for his hospitality. When they returned to Melbourne, Frank introduced Nicholls to John S. Clark, a myrmecologist at the CSIRO, who Nicholls credited with teaching her how to collect and classify ants. It was on one of their field visits to Turton's Pass in the Otway Ranges that Nicholls found a previously unknown ant species, which Clark named Monomorian yvonnii in her honour.

== Not Slaves, Not Citizens ==
Nicholls occupied various positions at the University of Melbourne between 1948 and 1960, during which time she was also involved with the Australian Council for Civil Liberties. In 1952 Nicholls' published a pamphlet, Not Slaves, Not Citizens: Condition of the Australian Aborigines in the Northern Territory, that called for stronger measures to protect Aborigines on reserves, whose way of life had been threatened by rocket tests in outback areas; full citizenship for Aborigines living in 'European' communities, including the right to vote and own property; the abolition of payment in kind for Aborigines on outback stations; and new laws providing Aborigines with protection from racial discrimination.

In addition, Nicholls' pamphlet argued for the retraction of the discretionary power of the Northern Territory Director of Aborigines, who could remove Aborigines from one place to another or confine them in a station, forbid marriages, and act as guardian or remove Aboriginal children. It further advocated for increased spending on education and health, to ensure that all Aboriginal children were provided with an education and communities had access to healthcare centres with trained medical staff. Nicholls suggested that these changes could be achieved either voluntarily by the States, or through a referendum for constitutional change.

Not Slaves, Not Citizens was used by the 'Yes' campaign for the 1967 referendum, which ultimately led to the endorsement of amendments that included of Aboriginal Australians in determinations of population, and empowered of the federal government to legislate specifically for the benefit of Aboriginal Australians.

== Pakistan, Thailand and Switzerland ==
It was during the couple's time in Pakistan in 1959 that Nicholls' interactions with local women of different social classes elicited her interest in the sexual customs of other cultures and traditions. This interest led Nicholls to research the beliefs and traditions of many different cultures, which she would later elaborate upon in her popular lecture, The Fascinating History of Sex.

In 1960 Yvonne and Frank moved to Thailand, where the couple would eventually spend ten years. While her husband worked in a number of roles in the United Nations, Nicholls became the principal of a former PEN English-language school in Bangkok. She secured government patronage of the school, and oversaw its expansion until it covered all school years from kindergarten to Cambridge GSE Level.

Nicholls' time in Thailand also influenced her subsequent study. She completed a Master of Arts from the University of Sydney in 1972, when she published her thesis entitled Thai Kenaf: a case-study of a new cash crop in a developing country of Southeast Asia.

The couple lived in Geneva from 1970 until 1977, where Nicholls published a work entitled Emergence of proposals for recompensing developing countries for maintaining environmental quality for the International Union for Conservation of Nature and Natural Resources.

== Later years ==
After 1977, Nicholls returned to Australia, where she taught at several schools and the Council for Adult Education.

Her extensive experience and interests, combined with her public speaking skills, resulted in her frequent appearances on television, radio and as a guest speaker at events.

Yvonne Nicholls died in Melbourne after a stroke at the age of 94.
