= 2000 Cheltenham Borough Council election =

2000 UK local government election

The 2000 Cheltenham Council election took place on 4 May 2000 to elect members of Cheltenham Borough Council in Gloucestershire, England. One third of the council was up for election and the Conservative Party gained overall control of the council.

After the election, the composition of the council was

- Conservative 24
- Liberal Democrat 12
- People Against Bureaucracy 3
- Labour 2

== Background ==
Since the 1999 election the Conservatives had gained a majority on the council after 2 councillors including 1 Liberal Democrat had defected to them.

== Election result ==
The results saw the Conservatives increase their majority on the council after gaining seats from the Liberal Democrats.

Cheltenham local election result 2000
Party	Seats	Gains	Losses	Net gain/loss	Seats %	Votes %	Votes	+/−
Conservative	7			+2	53.8	47.9	12,499	-0.8%
Liberal Democrats	4			-3	30.8	36.7	9,570	+6.9%
Labour	1			+1	7.7	8.6	2,248	-4.2%
PAB	1			0	7.7	6.3	1,637	-1.9%
Green	0			0	0	0.4	94	+0.0%
The Chaos Party	0			0	0	0.1	34	+0.1%

== Ward results ==
All Saints
Party	Candidate	Votes	%	±%
Conservative	Gary Bowden	939	45.9	+8.6
Liberal Democrats	Christine Franklin*	909	44.4	+12.0
Labour	Brian Cope	198	9.7	−2.0
Majority		30	1.5	−3.4
Turnout		2,046	30.7	+0.0
Conservative gain from Liberal Democrats		Swing		

Charlton Kings
Party	Candidate	Votes	%	±%
Conservative	William Todman*	1,734	65.8	−0.9
Liberal Democrats	Stephen Harvey	729	27.7	+4.2
Labour	Jason Chess	173	6.6	−3.2
Majority		1,005	38.1	−5.0
Turnout		2,636	42.0	−5.9
Conservative hold		Swing		

College
Party	Candidate	Votes	%	±%
Conservative	John Melville-Smith	1,354	45.4	−4.1
Liberal Democrats	Lloyd Surgenor*	1,281	43.0	+13.3
PAB	Alan Stone	249	8.4	−5.6
Labour	Stephen Baxter	98	3.3	−3.4
Majority		73	2.4	−17.4
Turnout		2,982	44.5	−0.3
Conservative gain from Liberal Democrats		Swing		

Hatherley & the Reddings
Party	Candidate	Votes	%	±%
Conservative	Paul McLain*	1,376	50.6	−3.6
Liberal Democrats	Andrew Rickell	1,179	43.3	+5.0
Labour	Betty Bench	167	6.1	−6.8
Majority		197	7.2	
Turnout		2,722	35.7	−0.8
Conservative gain from Liberal Democrats		Swing		

Hesters Way
Party	Candidate	Votes	%	±%
Liberal Democrats	Sandra Holliday*	951	62.6	+9.6
Conservative	Penelope Hall	423	27.8	−0.7
Labour	Richard Moody	146	9.6	−8.9
Majority		528	34.7	+10.1
Turnout		1,520	21.7	+0.5
Liberal Democrats hold		Swing		

Lansdown
Party	Candidate	Votes	%	±%
Conservative	Diggory Seacome	1,009	58.1	−8.9
Liberal Democrats	Robert Jones*	596	34.3	+14.4
Labour	Clive Harriss	132	7.6	−5.5
Majority		413	23.8	−23.3
Turnout		1,737	30.0	+1.8
Conservative gain from Liberal Democrats		Swing		

Leckhampton with Up Hatherley
Party	Candidate	Votes	%	±%
Conservative	Kenneth Buckland*	1,631	72.5	+10.4
Liberal Democrats	Elizabeth Whalley	620	27.5	+11.1
Majority		1,011	44.9	−0.8
Turnout		2,251	34.5	−7.1
Conservative hold		Swing		

Park
Party	Candidate	Votes	%	±%
Conservative	Robert Garnham*	1,375	65.4	+4.2
Liberal Democrats	Christine Bennett	599	28.5	+0.2
Labour	Frank Bench	129	6.1	−4.4
Majority		776	36.9	+4.1
Turnout		2,103	37.6	−1.1
Conservative hold		Swing		

Pittville
Party	Candidate	Votes	%	±%
Labour	Diana Hale	747	42.6	−6.7
Conservative	Christopher Barlow	671	38.2	+7.9
Liberal Democrats	Francis King	337	19.2	−1.2
Majority		76	4.3	−14.6
Turnout		1,755	31.6	−4.2
Labour gain from Liberal Democrats		Swing		

Prestbury
Party	Candidate	Votes	%	±%
PAB	Malcolm Stennett	1,388	58.7	−6.0
Conservative	John Newman*	791	33.4	+6.5
Liberal Democrats	Mary Gray	187	7.9	−0.4
Majority		597	25.2	−12.6
Turnout		2,366	39.2	+5.6
PAB hold		Swing		

St Marks
Party	Candidate	Votes	%	±%
Liberal Democrats	Alexis Cassin*	759	68.1	+19.4
Conservative	James Stevenson	227	20.4	−7.8
Labour	Andre Curtis	128	11.5	−11.6
Majority		532	47.8	+27.2
Turnout		1,114	22.3	+0.5
Liberal Democrats hold		Swing		

St Pauls
Party	Candidate	Votes	%	±%
Liberal Democrats	James Stuart-Smith	694	44.2	+3.3
Conservative	Michael Cupper	618	39.4	−0.9
Labour	William Fawcett	129	8.2	−3.0
Green	Keith Bessant	94	6.0	−1.6
The Chaos Party	Lee Holder	34	2.2	+2.2
Majority		76	4.8	+4.2
Turnout		1,569	25.0	−1.6
Liberal Democrats hold		Swing		

St Peters
Party	Candidate	Votes	%	±%
Liberal Democrats	David Lawrence*	729	56.9	+16.5
Conservative	Anthony Blumer	351	27.4	−10.4
Labour	Robert Irons	201	15.7	−6.1
Majority		378	29.5	+26.9
Turnout		1,281	22.1	−3.4
Liberal Democrats hold		Swing		
