= 1999 Cheltenham Borough Council election =

1999 UK local government election

The 1999 Cheltenham Council election took place on 6 May 1999 to elect members of Cheltenham Borough Council in Gloucestershire, England. One third of the council was up for election and the Liberal Democrats lost overall control of the council to no overall control.

After the election, the composition of the council was

- Conservative 18
- Liberal Democrat 17
- People Against Bureaucracy 5
- Labour 1

== Election result ==
The results saw the Conservatives become the largest party after gaining 9 seats from the Liberal Democrats, therefore depriving the Liberal Democrats of control of the council.

Cheltenham local election result 1999
Party	Seats	Gains	Losses	Net gain/loss	Seats %	Votes %	Votes	+/−
Conservative	9	9	0	+9	56.3	48.7	15,929	+8.1%
Liberal Democrats	4	0	9	-9	25.0	29.8	9,753	-9.0%
PAB	2	0	0	0	12.5	8.2	2,690	-1.9%
Labour	1	0	0	0	6.3	12.8	4,191	+2.6%
Green	0	0	0	0	0	0.4	121	+0.1%

== Ward results ==
All Saints
Party	Candidate	Votes	%	±%
Conservative	Paul Simons	764	37.3	−3.1
Liberal Democrats	Stephen Jordan*	663	32.4	+1.4
PAB	Sally Stringer	381	18.6	+0.0
Labour	Samantha Bailey	239	11.7	+1.7
Majority		101	4.9	−4.5
Turnout		2,047	30.7	+0.5
Conservative gain from Liberal Democrats		Swing		

Charlton Kings
Party	Candidate	Votes	%	±%
Conservative	Barry Curl	1,992	66.7	+11.2
Liberal Democrats	Jeremy Worth*	703	23.5	−21.0
Labour	Frank Bench	293	9.8	+9.8
Majority		1,289	43.1	+32.1
Turnout		2,988	47.9	+6.7
Conservative gain from Liberal Democrats		Swing		

College
Party	Candidate	Votes	%	±%
Conservative	Brian Chaplin	1,488	49.5	+6.2
Liberal Democrats	Mary Gray*	894	29.7	−11.8
PAB	Alan Stone	422	14.0	+3.1
Labour	David Addison	202	6.7	+2.4
Majority		594	19.8	+18.0
Turnout		3,006	44.8	+0.7
Conservative gain from Liberal Democrats		Swing		

Hatherley & the Reddings (3)
Party	Candidate	Votes	%	±%
Conservative	Jacqueline Fletcher	1,518	54.2	+12.6
Conservative	Eric Baylis	1,366	48.8	+7.2
Conservative	Hedley Thompson	1,332	47.6	+6.0
Liberal Democrats	Christopher Read*	1,072	38.3	−4.9
Liberal Democrats	James Stuart-Smith	927	33.1	−10.1
Liberal Democrats	Andrew Williams	880	31.4	−11.8
Labour	Christopher Bailey	361	12.9	+0.9
Labour	Eileen Bailey	330	11.8	−0.2
Turnout		7,786	36.5	+3.8
Conservative gain from Liberal Democrats		Swing		
Conservative gain from Liberal Democrats		Swing		
Conservative gain from Liberal Democrats		Swing		

Hesters Way
Party	Candidate	Votes	%	±%
Liberal Democrats	David Banyard*	794	53.0	−6.9
Conservative	Penelope Hall	426	28.5	+7.4
Labour	Clive Harriss	277	18.5	−0.4
Majority		368	24.6	−14.2
Turnout		1,497	21.2	+0.9
Liberal Democrats hold		Swing		

Lansdown
Party	Candidate	Votes	%	±%
Conservative	Barbara Driver	1,123	67.0	+15.4
Liberal Democrats	Stephen Harvey*	333	19.9	−17.8
Labour	Stephen Baxter	220	13.1	+2.3
Majority		790	47.1	+33.2
Turnout		1,676	28.2	+0.2
Conservative gain from Liberal Democrats		Swing		

Leckhampton with Up Hatherley
Party	Candidate	Votes	%	±%
Conservative	Christine Ryder	1,685	62.1	+4.2
Liberal Democrats	Elizabeth Whalley	445	16.4	−15.8
PAB	Stephen Rudge	302	11.1	+11.1
Labour	Martin Burford	283	10.4	+0.5
Majority		1,240	45.7	+20.0
Turnout		2,715	41.6	+3.5
Conservative gain from Liberal Democrats		Swing		

Park
Party	Candidate	Votes	%	±%
Conservative	Gerald Gearing	1,327	61.2	−1.7
Liberal Democrats	Michael Pictor	615	28.3	−8.8
Labour	Diana Hale	228	10.5	+10.5
Majority		712	32.8	+7.0
Turnout		2,170	38.7	+0.1
Conservative gain from Liberal Democrats		Swing		

Pittville
Party	Candidate	Votes	%	±%
Labour	Martin Hale*	1,002	49.3	+24.0
Conservative	Gary Bowden	617	30.3	+15.9
Liberal Democrats	Francis King	415	20.4	−6.5
Majority		385	18.9	
Turnout		2,034	35.8	−2.3
Labour hold		Swing		

Prestbury
Party	Candidate	Votes	%	±%
PAB	Lesley Silvester	1,310	64.7	+4.8
Conservative	John Walker	545	26.9	+0.7
Liberal Democrats	Robert Lawrence	169	8.3	−2.2
Majority		765	37.8	+4.1
Turnout		2,024	33.6	+1.8
PAB hold		Swing		

St Marks
Party	Candidate	Votes	%	±%
Liberal Democrats	Jeremy Whales*	526	48.7	−13.5
Conservative	James Stevenson	304	28.2	+10.0
Labour	Andre Curtis	249	23.1	+3.5
Majority		222	20.6	−22.0
Turnout		1,079	21.8	+0.6
Liberal Democrats hold		Swing		

St Pauls
Party	Candidate	Votes	%	±%
Liberal Democrats	Andrew McKinlay*	651	40.9	−7.0
Conservative	Susan Godwin	641	40.3	+1.9
Labour	William Fawcett	179	11.2	−2.5
Green	Keith Bessant	121	7.6	+7.6
Majority		10	0.6	−8.9
Turnout		1,592	26.6	+4.3
Liberal Democrats hold		Swing		

St Peters
Party	Candidate	Votes	%	±%
Liberal Democrats	Carol Hawkins*	607	40.4	−13.2
Conservative	Roger Marchant	568	37.8	+13.5
Labour	Robert Irons	328	21.8	−0.3
Majority		39	2.6	−26.7
Turnout		1,503	25.5	+5.1
Liberal Democrats hold		Swing		

Swindon
Party	Candidate	Votes	%	±%
PAB	Joanna McVeagh	275	48.5	N/A
Conservative	Susan Snape	233	41.1	+29.1
Liberal Democrats	Garth Barnes	59	10.4	−38.9
Majority		42	7.4	
Turnout		567	40.1	
PAB gain from Liberal Democrats		Swing		
