= 2022 Cheltenham Borough Council election =

2022 UK local government election

- 5 May 2022

21 out of 40 seats to Cheltenham Borough Council 21 seats needed for a majority

	First party	Second party
Party	Liberal Democrats	Conservative
Last election	31 seats, 42.6%	7 seats, 37.5%
Seats won	18	1
Seats after	31	6
Seat change	Steady	▼1
Popular vote	19,595	9,867
Percentage	55.1%	27.7%
Swing	▲12.5%	▼9.8%
	Third party	Fourth party
Party	PAB	Green
Last election	2 seats, 3.4%	0 seats, 11.0%
Seats won	1	1
Seats after	2	1
Seat change	Steady	▲1
Popular vote	996	4,028
Percentage	2.8%	11.3%
Swing	▼0.6%	▲0.3%
- Winner of each seat at the 2022 Cheltenham Borough Council election
Council control before election
Liberal Democrats
Council control after election
Liberal Democrats

The 2022 Cheltenham Borough Council election took place on 5 May 2022 to elect members of Cheltenham Borough Council in Gloucestershire, England. Half of the council was up for election.

== Results summary ==
35,574

2022 Cheltenham Borough Council election
Party	This election			Full council			This election		
Party	Seats	Net	Seats %	Other	Total	Total %	Votes	Votes %	+/−
Liberal Democrats	18	Steady	85.7	13	31	77.5	19,595	55.1	+12.5
Conservative	1	▼1	4.8	5	6	15.0	9,867	27.7	-9.8
PAB	1	Steady	4.8	1	2	5.0	996	2.8	-0.6
Green	1	▲1	4.8	0	1	2.5	4,028	11.3	+0.3
Labour	0	Steady	0.0	0	0	0.0	1,030	2.9	-2.5
Reform	0	Steady	0.0	0	0	0.0	47	0.1	N/A
TUSC	0	Steady	0.0	0	0	0.0	11	0.0	-0.1

Party	Previous council	New council	+/-
Liberal Democrats	31	31	0
Conservatives	7	6	-1
People Against Bureaucracy	2	2	0
Green Party	0	1	+1
Total	40	40	

== Ward results ==
Incumbent councillors are denoted by an asterisk (*)

=== All Saints ===
All Saints
Party	Candidate	Votes	%	±%
Liberal Democrats	Izaac Augustus Tailford	1,048	62.9	+16.1
Conservative	Peter Christensen	362	21.7	−8.1
Green	Stephen West	145	8.7	−7.2
Labour	Isobel Amy Laing	112	6.7	−0.9
Majority		686	41.2	
Turnout		1,667	38.1	−1.9
Liberal Democrats hold		Swing		

=== Battledown ===
Battledown
Party	Candidate	Votes	%	±%
Conservative	Matt Babbage*	893	46.4	+0.1
Liberal Democrats	Ed Chidley	785	40.8	+1.7
Green	Karen Celia Wilson	246	12.8	+4.3
Majority		108	5.6	
Turnout		1,924	40.0	−6.0
Conservative hold		Swing		

=== Benhall & The Reddings ===
Benhall & The Reddings
Party	Candidate	Votes	%	±%
Liberal Democrats	Nigel Charles Britter*	1,218	66.6	+15.0
Conservative	Michael David Scott Evans	452	24.7	−13.1
Green	Sarah Jane Field	158	8.6	+1.1
Majority		766	41.9	
Turnout		1,828	46.3	−4.7
Liberal Democrats hold		Swing		

=== Charlton Kings ===
Charlton Kings
Party	Candidate	Votes	%	±%
Liberal Democrats	Angie Boyes*	1,222	54.7	+8.3
Conservative	Jake Wilson	743	33.3	−5.6
Green	Daniel Joseph Willey	185	8.3	−2.2
Labour	Caroline Adele Gavin	84	3.8	−0.4
Majority		479	21.4	
Turnout		2,234	50.2	+0.2
Liberal Democrats hold		Swing		

=== Charlton Park ===
Charlton Park
Party	Candidate	Votes	%	±%
Liberal Democrats	Paul Richard Baker*	1,265	58.8	+12.0
Conservative	Georgie Bass	726	33.8	−9.2
Green	Sharon Lorna Wallington	160	7.4	+0.5
Majority		539	25.1	
Turnout		2,151	54.7	−3.3
Liberal Democrats hold		Swing		

=== College ===
College
Party	Candidate	Votes	%	±%
Liberal Democrats	Garth Wallington Barnes*	1,060	56.5	+5.5
Liberal Democrats	Iain Andrew Paterson Dobie**	1,019	54.3	+3.3
Conservative	Rich Newman	418	22.3	−5.6
Conservative	Kenneth Anthony Pollock	397	21.2	−6.7
Green	Elizabeth Johnson	303	16.2	+1.0
Green	Connor Lewis Auker-Howlett	192	10.2	−5.0
Labour	Kevin Michael Boyle	138	7.4	+1.5
Reform	Steven Thomas	47	2.5	N/A
Majority		601	32.0	
Turnout		1,875	42.3	
Liberal Democrats hold		Swing		
Liberal Democrats hold		Swing		

Iain Dobie was a sitting councillor for Warden Hill ward.

=== Hesters Way ===
Hesters Way
Party	Candidate	Votes	%	±%
Liberal Democrats	Simon Albert Wheeler*	632	51.7	+6.3
Conservative	Jerry Forrest	361	29.5	−8.3
Labour	John Malcolm Bride	115	9.4	+1.7
Green	Adrian Becker	104	8.5	−0.2
TUSC	Samuel Jacob Coxson	11	0.9	+0.4
Majority		271	22.2	
Turnout		1,223	24.3	−3.7
Liberal Democrats hold		Swing		

=== Lansdown ===
Lansdown
Party	Candidate	Votes	%	±%
Liberal Democrats	Glenn Andrews	829	51.9	+16.3
Conservative	Chris Mason*	604	37.8	−7.3
Green	Steve Bell	164	10.3	+2.6
Majority		225	14.1	
Turnout		1,597	37.9	−4.1
Liberal Democrats gain from Conservative		Swing		

=== Leckhampton ===
Leckhampton
Party	Candidate	Votes	%	±%
Liberal Democrats	Martin Charles Horwood*	1,446	60.8	+27.7
Conservative	Teresa Anne Prothero	547	23.0	−20.9
Green	Peter Robert Frings	387	16.3	−6.7
Majority		899	37.8	
Turnout		2,380	54.5	−4.5
Liberal Democrats hold		Swing		

=== Oakley ===
Oakley
Party	Candidate	Votes	%	±%
Liberal Democrats	Max Wilkinson*	775	63.5	+15.4
Conservative	James Alan Robert Bass	249	20.4	−13.0
Labour	Michael Jarvis	110	9.0	−0.8
Green	Carl Anthony Parker	87	7.1	−1.5
Majority		526	43.1	
Turnout		1,221	28.3	−0.7
Liberal Democrats hold		Swing		

=== Park ===
Park
Party	Candidate	Votes	%	±%
Liberal Democrats	Jacqueline Ann Chelin	1,304	53.4	+15.7
Conservative	David George Reed	926	37.9	−11.7
Green	Catherine Sunita Lyon Leggett	211	8.6	+0.3
Majority		378	15.5	
Turnout		2,441	48.9	−4.1
Liberal Democrats hold		Swing		

=== Pittville ===
Pittville
Party	Candidate	Votes	%	±%
Liberal Democrats	Julian Charles George Tooke	1,097	52.7	+19.5
Conservative	Jonathan Edward Beeston	663	31.8	−16.5
Green	Daniel Wilson	322	15.5	+4.7
Majority		434	20.8	
Turnout		2,082	42.4	−1.6
Liberal Democrats hold		Swing		

=== Prestbury ===
Prestbury
Party	Candidate	Votes	%	±%
PAB	John Payne*	996	45.7	−4.3
Conservative	Laura Elizabeth Haley	466	21.4	−8.9
Green	Dan Taylor	398	18.3	N/A
Liberal Democrats	Ben Ingram	318	14.6	−5.1
Majority		530	24.3	
Turnout		2,178	44.6	−1.4
PAB hold		Swing		

=== Springbank ===
Springbank
Party	Candidate	Votes	%	±%
Liberal Democrats	Peter Jeremy Jeffries*	1,035	77.2	+24.3
Conservative	Paul Robert Simons	191	14.3	−16.0
Green	Stephen John Bear	114	8.5	+1.1
Majority		844	63.0	
Turnout		1,340	26.3	−1.7
Liberal Democrats hold		Swing		

=== St Mark's ===
St Mark's
Party	Candidate	Votes	%	±%
Liberal Democrats	Sandra Jane Holliday*	880	62.5	+14.5
Conservative	Joseph Charles Grout	304	21.6	−8.8
Labour	Julie Frances Farmer	223	15.8	+5.9
Majority		576	40.9	
Turnout		1,407	29.5	−2.5
Liberal Democrats hold		Swing		

=== St Paul's ===
St Paul's
Party	Candidate	Votes	%	±%
Green	Tabi Joy	586	50.4	+27.5
Liberal Democrats	Jayjay Potter-Peachey	437	37.6	+4.1
Conservative	Susan Mary Godwin	139	12.0	−5.7
Majority		149	12.8	
Turnout		1,162	26.6	−2.4
Green gain from Liberal Democrats		Swing		

=== St Peter's ===
St Peter's
Party	Candidate	Votes	%	±%
Liberal Democrats	Victoria Mae Atherstone*	1,118	66.9	+14.4
Conservative	Rosemary Jaquine Baillie	365	21.9	−5.3
Labour	Clive Robert Harriss	187	11.2	+2.8
Majority		753	45.0	
Turnout		1,670	30.1	−2.9
Liberal Democrats hold		Swing		

=== Swindon Village ===
Swindon Village
Party	Candidate	Votes	%	±%
Liberal Democrats	Flo Clucas*	841	64.6	+16.3
Conservative	Edward Wadih Hazzan	319	24.5	−5.0
Green	Thomas Edward William Boden	142	10.9	−2.9
Majority		522	40.1	
Turnout		1,302	29.9	−5.1
Liberal Democrats hold		Swing		

=== Up Hatherley ===
Up Hatherley
Party	Candidate	Votes	%	±%
Liberal Democrats	Adrian Stephen Bamford	1,197	63.1	+15.8
Conservative	Roger Graham Fox	533	28.1	−11.1
Green	Samantha Diane Hodges	167	8.8	−0.8
Majority		664	35.0	
Turnout		1,897	45.7	−4.3
Liberal Democrats hold		Swing		

=== Warden Hill ===
Warden Hill
Party	Candidate	Votes	%	±%
Liberal Democrats	Graham Anthony Beale	1,088	57.1	+9.9
Conservative	Carl Leigh Jones	606	31.8	−9.6
Green	Tim Bonsor	149	7.8	±0.0
Labour	Ian Hugh White	61	3.2	−0.4
Majority		482	25.3	
Turnout		1,904	43.7	−4.3
Liberal Democrats hold		Swing		

== By-elections ==
=== Battledown ===
Battledown: 9 February 2023
Party	Candidate	Votes	%	±%
Liberal Democrats	Ed Chidley	877	52.0	+11.2
Conservative	Marcia Jacko	609	36.1	−10.3
Green	Ian Cameron	156	9.3	−3.5
Labour	Caroline Gavin	43	2.6	N/A
Majority		268	15.9	N/A
Turnout		1,685	35.4	−4.6
Liberal Democrats gain from Conservative		Swing	▲10.7	

=== Prestbury ===
Prestbury: 12 October 2023
Party	Candidate	Votes	%	±%
PAB	Stan Smith	644	37.2	−8.5
Green	Jan Foster	484	27.9	+9.6
Liberal Democrats	Ben Ingram	346	20.0	+5.4
Conservative	Laura Kennedy	258	14.9	−6.5
Majority		160	9.3	−15.0
Turnout		1,732	36.7	−7.9
PAB hold		Swing	▼9.0	
