= People Against Bureaucracy =

People Against Bureaucracy Group
- Abbreviation: PAB
- Leader: Stan Smith
- Founded: February 1976; 50 years ago
- Headquarters: 103 Linden Avenue, Prestbury, Cheltenham, GL52 3DT
- Ideology: Localism; Anti-bureaucracy; Green belt conservation Open government
- National affiliation: The Local Government Association Independent Group
- Colours: Black
- Cheltenham Borough Council: 1 / 40

Website
- www.pab.org.uk

People Against Bureaucracy (PAB) is a minor political party in Cheltenham, Gloucestershire. The party currently holds one seat on Cheltenham Borough Council: party leader Stan Smith representing the Prestbury ward. Following the 2024 local elections in Cheltenham, this remains PAB's only seat on the council, with the other represented parties being the Liberal Democrats, the Greens, and Reform UK.

The party is affiliated to The Local Government Association Independent Group.

== History ==
It was founded in 1976 to oppose development on green belt land and reduce council bureaucracy. It aimed to elect councillors to Tewkesbury Borough Council, later representing the same areas at Cheltenham Borough Council following council boundary changes.

=== District council ===
By the 2006 Cheltenham Borough Council election PAB held 5 seats. However, the party has seen a steady decline in popular vote share since that time, losing all but one of these council seats by 2024.

A by-election for the Prestbury ward was held in October 2023, after PAB councillor John Payne resigned. It was won by the party's candidate Stan Smith, although with an 8.5% drop in vote share.

In the 2024 Cheltenham Borough Council election the party lost one of its two seats on the council to the Green Party, leaving Stan Smith as the party's only remaining elected representative.

=== County council ===
At the 2009 Gloucestershire County Council election PAB held two seats in Cheltenham. One of these was then lost in the 2013 Gloucestershire County Council election. Finally, the remaining PAB seat was lost in the 2021 Gloucestershire County Council election to the Conservatives, due to not running any candidates.

== Principles ==
The stated principles of PAB are:

- The elimination of bureaucracy in local government
- Opposition to party politics in local government
- Making government more open by reducing activities done without press and public oversight
- Opposition to property development on green belt land
- Provide housing, employment and services for local people
- Preservation of the natural environment.

== See also ==
- Cheltenham Borough Council elections
- Gloucestershire County Council elections
