= Gloucestershire County Council elections =

Local government elections in Gloucestershire, England

Gloucestershire County Council in England is elected every four years. Since the last boundary changes in 2013 the council has comprised 53 councillors, each representing an electoral division. Elections are held every four years.

== Council elections ==
- 1973 Gloucestershire County Council election
- 1977 Gloucestershire County Council election
- 1981 Gloucestershire County Council election
- 1985 Gloucestershire County Council election
- 1989 Gloucestershire County Council election
- 1993 Gloucestershire County Council election
- 2001 Gloucestershire County Council election
- 2005 Gloucestershire County Council election
- 2009 Gloucestershire County Council election
- 2013 Gloucestershire County Council election (new division boundaries)
- 2017 Gloucestershire County Council election
- 2021 Gloucestershire County Council election
- 2025 Gloucestershire County Council election

== Council composition ==
Year	Conservative	Labour	Liberal Democrats (Note: Includes totals for the predecessors of the Liberal Democrats, the Liberal Party and SDP (both of which participated in the Alliance).)	Reform	Green	UKIP	Independents & Others	Council control after election
Local government reorganisation; council established (61 seats)
1973	30	18	5	–	–	–	8	No overall control
1977	46	3	0	–	0	–	12	Conservative
1981	25	17	11	–	0	–	8	No overall control
New division boundaries; seats increased from 61 to 63
1985	18	14	23	–	0	–	8	No overall control
1989	20	16	23	–	0	–	4	No overall control
1993	10	20	30	–	0	–	3	No overall control
1997	21	18	22	–	0	0	2	No overall control
2001	27	19	16	–	0	0	1	No overall control
2005	33	13	13	–	0	0	4	Conservative
2009	42	4	13	–	1	0	3 (Note: Including 2 People Against Bureaucracy)	Conservative
New division boundaries; seats decreased from 63 to 53
2013	23	9	14	–	1	3	3 (Note: Including 2 People Against Bureaucracy)	No overall control
2017	31	5	14	–	2	0	1 (Note: 1 People Against Bureaucracy)	Conservative
2021	28	5	16	0	4	0	0	Conservative
New division boundaries; seats increased from 53 to 55
2025	6	1	27	11	9	0	1	No overall control

== County result maps ==
2005 results map

2009 results map

2013 results map

2017 results map

2021 results map

2025 results map

== By-election results ==
=== 1993–1997 ===
Cotswold South By-Election 18 July 1996
Party	Candidate	Votes	%	±%
Liberal Democrats		1,064	80.0	
Labour		266	20.0	
Majority		798	60.0	
Turnout		1,370	16.0	
Liberal Democrats hold		Swing		

=== 1997–2001 ===
Barnwood By-Election 25 February 1999
Party	Candidate	Votes	%	±%
Conservative		1,274	44.0	+9.1
Liberal Democrats		982	33.9	+11.2
Labour		642	22.2	−20.2
Majority		292	10.1	
Turnout		2,898	24.0	
Conservative gain from Labour		Swing		

Cotswold North By-Election 10 February 2000
Party	Candidate	Votes	%	±%
Conservative		1,087	60.8	+13.6
Liberal Democrats		701	39.2	−3.4
Majority		386	21.6	
Turnout		1,788	37.9	
Conservative hold		Swing		

Leckhampton with Up Hatherley By-Election 24 February 2000
Party	Candidate	Votes	%	±%
Conservative		1,230	71.8	+31.3
Liberal Democrats		297	17.3	−28.5
Labour		186	10.9	−2.8
Majority		939	54.5	
Turnout		1,713	26.2	
Conservative gain from Liberal Democrats		Swing		

Hesters Way By-Election 4 May 2000
Party	Candidate	Votes	%	±%
Liberal Democrats		958	63.2	−2.0
Conservative		416	27.5	+5.8
Labour		141	9.3	−3.9
Majority		542	35.7	
Turnout		1,515	21.7	
Liberal Democrats hold		Swing		

Coleford By-Election 6 July 2000
Party	Candidate	Votes	%	±%
Liberal Democrats		922	46.6	
Labour		621	31.4	
Conservative		437	22.1	
Majority		301	15.2	
Turnout		1,980	22.5	
Liberal Democrats gain from Labour		Swing		

Dursley By-Election 30 November 2000
Party	Candidate	Votes	%	±%
Conservative		835	44.4	+20.1
Labour		694	36.9	+5.3
Liberal Democrats		350	18.6	−25.5
Majority		141	7.5	
Turnout		1,879	31.0	
Conservative gain from Liberal Democrats		Swing		

=== 2005–2009 ===
Lansdown, Park and Warden Hill By-Election 16 August 2007
Party	Candidate	Votes	%	±%
Conservative	Antonia Noble	2,208	52.3	−6.6
Liberal Democrats	Martin Dunne	1,605	38.0	+7.3
Labour	Brian Hughes	226	5.4	+6.6
Green	Janet Thomas	184	4.3	+7.3
Majority		603	14.3	
Turnout		4,223	30.0	
Conservative hold		Swing		

Brockworth By-Election 12 June 2008
Party	Candidate	Votes	%	±%
Liberal Democrats	Michael Collins	1,040	52.9	+41.0
Conservative	Ronald Furolo	751	38.2	+11.
Labour	Terry Haines	175	8.9	−15.9
Majority		289	14.7	
Turnout		1,966	31.4	
Liberal Democrats gain from Independent		Swing		

=== 2009–2013 ===
Rodborough By-Election 3 February 2011
Party	Candidate	Votes	%	±%
Labour	Brian Oosthuysen	793	31.7	+19.5
Conservative	Nigel Cooper	790	31.6	−3.7
Liberal Democrats	Christine Headley	660	26.4	−4.9
Green	Phil Blomberg	260	10.4	−10.7
Majority		3	0.1	
Turnout		2,503		
Labour gain from Conservative		Swing		

=== 2013–2017 ===
Mitcheldean By-Election 23 October 2014
Party	Candidate	Votes	%	±%
Conservative	Brian Robinson	959	38.4	+14.0
UKIP	Malcolm Berry	550	22.0	+2.7
Independent	Ian Whitburn	455	18.2	+18.2
Labour	Jackie Fraser	278	11.1	+0.7
Liberal Democrats	Sue Henchley	150	6.0	+0.3
Green	Ken Power	106	4.2	+0.4
Majority		409	16.4	
Turnout		2,498		
Conservative gain from Independent		Swing		

Churchdown By-Election 5 May 2016
Party	Candidate	Votes	%	±%
Liberal Democrats	Jack Williams	1,700	54.5	+5.8
Conservative	Graham Bocking	1,062	34.0	+4.4
Labour	Ed Buxton	359	11.5	−2.5
Majority		638	20.4	
Turnout		3,121		
Liberal Democrats hold		Swing		

=== 2017–2021 ===
Churchdown By-Election 2 May 2019
Party	Candidate	Votes	%	±%
Liberal Democrats	Benjamin Evans	1,405	47.8	−2.7
Conservative	Graham Bocking	811	27.6	−12.8
Independent	Dick Bishop	263	8.9	+8.9
Green	Cate Cody	249	8.5	+8.5
UKIP	Robert McCormick	213	7.2	+7.2
Majority		594	20.2	
Turnout		2,941		
Liberal Democrats hold		Swing		

=== 2021–2025 ===
Highnam By-Election 4 May 2023
Party	Candidate	Votes	%	±%
Conservative	Paul McLain	2,041	50.7	−15.5
Liberal Democrats	James Joyce	1,411	35.1	+24.0
Green	Jonathan Bristow	572	14.2	+2.2
Majority		630	15.7	
Turnout		4,024		
Conservative hold		Swing		

=== 2025–2029 ===
St Mark's and St Peter's By-Election 7 May 2026
Party	Candidate	Votes	%	±%
Liberal Democrats	Victoria Atherstone	1,607	43.6	–6.2
Reform	Warwick Ross	822	22.3	–2.7
Green	Jonathan Bristow	735	20.0	+11.0
Conservative	Risha Santilal	345	9.4	–0.5
Labour	Julie Farmer	158	4.3	–1.0
TUSC	Billy Jones	15	0.4	–0.6
Majority		785	21.3	–3.5
Turnout		3,703	38.37	
Registered electors		9,650		
Liberal Democrats hold		Swing		

Cirencester Park By-Election 2 July 2026
Party	Candidate	Votes	%	±%
Liberal Democrats	Andrea Pellegram	1,369	58.7	+6.6
Conservative	David Fowles	429	18.4	+2.9
Reform	Joe Day	366	15.7	–5.7
Green	Dylan Brook	111	4.8	–1.1
Labour	Joshua Littler-Jennings	59	2.5	–2.6
Majority		940	40.3	
Turnout		2,334		
Liberal Democrats hold		Swing		
