= 2025 Gloucestershire County Council election =

2025 English local election

- 1 May 2025

All 55 seats to Gloucestershire County Council 28 seats needed for a majority
	First party	Second party	Third party
Leader	Lisa Spivey	none	Cate Cody (retiring)
Party	Liberal Democrats	Reform	Green
Last election	16 seats, 24.8%	0 seats, 0.2%	4 seats, 13.0%
Seats before	16	1	4
Seats won	27	11	9
Seat change	▲11	▲10	▲5
Popular vote	49,565	45,904	27,110
Percentage	27.2%	25.2%	14.9%
Swing	▲2.4 pp	▲25.0 pp	▲1.9 pp
	Fourth party	Fifth party	Sixth party
Leader	Stephen Davies	John Bloxsom (defeated)	none
Party	Conservative	Labour	Independent
Last election	28 seats, 43.9%	5 seats, 15.4%	0 seat, 2.2%
Seats before	26	5	1
Seats won	6	1	1
Seat change	▼20	▼4	Steady
Popular vote	37,815	15,432	5,079
Percentage	20.8%	8.5%	2.8%
Swing	▼23.1 pp	▼6.9 pp	▲0.6 pp
- Winner of each seat at the 2025 Gloucestershire County Council election.
Leader before election
Stephen Davies
Conservative
No overall control
Leader after election
Lisa Spivey
Liberal Democrats
No overall control

The 2025 Gloucestershire County Council election took place on 1 May 2025 to elect members to Gloucestershire County Council in England. New boundaries applied and 55 seats were elected, two more than previously. This occurred on the same day as other local elections. The council was under no overall control prior to the election, being run by a Conservative minority administration. Following the election, the council remained under no overall control, but with the Liberal Democrats as the largest party. A minority Liberal Democrat administration subsequently formed to run the council.

== Background ==
In the 2021 election, the Conservatives won 28 seats, giving them a slim majority and control of the council. The Liberal Democrats were the second biggest party with 16 seats, followed by Labour with 5 seats and the Greens with 4 seats.

One by-election took place between the 2021 and 2025 elections:

Conservative

By-election
Division	Date	Incumbent	Winner	Cause	Ref.
Highnam	4 May 2023	Phil Awford	Paul McLain	Death	

In February 2022, councillor Alastair Chambers of Coney Hill and Matson left the Conservative Party following legal proceedings alleging he had breached the Animal Welfare Act, serving the rest of his term as an independent conservative. In May 2024, councillor Sue Williams of Bisley and Painswick left the Conservatives and joined the Green Party, citing disagreements on key policy positions such as the treatment of asylum seekers and the inaccessibility of the benefits system. Williams' resignation reduced the Conservatives to 26 seats and brought the council into no overall control. Williams rejoined the Conservatives in February 2025.

In the 2024 general election, the Conservatives lost all but one of their Gloucestershire seats, retaining North Cotswolds and losing five seats to Labour, who gained Forest of Dean, Gloucester and Stroud, and the Liberal Democrats, who gained Cheltenham and Tewkesbury as well as winning the new South Cotswolds seat. In October 2024, councillor Nick Housden of Stonehouse was suspended from the Conservative Party following undisclosed serious allegations against him, which he has denied. It was claimed that he had moved to the Netherlands, but in December, Housden refused to resign and stated that he was considering standing for election again, but that he was undecided where he would run and for what party.

The Local Government Boundary Commission for England began a review in 2023, since there was excessive variation in the number of electors per councillor. Their recommendations, which came into effect at the 2025 election, increased the number of councillors from 53 to 55 and changed the boundaries of 39 electoral divisions.

== Previous council composition ==
After 2021 election		Before 2025 election	
Party	Seats	Party	Seats
Conservative	28	Conservative	26
Liberal Democrats	16	Liberal Democrats	16
Labour	5	Labour	4
Green	4	Green	4
Independent	0	Independent	2
Vacant	N/A	Vacant	1

=== Changes ===
- February 2022: Alastair Chambers (Conservative) suspended from party (Note: Chambers sits as part of the Independent Conservative group, which is not registered as a political party.)
- March 2023: Phil Awford (Conservative) dies; by-election held May 2023
- May 2023: Paul McLain (Conservative) wins by-election
- May 2024: Sue Williams (Conservative) joins Green Party
- November 2024: Nicholas Housden (Conservative) suspended from party
- February 2025: Sue Williams (Green) re-joins Conservatives; David Drew (Labour) resigns – seat left vacant until 2025 election

== Summary ==
Prior to the election the council was under no overall control, being run by a Conservative minority administration led by Stephen Davies. The council remained under no overall control following the election, but with the Liberal Democrats becoming the largest party. The Conservatives were left with just six seats, falling back to be the fourth largest party on the council after the Liberal Democrats, Reform UK and the Green Party. A minority Liberal Democrat administration formed with informal support from Labour (whose only councillor was made chairman of the council) and the Greens. Liberal Democrat councillor Lisa Spivey was formally appointed as the new leader of the council at the subsequent annual council meeting on 21 May 2025.

=== Election result ===
2025 Gloucestershire County Council election
Party	Candidates	Seats	Gains	Losses	Net gain/loss	Seats %	Votes %	Votes	+/−
Liberal Democrats	55	27	11	0	▲11	49.1	27.2	49,565	+2.4
Reform	55	11	11	0	▲11	20.0	25.2	45,904	+25.0
Green	53	9	5	0	▲5	16.4	14.9	27,110	+1.9
Conservative	55	6	0	24	▼22	10.9	20.8	37,815	–23.1
Labour	55	1	0	4	▼4	1.8	8.5	15,432	–6.9
Independent	20	1	1	0	▲1	1.8	2.8	5,079	+0.6
Tewkesbury and Twyning Independents	1	0	0	0	Steady	0.0	0.4	785	N/A
TUSC	9	0	0	0	Steady	0.0	0.1	201	±0.0
CPA	1	0	0	0	Steady	0.0	<0.1	22	N/A
Socialist Labour	1	0	0	0	Steady	0.0	<0.1	30	N/A
Socialist (GB)	1	0	0	0	Steady	0.0	<0.1	25	N/A
Workers Party	1	0	0	0	Steady	0.0	<0.1	34	N/A

== Results by district ==
=== Cheltenham ===
==== District summary ====
Cheltenham district summary
Party	Seats	+/-	Votes	%	+/-
Liberal Democrats	9	▲3	14,831	44.9	+2.8
Reform UK	0	Steady	6,686	20.3	N/A
Conservative	0	▼4	6,672	20.2	–19.4
Green	1	▲1	3,451	10.5	–2.0
Labour	0	Steady	1,169	3.5	–2.4
Independent	0	Steady	110	0.3	N/A
TUSC	0	Steady	76	0.2	N/A
CPA	0	Steady	22	0.1	N/A
Total	10	Steady	33,017		

==== Division results ====
All Saints and Oakley
Party	Candidate	Votes	%	±%
Liberal Democrats	Colin Hay	1,250	48.2	
Reform	Maureen Dodwell	636	24.5	
Conservative	Georgina Bass	345	13.3	
Green	Naomi Seadon	235	9.1	
Labour	Diana Hale	126	4.9	
Majority				
Turnout		2,592		
Liberal Democrats hold		Swing		

Battledown and Charlton Kings
Party	Candidate	Votes	%	±%
Liberal Democrats	Angela Boyes	1,593	44.4	
Conservative	Matt Babbage	1,059	29.5	
Reform	Marcia Jacko	558	15.6	
Green	Adrian Becker	271	7.6	
Labour	Martin Glozier	104	2.9	
Majority				
Turnout		3,585		
Liberal Democrats gain from Conservative		Swing		

Benhall and Up Hatherley
Party	Candidate	Votes	%	±%
Liberal Democrats	Roger Whyborn	2,061	49.1	
Reform	Denise Jeffrey-Jones	1,011	24.1	
Conservative	Alan Davis	644	15.3	
Labour	Christopher Meehan	178	4.2	
Green	Dan Papworth	178	4.2	
Independent	Dan Collins	110	2.6	
TUSC	Christian Dwyer	18	0.4	
Majority				
Turnout		4,200		
Liberal Democrats hold		Swing		

Charlton Park and College
Party	Candidate	Votes	%	±%
Liberal Democrats	Iain Dobie	1,779	50.8	
Conservative	Rich Newman	795	22.7	
Reform	Ashley Mills	467	13.3	
Green	Stephen Vitkovitch	371	10.6	
Labour	Malcolm Bride	90	2.6	
Majority				
Turnout		3,502		
Liberal Democrats hold		Swing		

Hesters Way and Springbank
Party	Candidate	Votes	%	±%
Liberal Democrats	Suzanne Williams	987	41.3	
Reform	Iain Petrie	746	31.3	
Conservative	Jake Acock	307	12.9	
Green	Wendy Flynn	227	9.5	
Labour	Clive Harriss	84	3.5	
CPA	David Edgar	22	0.9	
TUSC	Joe Waters	14	0.6	
Majority				
Turnout		2,387		
Liberal Democrats hold		Swing		

Lansdown and Park
Party	Candidate	Votes	%	±%
Liberal Democrats	Glenn Andrews	1,466	41.4	
Conservative	Tim Harman	1,062	30.0	
Reform	Roland O'Rodhlann	559	15.8	
Green	Gary Clarke	345	9.7	
Labour	Kevin Boyle	113	3.2	
Majority				
Turnout		3,545		
Liberal Democrats gain from Conservative		Swing		

Leckhampton and Warden Hill
Party	Candidate	Votes	%	±%
Liberal Democrats	Martin Horwood	1,932	47.8	
Conservative	Emma Nelson	1,220	30.2	
Reform	Chris Donohoe	587	14.5	
Green	Nathan Weller	230	5.7	
Labour	Bronwen Goring	69	1.7	
Majority				
Turnout		4,038		
Liberal Democrats gain from Conservative		Swing		

Pittville and St Paul's
Party	Candidate	Votes	%	±%
Liberal Democrats	Julian Tooke	1,429	48.7	
Reform	Matt Podmore	557	19.0	
Conservative	Alex Traves	402	13.7	
Green	Ashleigh Davis	394	13.4	
Labour Co-op	Bobby Johnstone	135	4.6	
TUSC	Sam Coxson	17	0.6	
Majority				
Turnout		2,934		
Liberal Democrats gain from Conservative		Swing		

Prestbury and Swindon Village
Party	Candidate	Votes	%	±%
Green	Ian Cameron	944	27.8	
Liberal Democrats	Richard Lawler	921	27.1	
Reform	Warwick Ross	856	25.2	
Conservative	Pippa Mason	556	16.4	
Labour	Michael Farmer	120	3.5	
Majority				
Turnout		3,397		
Green gain from Conservative		Swing		

St Mark's and St Peter's
Party	Candidate	Votes	%	±%
Liberal Democrats	David Willingham	1,413	49.8	N/A
Reform	Andy Stinton	709	25.0	N/A
Conservative	Edward Hazzan	282	9.9	N/A
Green	Sarah Quekett	256	9.0	N/A
Labour	Julie Farmer	150	5.3	N/A
TUSC	Billy Jones	27	1.0	N/A
Majority				
Turnout		2,837		
Liberal Democrats hold		Swing		

=== Cotswold ===
==== District summary ====
Cotswolds district summary
Party	Seats	+/-	Votes	%	+/-
Liberal Democrats	5	▲1	10,903	38.9	+2.2
Conservative	3	▼1	8,509	30.4	–16.7
Reform UK	0	Steady	5,928	21.1	+19.7
Green	0	Steady	1,913	6.8	–1.2
Labour	0	Steady	781	2.8	–3.6
Total	8	Steady	28,034		

==== Division results ====
Bourton-on-the-Water and Northleach
Party	Candidate	Votes	%	±%
Liberal Democrats	Paul Hodgkinson	2,063	55.8	±0
Conservative	Madan Samuel	826	22.3	−10
Reform	Matt Backhouse	748	20.2	+20.2
Labour	Andrew Robert McCulloch	60	1.6	−4.7
Majority		1,237	33	+9
Turnout		3,697	40.67	−3.02
Liberal Democrats hold		Swing	0	

Campden-Vale
Party	Candidate	Votes	%	±%
Conservative	Tom Bradley	1,549	39.9	−23
Reform	Philip Nickson	916	23.6	+14
Green	Clare Victoria Turner	875	22.5	+2
Liberal Democrats	Rupert Potter	452	11.6	N/A
Labour	Annis May Timpson	95	2.4	−6
Majority		633	16	−27
Turnout		3,887	41.89	−1.31
Conservative hold		Swing		

Cirencester North with Ermin
Party	Candidate	Votes	%	±%
Liberal Democrats	Mark Harris	1,574	44.8	N/A
Reform	Jill Rixon	870	24.8	N/A
Conservative	David Fowles	782	22.3	N/A
Green	Tony Cima	173	4.9	N/A
Labour	Glenn McPeak	112	3.2	N/A
Majority		704	20	N/A
Turnout		3,511	38.14	N/A
Liberal Democrats win (new seat)				

Cirencester Park
Party	Candidate	Votes	%	±%
Liberal Democrats	Joe Harris	1,546	52.1	−2
Reform	Mackenzie Jayne Vaughan	635	21.4	N/A
Conservative	Jackie Tarleton	460	15.5	−18
Green	Bob Irving	176	5.9	−1
Labour	Andy Farmer	151	5.1	−1
Majority		911	31	+10
Turnout		2,968		
Liberal Democrats hold		Swing		

Fairford and Lechlade on Thames
Party	Candidate	Votes	%	±%
Conservative	Dom Morris	1,433	40.0	−19
Liberal Democrats	Tristan Wilkinson	1,250	34.9	+1
Reform	Johnno Hummel	646	18.0	N/A
Green	Katya Lee-Browne	161	4.5	N/A
Labour	Abbie Wells	92	2.6	−4
Majority		183	5	−20
Turnout		3,582	41.40	−3.80
Conservative hold		Swing	-	

Moreton, Stow & the Rissingtons
Party	Candidate	Votes	%	±%
Conservative	Daryl Corps	1,293	36.8	N/A
Liberal Democrats	Craig Thurling	1,104	31.4	N/A
Reform	Julian Douglas Painter	803	22.8	N/A
Green	Bob Eastoe	226	6.4	N/A
Labour	Paula Hogard	92	2.6	N/A
Majority		189	6	N/A
Turnout		3,518	36.68	N/A
Conservative win (new seat)				

South Cerney
Party	Candidate	Votes	%	±%
Liberal Democrats	Lisa Spivey	1,668	47.3	−4
Conservative	Rachel Roffe	951	27.0	−16
Reform	Richard Latham	719	20.4	+18
Green	Lucy Elizabeth Schlappa	120	3.4	N/A
Labour	Josh Littler-Jennings	69	2.0	−2
Majority		717	20	+12
Turnout		3,527	39.59	−8.79
Liberal Democrats hold		Swing	-	

Tetbury
Party	Candidate	Votes	%	±%
Liberal Democrats	Ian Watson	1,246	37.3	N/A
Conservative	Stephan Alexander Fifield	1,215	36.3	−20
Reform	Elizabeth Nagle	591	17.7	N/A
Green	Michael Graeme Wagner	182	5.4	−27
Labour	Julie Marie Harper	110	3.3	−8
Majority		31	1	−23
Turnout		3,344	39.89	−1.27
Liberal Democrats gain from Conservative		Swing	-	

=== Forest of Dean ===
==== District summary ====
Forest of Dean district summary
Party	Seats	+/-	Votes	%	+/-
Reform UK	5	▲5	8,312	33.0	N/A
Green	2	Steady	5,582	22.1	+1.5
Conservative	0	▼4	4,474	17.7	–24.0
Labour	0	▼1	2,421	9.6	–7.6
Liberal Democrats	1	Steady	2,342	9.3	+1.0
Independent	0	Steady	2,079	8.2	–3.3
Total	8	Steady	25,210		

==== Division results ====
Blakeney and Bream
Party	Candidate	Votes	%	±%
Green	Beki Hoyland	1,501	40.0	+6
Reform	Simon Edward Charles Wendland	1,177	31.4	N/A
Conservative	Richard Scott Thomas	611	16.3	−18
Labour	Jacob Edward Sanders	274	7.3	−9
Liberal Democrats	Peter Andrew James Taylor	191	5.1	N/A
Majority		324	9	+9
Turnout		3,754	39.91	−2.09
Green hold		Swing	-	

Cinderford
Party	Candidate	Votes	%	±%
Reform	Ray Donaghue	1,081	43.8	N/A
Labour	Graham Morgan	679	27.5	−24
Green	Alison Bruce	281	11.4	−1
Conservative	Jonathan Edward Beeston	270	10.9	−22
Liberal Democrats	Stewart John Bean	159	6.4	+3
Majority		402	17	−1
Turnout		2,470	30.22	+3.22
Reform gain from Labour		Swing	-	

Coleford
Party	Candidate	Votes	%	±%
Reform	Leigh Jayne Challis	1,002	35.6	N/A
Conservative	Carole Ann Allaway-Martin	535	19.0	−25
Green	David Andrew John Wheeler	440	15.6	N/A
Independent	Ian Richard Whitburn	314	11.2	−13
Labour	Ruth Hampson Kyne	264	9.4	−17
Liberal Democrats	Chloe Rees	260	9.2	+3
Majority		467	17	−1
Turnout		2,815	32.13	+1.13
Reform gain from Conservative		Swing	-	

Drybrook and Lydbrook
Party	Candidate	Votes	%	±%
Reform	Piers Camp	1,088	36.4	N/A
Conservative	Terry Hale	555	18.6	−14
Labour Co-op	Di Martin	451	15.1	−10
Green	Stephen James Yeates	388	13.0	±0
Independent	Thom Forester	381	12.7	−13
Liberal Democrats	Susan Warren	127	4.2	+2
Majority		533	17	+10
Turnout		2,990	36.06	−1.94
Reform gain from Conservative		Swing	-	

Lydney
Party	Candidate	Votes	%	±%
Reform	Mark Howard	1,104	34.4	N/A
Green	Johnathan Lane	917	28.6	+14
Conservative	Alan Preest	780	24.3	−30
Labour	Daniel Richard Furmage	275	8.6	−11
Liberal Democrats	Sarah Gillie	134	4.2	−1
Majority		187	5	−29
Turnout		3,210	35.32	+1.32
Reform gain from Conservative		Swing	-	

Mitcheldean
Party	Candidate	Votes	%	±%
Reform	Stuart Graham	1,050	31.8	N/A
Independent	Philip Howard Joseph Burford	850	25.7	N/A
Conservative	Julie Kirkham	535	16.2	−32
Liberal Democrats	James Michael Joyce	329	10.0	N/A
Green	Merlin Healey	316	9.6	−2
Labour	Joanne Penelope Kaye	224	6.8	−9
Majority		200	6	−19
Turnout		3,304	38.39	−2.61
Reform gain from Conservative		Swing	-	

Newent
Party	Candidate	Votes	%	±%
Liberal Democrats	Gill Moseley	920	27.3	−24
Reform	Angela Gaskell	887	26.3	N/A
Conservative	Clayton Williams	696	20.6	−28
Independent	Julia Denise Gooch	534	15.8	N/A
Green	Joanna Coull	237	7.0	N/A
Labour	Lynda Waltho	97	2.9	N/A
Majority		43	1	−1
Turnout		3,371	36.82	−1.18
Liberal Democrats hold		Swing	-	

Sedbury
Party	Candidate	Votes	%	±%
Green	Chris McFarling	1,502	45.6	−15
Reform	Gill Higgs	923	28.0	N/A
Conservative	Graham Stanley Drew	492	14.9	−24
Liberal Democrats	Thomas Michael Allan	222	6.7	N/A
Labour	Andrew Richard Hewlett	157	4.8	N/A
Majority		579	18	−4
Turnout		3,296	40.15	−6.85
Green hold		Swing	-	

=== Gloucester ===
==== District summary ====
Gloucester district summary
Party	Seats	+/-	Votes	%	+/-
Reform UK	3	▲3	8,263	28.3	N/A
Liberal Democrats	4	▲2	7,721	26.5	+2.8
Conservative	2	▼6	6,880	23.6	–24.7
Labour	0	Steady	3,313	11.4	–8.5
Green	0	Steady	1,551	5.3	+1.6
Independent	1	▲1	1,325	4.5	+0.6
TUSC	0	Steady	67	0.2	+0.1
Workers Party	0	Steady	34	0.1	N/A
Socialist Labour	0	Steady	30	0.1	N/A
Total	10	Steady	29,184		

==== Division results ====
Abbey
Party	Candidate	Votes	%	±%
Conservative	Andrew Gravells	1,312	38.5	
Reform	Fred Ramsey	975	28.6	
Liberal Democrats	Adam Gatier	687	20.2	
Labour	Stephen Ekenechukwu Nwachukwu	232	6.8	
Green	Adam Shearing	172	5.1	
Independent	Maddy Vizard	27	0.8	
Majority				
Turnout		3,405		
Conservative hold		Swing		

Barnwood and Hucclecote
Party	Candidate	Votes	%	±%
Liberal Democrats	Ashley James Bowkett	1,528	38.7	−12
Reform	Dave Limbrick	1,112	28.2	N/A
Conservative	Andrew Gilbert Miller	796	20.2	−13
Labour	Anne Whitworth	267	6.8	−2
Green	Emma Clifford	197	5.0	N/A
Independent	Matthew Randolph	34	0.9	N/A
Independent	Jason Paul Mills	16	0.4	N/A
Majority		416	11	−7
Turnout		3,950	39.25	−6.88
Liberal Democrats hold		Swing	-	

Barton and Tredworth
Party	Candidate	Votes	%	±%
Conservative	Sajid Patel	855	35.9	−18
Liberal Democrats	Usman Gani Bhaimia	504	21.2	+16
Labour	Richard Steven Flower	382	16.1	−20
Reform	Simon Collins	331	13.9	N/A
Green	Matthew Phypers	143	6.0	N/A
Independent	Robert Myatt	138	5.8	N/A
TUSC	Susan Powell	26	1.1	N/A
Majority		351	15	−3
Turnout		2,379	25.38	−11.91
Conservative hold		Swing	-	

Coney Hill and Matson
Party	Candidate	Votes	%	±%
Independent	Alastair Chambers	798	36.2	N/A
Reform	Michael Carl Bones	637	28.9	N/A
Labour	Jen Cole	335	15.2	−12
Conservative	Ela Kubaszczyk	227	10.3	−41
Liberal Democrats	Daniel Courtney	170	7.7	−1
Socialist Labour	Kazol Ahmed	30	1.4	N/A
TUSC	James Collett	10	0.5	−1
Majority		161	7	−17
Turnout		2,207	24.85	−5.10
Independent gain from Conservative		Swing	-	

Grange and Kingsway
Party	Candidate	Votes	%	±%
Reform	Jason Preece	1,090	37.4	N/A
Conservative	Jaro Kubaszczyk	701	24.1	−33
Labour	Alison Louise Gregory	577	19.8	−3
Liberal Democrats	Daniel Nicholson Murch	220	7.6	+3
Green	Anthony Victor Bergonzi	205	7.0	−1
Independent	Andy Bell	120	4.1	N/A
Majority		389	13	−21
Turnout		2,913	26.85	−3.55
Reform gain from Conservative		Swing	-	

Hempsted and Westgate
Party	Candidate	Votes	%	±%
Liberal Democrats	Rebecca Trimnell	735	29.7	+7
Conservative	Pamela Elizabeth Tracey	602	24.3	−18
Reform	Daniel Joseph Woolf	594	24.0	N/A
Labour	Jag Thangella	319	12.9	−12
Green	Deborah Oldham	149	6.0	−1
Independent	Brendon O'Donnell	40	1.6	N/A
Workers Party	Steve Gower	34	1.4	N/A
Majority		133	6	−11
Turnout		2,473	28.61	−6.69
Liberal Democrats gain from Conservative		Swing	-	

Kingsholm and Wotton
Party	Candidate	Votes	%	±%
Liberal Democrats	Jeremy Eric Hilton	1,326	45.1	−5
Reform	Stuart Leigh Williams	647	22.0	N/A
Conservative	Kofi Kumi-Addo	410	13.9	−11
Labour	Karen Judith Clarke	297	10.1	−6
Green	Teresa Pollington	194	6.6	+1
Independent	John McStay	37	1.3	−1
TUSC	John Samuel Harrison	31	1.1	N/A
Majority		679	23	−2
Turnout		2,942	31.58	−6.88
Liberal Democrats hold		Swing	-	

Longlevens
Party	Candidate	Votes	%	±%
Liberal Democrats	Sarah Dawn Sawyer	1,334	40.9	+8
Reform	Ian Ankers	1,023	31.4	N/A
Conservative	Suresh Arava	602	18.5	−34
Labour	Valerie Simms	126	3.9	−7
Green	Paul Stroud	121	3.7	N/A
Independent	Tom Grant	53	1.6	N/A
Majority		311	10	−9
Turnout		3,259	39.63	−3.47
Liberal Democrats gain from Conservative		Swing	-	

Quedgeley
Party	Candidate	Votes	%	±%
Reform	Chris Mayo	883	32.6	N/A
Conservative	David Foley Norman	727	26.8	−23
Liberal Democrats	Trevor Duncan Howard	721	26.6	+5
Labour Co-op	Karen Louise James	224	8.3	−6
Green	Mark Rowney	157	5.8	N/A
Majority		156	6	−25
Turnout		2,712	31.16	−4.13
Reform gain from Conservative		Swing	-	

Tuffley and Moreland
Party	Candidate	Votes	%	±%
Reform	Vernon John Gray	971	33.0	
Conservative	Paula Lorraine Dee	648	22.0	
Labour	Kevin Ernest Stephens	554	18.8	
Liberal Democrats	Richard Price	496	16.8	
Green	Barbara Russell	213	7.2	
Independent	Byron Clifford Davis	62	2.1	
Majority				
Turnout		2,944		
Reform win (new seat)				

=== Stroud ===
==== District summary ====
Stroud district summary
Party	Seats	+/-	Votes	%	+/-
Green	6	▲5	12,152	31.1	+10.4
Reform UK	2	▲2	8,785	22.5	N/A
Labour	1	▼3	6,878	17.6	–10.8
Conservative	1	▼3	6,570	16.8	–24.3
Liberal Democrats	1	Steady	3,727	9.5	+1.5
Independent	0	Steady	927	2.4	+1.5
TUSC	0	Steady	58	0.1	±0.0
Socialist (GB)	0	Steady	25	0.1	N/A
Total	11	▲1	39,122		

==== Division results ====
Bisley and Painswick
Party	Candidate	Votes	%	±%
Green	Gary Luff	1,753	45.5	+6
Conservative	Susan Williams	991	25.7	−21
Reform	Chas Fallows	743	19.3	N/A
Labour	Alex Hughes	230	6.0	−8
Liberal Democrats	Guy Fancourt	137	3.6	N/A
Majority		762	19	+11
Turnout		3,854	45.86	−6.14
Green gain from Conservative		Swing	-	

Cam Valley
Party	Candidate	Votes	%	±%
Reform	Michael Alun Rees	1,111	30.3	N/A
Conservative	Lindsey Jane Green	745	20.3	−35
Labour	Terry Cook	726	19.8	−8
Independent	Brian Tipper	480	13.1	N/A
Green	Liz Hilary	366	10.0	+1
Liberal Democrats	Nick Easby	236	6.4	−2
Majority		366	10	−17
Turnout		3,664	36.84	−5.16
Reform gain from Conservative		Swing	-	

Dursley
Party	Candidate	Votes	%	±%
Green	Richard Dean	970	25.8	N/A
Reform	Jonathan Wren	926	24.6	N/A
Labour	Anna Mainwaring	841	22.4	−28
Conservative	Loraine Vivienne Patrick	768	20.4	−30
Liberal Democrats	Richard Christopher Wilsher	254	6.8	N/A
Majority		44	1	+1
Turnout		3,759	40.07	−4.93
Green gain from Labour		Swing	-	

Hardwicke and Severn
Party	Candidate	Votes	%	±%
Conservative	Stephen Frank Davies	1,113	34.5	
Reform	Luke Parry	989	30.7	
Liberal Democrats	Mike Stayte	428	13.3	
Labour	Simon MacGregor	375	11.6	
Green	Kerri Anna Tyler	321	10.0	
Majority		124	3.8	−33
Turnout		3,226	35.6	
Registered electors		9,086		
Conservative hold		Swing		

Haresfield and Upton St Leonards
Party	Candidate	Votes	%	±%
Green	John Graham Patient	916	38.3	
Reform	Chris Lester	627	26.2	
Conservative	Demelza Jane Rachel Turner-Wilkes	527	22.1	
Labour	Lesley Williams	180	7.5	
Liberal Democrats	Tom Moseley	118	4.9	
No description	Deborah Jeanette Harwood	22	0.9	
Majority		289	12.1	
Turnout		2,390	34.4	
Registered electors		6,955		
Green win (new seat)				

Minchinhampton
Party	Candidate	Votes	%	±%
Green	Chloe Isobel Turner	2,199	60.5	
Reform	John Lee Marsden	622	17.1	
Conservative	Bella Amory	444	12.2	
Labour	David James Carter	236	6.5	
Liberal Democrats	Adam Giles Crispin Cain	131	3.6	
Majority		1,577	43.4	+19
Turnout		3,632	46.1	
Registered electors		7,892		
Green hold		Swing		

Nailsworth
Party	Candidate	Votes	%	±%
Labour Co-op	Steve Robinson	1,675	40.1	
Green	Gill Thomas	1,210	28.9	
Reform	Simon Craig Green	695	16.6	
Conservative	Max Oliver John Howells	471	11.3	
Liberal Democrats	Colleen Angela Rothwell	130	3.1	
Majority		465	11.1	−6
Turnout		4,181	45.6	
Registered electors		9,207		
Labour Co-op hold		Swing		

Rodborough
Party	Candidate	Votes	%	±%
Green	Craig Alan Horrocks	1,150	31.3	
Labour Co-op	John Bloxsom	1,138	31.0	
Reform	Gary Keating	850	23.2	
Conservative	Sharon Elizabeth Sugars	352	9.6	
Liberal Democrats	Juliette Louise Ttofa	172	4.7	
Majority		12	0.3	
Turnout		3,662	37.4	
Registered electors		9,807		
Green gain from Labour Co-op		Swing		

Stonehouse
Party	Candidate	Votes	%	±%
Reform	Dean Raymond Luke Botterill	825	27.4	
Green	Tom Jarman	804	26.7	
Labour	Karen Linforth	486	16.1	
Independent	Nick Housden	425	14.1	
Conservative	Christopher John Easton	345	11.4	
Liberal Democrats	Richard Paul Osborn	122	4.0	
TUSC	Adam Goulcher	9	0.3	
Majority		21	0.7	
Turnout		3,016	33.7	
Registered electors		8,975		
Reform gain from Conservative		Swing		

Stroud Central
Party	Candidate	Votes	%	±%
Green	Natalie Rothwell-Warn	2,166	51.1	
Labour	Shelley Rider	799	18.8	
Reform	Daryl Leslie Arthur Smith	697	16.4	
Conservative	Hena Mannan-Rahman	309	7.3	
Liberal Democrats	George William James	195	4.6	
TUSC	Chris Moore	49	1.2	
Socialist (GB)	Piers Hobson	25	0.6	
Majority		1,367	32.2	+21
Turnout		4,240	40.3	
Registered electors		10,574		
Green gain from Labour		Swing		

Wotton-under-Edge
Party	Candidate	Votes	%	±%
Liberal Democrats	Linda Janet Cohen	1,804	51.6	
Reform	Darren Paul Kirkpatrick	700	20.0	
Conservative	Graham Steven Smith	505	14.4	
Green	Susan Lesley Fenton	297	8.5	
Labour	Stephen Richard MacKay	192	5.5	
Majority		1,104	31.6	+29
Turnout		3,498	40.3	
Registered electors		8,690		
Liberal Democrats hold		Swing		

=== Tewkesbury ===
==== District summary ====
Tewkesbury district summary
Party	Seats	+/-	Votes	%	+/-
Liberal Democrats	7	▲5	10,041	36.6	+6.0
Reform UK	1	▲1	7,930	28.9	N/A
Conservative	0	▼4	4,710	17.2	–30.2
Green	0	▼1	2,461	9.0	–2.1
Labour	0	Steady	870	3.2	–7.4
TTI	0	Steady	785	2.9	N/A
Independent	0	Steady	638	2.3	N/A
Total	8	▲1	27,444		

==== Division results ====
Bishop's Cleeve
Party	Candidate	Votes	%	±%
Liberal Democrats	Alex Hegenbarth	1,817	56.4	
Reform	Robert Anthony Bird	900	27.9	
Conservative	Charles Simon Calder	299	9.3	
Green	Nicky Williams	112	3.5	
Labour	Antony John Davies	93	2.9	
Majority		917	28.5	
Turnout		3,221	37.5	
Registered electors		8,599		
Liberal Democrats hold		Swing		

Brockworth
Party	Candidate	Votes	%	±%
Liberal Democrats	Ben Evans	1,067	35.9	
Reform	Haydn Pearl	769	25.9	
No description	Craig Lee John Carter	591	19.9	
Conservative	Phil Surman	321	10.8	
Green	Helen Joyce Dendulk	123	4.1	
Labour	David Denham	100	3.4	
Majority		298	10.0	
Turnout		2,971	29.1	
Registered electors		10,212		
Liberal Democrats gain from Conservative		Swing		

Churchdown
Party	Candidate	Votes	%	±%
Liberal Democrats	Stewart Richard Dove	1,523	47.7	
Reform	Julie Evans	972	30.4	
Conservative	Gill Blackwell	451	14.1	
Green	Lindsay Jane Martin	135	4.2	
Labour	Veronica Davies	115	3.6	
Majority		551	17.2	
Turnout		3,196	36.4	
Registered electors		8,795		
Liberal Democrats hold		Swing		

Highnam
Party	Candidate	Votes	%	±%
Liberal Democrats	Sarah Jane Hands	1,074	32.4	
Reform	Graham John Bocking	1,063	32.1	
Conservative	Paul Dermot McLain	876	26.4	
Green	Jonathan Richard Bristow	157	4.7	
Labour	Annie Lapington	145	4.4	
Majority		11	0.3	
Turnout		3,315	35.8	
Registered electors		9,281		
Liberal Democrats gain from Conservative		Swing		

Severn Vale
Party	Candidate	Votes	%	±%
Liberal Democrats	Richard John Stanley	1,680	44.4	
Reform	Mark John Riches	1,019	26.9	
Conservative	Robert John Edward Vines	737	19.5	
Green	Rachael Louise Bartlett	214	5.7	
Labour	Eileen Greaves	88	2.3	
No description	Charlotte Emily Mills	47	1.2	
Majority		661	17.5	
Turnout		3,785	37.9	
Registered electors		10,009		
Liberal Democrats win (new seat)				

Tewkesbury East
Party	Candidate	Votes	%	±%
Liberal Democrats	Kate Usmar	846	32.5	
Reform	Steve Curwen	837	32.2	
Conservative	Ian Stewart Thomson	425	16.3	
Green	Hilarie Jane Bowman	366	14.1	
Labour	Emma Ash	126	4.8	
Majority		9	0.3	
Turnout		2,600	31.6	
Registered electors		8,241		
Liberal Democrats gain from Conservative		Swing		

Tewkesbury West
Party	Candidate	Votes	%	±%
Reform	Vernon Dennis Smith	1,225	31.6	
Green	Matt Dimond-Brown	1,025	26.4	
TTI	Mike Sztymiak	785	20.2	
Liberal Democrats	Ola Kareem	448	11.5	
Conservative	John William Murphy	288	7.4	
Labour	Joe Jones	110	2.8	
Majority		200	5.2	
Turnout		3,881	40.3	
Registered electors		9,635		
Reform win (new seat)				

Winchcombe and Woodmancote
Party	Candidate	Votes	%	±%
Liberal Democrats	Cheryl Agg	1,586	35.4	
Conservative	David William Gray	1,322	29.5	
Reform	Darren James Tarling	1,145	25.6	
Green	Stuart Martin Galey	329	7.4	
Labour	Stephen Leslie Lydon	93	2.1	
Majority		264	5.9	
Turnout		4,475	44.3	
Registered electors		10,125		
Liberal Democrats gain from Conservative		Swing		

== By-elections between 2025 and 2029 ==
=== St Mark's and St Peter's ===
St Mark's and St Peter's By-Election 7 May 2026
Party	Candidate	Votes	%	±%
Liberal Democrats	Victoria Atherstone	1,607	43.6	−6.2
Reform	Warwick Ross	822	22.3	−2.7
Green	Bowie Johnstone	735	20.0	+11.0
Conservative	Risha Santilal	345	9.4	−0.5
Labour	Julie Farmer	158	4.3	−1.0
TUSC	Billy Jones	15	0.4	−0.6
Majority		785	21.3	−3.5
Turnout		3,703	38.4	
Registered electors		9,650		
Liberal Democrats hold		Swing		

=== Cirencester Park ===
Cirencester Park
Party	Candidate	Votes	%	±%
Liberal Democrats	Andrea Pellegram	1,369	58.7	+6.6
Conservative	John Fowles	429	18.4	+2.9
Reform	Joseph Day	366	15.7	−5.7
Green	Dylan Brook	111	4.8	−1.1
Labour	Joshua Littler-Jennings	59	2.5	−2.6
Majority		940	40.3	
Turnout		2,340	28.48	
Liberal Democrats hold		Swing		

== See also ==
- Gloucestershire County Council elections
