= 2017 Gloucestershire County Council election =

2017 UK local government election

← 2013	4 May 2017	2021 →

All 53 seats to Gloucestershire County Council 27 seats needed for a majority
	First party	Second party	Third party
	Con	LD	Lab
Party	Conservative	Liberal Democrats	Labour
Last election	23	14	9
Seats before	25	14	9
Seats won	31	14	5
Seat change	▲8	Steady	▼4
	Fourth party	Fifth party
	Grn	PAB
Party	Green	PAB
Last election	1	1
Seats before	1	1
Seats won	2	1
Seat change	▲1	Steady
- Map showing the results of the 2017 Gloucestershire County Council elections.
Council control before election
No Overall Control
Council control after election
Conservative

The 2017 Gloucestershire County Council election took place on 4 May 2017 as part of the 2017 local elections in the United Kingdom. All 53 councillors were elected from electoral divisions which returned one county councillor each by first-past-the-post voting for a four-year term of office. Control of the council went from a Conservative Party minority to a majority administration.

All locally registered electors (British, Irish, Commonwealth and European Union citizens) who were aged 18 or over on Thursday 4 May 2017 were entitled to vote in the local elections. Those who were temporarily away from their ordinary address (for example, away working, on holiday, in student accommodation or in hospital) were also entitled to vote in the local elections, although those who had moved abroad and registered as overseas electors cannot vote in the local elections. It is possible to register to vote at more than one address (such as a university student who had a term-time address and lives at home during holidays) at the discretion of the local Electoral Register Office, but it remains an offence to vote more than once in the same local government election.

== Summary ==
The Conservative Party gained nine seats and lost one, leading to a net gain of eight seats. The Liberal Democrats held all their existing seats, remaining the second largest party by total seats and percentage vote, whilst the Labour Party lost four seats. UKIP lost all its seats on the council, whilst the Greens gained a second councillor.

The sole remaining independent lost re-election, although the People Against Bureaucracy Group held on to their seat.

== Results ==
Gloucestershire County Council election, 2017
Party	Seats	Gains	Losses	Net gain/loss	Seats %	Votes %	Votes	+/−
Conservative	31	10	2	+8	58.5	45.1	79,759	
Liberal Democrats	14	0	0	0	26.4	27.4	48,462	
Labour	5	1	5	-4	9.4	14.4	25,541	
Green	2	1	0	+1	3.8	7.7	13,556	
PAB	1	0	0	0	1.9		1525	
UKIP	0	0	3	-3	0	3.2	5,631	
Other parties	0	0	2	-2	0	2.2	3,907	

== Results by Division ==
=== Cheltenham ===
All Saints and Oakley
Party	Candidate	Votes	%	±%
Liberal Democrats	Colin Hay	1,440	53	+3
Conservative	Martin Andrew Tracey	844	31	+7
Labour	Alec Gamble	271	10	−4
Green	Sarah Jane Field	186	7	−5
Majority		596	22	−4
Liberal Democrats hold		Swing		

Battledown and Charlton Kings
Party	Candidate	Votes	%	±%
Conservative	Matt Babbage	1,845	46	+10
Liberal Democrats	Paul Gerard McCloskey	1,794	45	+10
Green	Lorraine Elizabeth Mason	180	5	0
Labour	Caroline Adele Gavin	170	5	−1
Majority		51	1	0
Conservative hold		Swing		

Benhall and Up Hatherley
Party	Candidate	Votes	%	±%
Liberal Democrats	Simon Wheeler	1,972	52	+11
Conservative	Mike Saunders	1506	40	+13
Labour	Kenneth Syme	159	4	0
Green	Adam Paul Van Coevorden	147	4	0
Majority		466	12	−2
Liberal Democrats hold		Swing		

Charlton Park and College
Party	Candidate	Votes	%	±%
Liberal Democrats	Klara Sudbury	2,392	61	+14
Conservative	Peter Frantz Vagn Christensen	1,263	32	−4
Green	Elizabeth Johnson	143	4	+4
Labour	Malcolm Bride	136	3	−3
Majority		1129	29	+18
Liberal Democrats hold		Swing		

Hesters Way and Springbank
Party	Candidate	Votes	%	±%
Liberal Democrats	Suzanne Theresa Williams	1,421	54	−1
Conservative	Shaun Stephen Bailey	781	30	+7
Labour	Clive Robert Harriss	203	8	−8
UKIP	Barry George Lodge	125	5	+5
Green	Dale Karl Campbell	86	3	+3
Majority		640	24	−6
Liberal Democrats hold		Swing		

Lansdown and Park
Party	Candidate	Votes	%	±%
Conservative	Tim Harman	1,921	50	+4
Liberal Democrats	Dilys Mary Juliet Barrell	1,620	42	+14
Labour	Kevin Michael Boyle	160	4	−2
Green	Anne Knight-Elliott	143	4	−3
Majority		301	8	−10
Conservative hold		Swing		

Leckhampton and Warden Hill
Party	Candidate	Votes	%	±%
Liberal Democrats	Iain Andrew Paterson Dobie	2,128	49	+15
Conservative	Chris Nelson	1,902	43	+10
Green	Timothy Cosmo Bonsor	188	4	−7
Labour	Joe Sucksmith	165	4	+4
Majority		226	6	+5
Liberal Democrats hold		Swing		

Pittville and Prestbury
Party	Candidate	Votes	%	±%
PAB	John Payne	1,525	38	−21
Liberal Democrats	Dennis Frank Parsons	1,402	35	+20
Conservative	Jerry Forrest	846	21	+5
Labour	Ian Hugh White	140	3	+3
Green	Ian Antony Lander	120	3	+3
Majority		123	3	−40
PAB hold		Swing		

St Mark's and St Peter's
Party	Candidate	Votes	%	±%
Liberal Democrats	Christopher Francis Coleman	1,814	59	+15
Conservative	Carney Charles Bonner	704	23	+9
Labour	Robert Ramuz Irons	233	8	−2
Green	Emily Catherine Campbell	201	7	+1
UKIP	Peter Bowman	107	3	−24
Majority		1,110	36	+19
Liberal Democrats hold		Swing		

St Paul's and Swindon
Party	Candidate	Votes	%	±%
Liberal Democrats	Bernard Fisher	1,175	50	+6
Conservative	Christopher John Daniels	564	24	+10
Labour	Charles Francis Fraser	424	18	+8
Green	Adrian Becker	169	7	+1
Majority		611	26	+9
Liberal Democrats hold		Swing		

=== Cotswold ===
Bourton-on-the-Water and Northleach
Party	Candidate	Votes	%	±%
Liberal Democrats	Paul Hodgkinson	2,365	60	+21
Conservative	Mark Mackenzie-Charrington	1,581	40	+3
Majority		784	20	+18
Liberal Democrats hold		Swing		

Campden-Vale
Party	Candidate	Votes	%	±%
Conservative	Lynden Stow	2,145	68	+6
Liberal Democrats	Bella McMillan-Scott	721	23	+9
Green	Ailsa Spindler	173	5	+5
UKIP	Robert McNeil Wilson	109	3	−13
Majority		1,424	45	−1
Conservative hold		Swing		

Cirencester Beeches
Party	Candidate	Votes	%	±%
Liberal Democrats	Nigel Robbins	1,971	58	+19
Conservative	Stuart Tarr	1,179	34	+3
Green	Joy Irving	138	4	0
UKIP	Chris Harlow	132	4	−16
Majority		792	24	+16
Liberal Democrats hold		Swing		

Cirencester Park
Party	Candidate	Votes	%	±%
Liberal Democrats	Joe Harris	2,193	63	+8
Conservative	Tony Curry	957	27	+5
Labour	Terry Pomroy	176	5	0
UKIP	Bob Stephens	94	3	−11
Green	Bob Irving	92	2	−1
Majority		1,236	36	+3
Liberal Democrats hold		Swing		

Fairford and Lechlade on Thames
Party	Candidate	Votes	%	±%
Conservative	Raymond Theodoulou	1,867	55	+7
Liberal Democrats	Andrew Doherty	1,081	32	+15
Labour	Trevor Smith	197	6	−4
Green	Xanthe Messenger	141	4	−2
UKIP	Pete Bown	106	3	−16
Majority		786	23	−6
Conservative hold		Swing		

South Cerney
Party	Candidate	Votes	%	±%
Conservative	Shaun Parsons	1,746	49	+10
Liberal Democrats	Tatyan Cheung	1,690	48	+20
UKIP	Margaret Rastelli	118	3	−15
Majority		56	1	−10
Conservative hold		Swing		

Stow-on-the-Wold
Party	Candidate	Votes	%	±%
Conservative	Nigel Moor	2,340	63	+6
Liberal Democrats	Rachel Coxcoon	1,014	27	+21
Green	Andrew Maclean	210	6	−2
UKIP	Edeltraud French	139	4	−14
Majority		1,326	36	−3
Conservative hold		Swing		

Tetbury
Party	Candidate	Votes	%	±%
Conservative	Stephen Hirst	2,061	69	+28
Green	Sabrina Poole	743	25	+20
UKIP	Guy Parfitt	204	7	−12
Majority		1318	44	+22
Conservative hold		Swing		

=== Forest of Dean ===
Blakeney and Bream
Party	Candidate	Votes	%	±%
Conservative	Richard Henry Boyles	1,224	33	+7
UKIP	Richard Nicholas Leppington	1,053	28	−8
Labour	Janet Hazel Keene	743	20	−13
Green	Louise Mary Elliott	387	10	+10
Liberal Democrats	Derek George Couzens	297	8	+2
Majority		171	5	+2
Conservative gain from UKIP		Swing		

Cinderford
Party	Candidate	Votes	%	±%
Labour	Graham Leslie Morgan	1,144	54	+7
Conservative	Marc Silverthorn	527	25	+12
UKIP	Roger Ashley Jean Wilkinson	201	9	−19
Green	Jill Raymond	178	8	+3
Liberal Democrats	Lindsey Margaret Read	69	3	−4
Majority		617	29	+10
Labour hold		Swing		

Coleford
Party	Candidate	Votes	%	±%
Conservative	Carole Ann Alloway-Martin	1,128	48	+23
Labour	Shaun Stammers	603	26	−7
Liberal Democrats	Heather Margaret Lusty	231	10	+5
UKIP	Martin Robert Hill	225	10	−15
Green	Fiona Bowie	145	6	+6
Majority		525	22	+14
Conservative gain from Labour		Swing		

Drybrook and Lydbrook
Party	Candidate	Votes	%	±%
Conservative	Terry Hale	874	33	+18
Independent	Andrew Edward Gardiner	828	31	+6
Labour	Di Martin	692	26	+2
Liberal Democrats	Gill Moseley	133	5	+2
UKIP	Averil Elisabeth Sumners	132	5	−24
Majority		46	2	−2
Conservative gain from UKIP		Swing		

Lydney
Party	Candidate	Votes	%	±%
Conservative	Alan Preest*	1,110	46	+28
Labour	Mel Farrant	578	24	+5
UKIP	Alan Grant	332	14	−28
Green	James Greenwood	270	11	+4
Liberal Democrats	Terry Tull	144	6	+6
Majority		532	22	−1
Conservative gain from UKIP		Swing		

- Alan Preest was elected in 2013 as a UKIP councillor

Mitcheldean
Party	Candidate	Votes	%	±%
Conservative	Brian Robinson	1,762	55	+31
Liberal Democrats	Sue Henchley	632	20	+14
Labour	Angela Sullivan	452	14	+4
UKIP	Ian Mitchell Aitken	193	6	−13
Green	Poppy Turpin-West	153	5	+1
Majority		1,130	35	+27
Conservative gain from Independent		Swing		

- The seat had previously been gained in a by-election. Changes shown are those from 2013.

Newent
Party	Candidate	Votes	%	±%
Conservative	Will Windsor-Clive	1,794	63	+26
Labour	Roger Anthony Sterry	311	11	−1
Green	David Richard Humphreys	301	11	+6
Liberal Democrats	Ian Iredale King	243	9	+7
UKIP	Alec Robert Tritton	188	7	−15
Majority		1,483	52	+37
Conservative hold		Swing		

Sedbury
Party	Candidate	Votes	%	±%
Conservative	Patrick Christopher Molyneux	1,312	39	+8
Green	Chris McFarling	780	23	+12
Labour	Jake Ivor Lewis	479	14	−4
Liberal Democrats	Roy Birch	363	11	−3
Independent	Gethyn Joffre Davies	265	8	+8
UKIP	John Duncan William McOwan	123	4	−22
Majority		532	16	+11
Conservative hold		Swing		

=== Gloucester ===
Abbey
Party	Candidate	Votes	%	±%
Conservative	Andrew Gravells	2,320	70	+23
Labour	Kirsten Hodges	600	18	0
Liberal Democrats	Oliver Hartland Mountjoy	409	12	+2
Majority		1,720	52	+28
Conservative hold		Swing		

Barnwood and Hucclecote
Party	Candidate	Votes	%	±%
Liberal Democrats	David John Brown	2,127	50	+9
Conservative	Lise Noakes	1,731	41	+10
Labour	Trevor Howard	303	7	−3
Green	Frances Joan Griffiths	77	2	+2
Majority		396	9	−1
Liberal Democrats hold		Swing		

Barton and Tredworth
Party	Candidate	Votes	%	±%
Conservative	Sajid Patel	1,459	51	+9
Labour	Carol Francis	1,157	40	−6
UKIP	Phillip Anthony William Nash	165	6	+6
Liberal Democrats	Christopher Ward	107	4	−2
Majority		302	11	+7
Conservative gain from Labour		Swing		

Coney Hill and Matson
Party	Candidate	Votes	%	±%
Labour	Kate Haigh	940	43	−3
Conservative	Jenny Watkins	806	37	+21
UKIP	Gary Frederick Cleaver	241	11	−19
Liberal Democrats	Stephen Derick John Morrison	211	10	+5
Majority		134	6	−10
Labour hold		Swing		

Grange and Kingsway
Party	Candidate	Votes	%	±%
Conservative	David Norman	1,558	57	+25
Labour	Mat McCall	668	25	−11
UKIP	Rob McCormick	193	7	−17
Liberal Democrats	David William Bebbington	190	7	+3
Green	Robert Peter Brookes	103	4	0
Majority		890	32	+28
Conservative gain from Labour		Swing		

Hempsted and Westgate
Party	Candidate	Votes	%	±%
Conservative	Pam Tracey	1,171	50	+5
Labour	Neil Hampton	709	30	−3
Liberal Democrats	Imogen Alice Caterer	202	9	+1
UKIP	Daniel Woolf	138	6	+6
Green	Matthew John Sidford	129	5	−9
Majority		462	20	+8
Conservative hold		Swing		

Kingsholm and Wotton
Party	Candidate	Votes	%	±%
Liberal Democrats	Jeremy Eric Hilton	1,525	52	+11
Conservative	Justin Hudson	694	24	+7
Labour	Jack Fayter	531	18	−1
Green	Jonathan Cecil Ingleby	98	3	−3
UKIP	Edit Kovacs	83	3	−11
Majority		831	28	+6
Liberal Democrats hold		Swing		

Longlevens
Party	Candidate	Votes	%	±%
Conservative	Kathy Williams	1,884	49	+8
Liberal Democrats	Linda S Castle	1,374	36	+16
Labour	Steve Gower	312	8	−3
UKIP	Matt Young	155	4	−19
Green	Christopher David Britton	108	3	−1
Majority		510	13	−5
Conservative hold		Swing		

Quedgeley
Party	Candidate	Votes	%	±%
Conservative	Mark Damian Hawthorne	1,364	50	+18
Liberal Democrats	Anna Mozol	757	28	+5
Labour	John Bloxsom	321	12	−8
UKIP	Scott Clacher	178	7	−13
Green	Gerald Owain Hartley	84	3	−2
Majority		607	22	+13
Conservative hold		Swing		

Tuffley
Party	Candidate	Votes	%	±%
Conservative	Andrew Gilbert Miller	1,710	52	+17
Labour	Tracey Sharon Millard	1,191	36	0
UKIP	Simon Paul Collins	226	7	−17
Liberal Democrats	Abigail Ciara Watson	185	6	+1
Majority		519	16	+15
Conservative gain from Labour		Swing		

=== Stroud ===
Bisley and Painswick
Party	Candidate	Votes	%	±%
Conservative	Keith Stuart Rippington	2,163	50	+9
Green	Alan Mossman	1,230	28	+3
Liberal Democrats	Alexander Findlay	964	22	+18
Majority		933	22	+6
Conservative hold		Swing		

Cam Valley
Party	Candidate	Votes	%	±%
Conservative	Brian Tipper	2,166	54	+11
Labour	Julie Douglass	1,456	36	−5
Liberal Democrats	Adrian Anthony Walker-Smith	411	10	+1
Majority		710	18	+16
Conservative hold		Swing		

Dursley
Party	Candidate	Votes	%	±%
Conservative	Loraine Vivienne Patrick	1,574	45	+12
Labour	Steve Lydon	1,339	38	+3
Liberal Democrats	George William James Butcher	608	17	−3
Majority		235	7	+5
Conservative gain from Labour		Swing		

Hardwicke and Severn
Party	Candidate	Votes	%	±%
Conservative	Stephen Frank Davies	1,655	58	+6
Liberal Democrats	Mike Stayte	470	17	+12
Labour	Liz Ashton	442	16	−11
Green	Sue Hartley	272	10	−5
Majority		1,185	41	+16
Conservative hold		Swing		

Minchinhampton
Party	Candidate	Votes	%	±%
Green	Rachel Smith	2,320	50	+25
Conservative	Dorcas Lavinia Maxine Binns	2,293	50	+17
Majority		27	0	−8
Green gain from Conservative		Swing		

Nailsworth
Party	Candidate	Votes	%	±%
Labour	Steve Robinson	1,722	42	+7
Conservative	Emma Sims	1,559	38	−4
Green	Sarah Blowers	436	11	−7
Liberal Democrats	Colleen Angela Rothwell	365	9	+5
Independent	Robert Hansjorg Paterson	66	2	+2
Majority		163	4	−3
Labour gain from Conservative		Swing		

Rodborough
Party	Candidate	Votes	%	±%
Labour	Brian Oosthuysen	1,508	45	+2
Conservative	Alex Bisset	1,048	31	+13
Green	Philip Blomberg	488	15	+4
Liberal Democrats	Christine Linda Headley	292	9	−1
Majority		460	14	−11
Labour hold		Swing		

Stonehouse
Party	Candidate	Votes	%	±%
Labour	Lesley Williams	1,361	46	+2
Conservative	Ginny Anne Smart	953	32	+14
Green	Carol Jill Kambites	251	8	+1
Liberal Democrats	Sylvia Jean Bridgland	213	7	+4
UKIP	Glenville Alexander Gogerly	183	6	−10
Majority		408	14	−12
Labour hold		Swing		

Stroud Central
Party	Candidate	Votes	%	±%
Green	Eva Ward	1,742	41	+1
Labour	Debbie Hicks	1,262	30	+2
Conservative	Debbie Young	1,000	24	+9
Liberal Democrats	Steve Dechan	242	6	+3
Majority		480	11	−1
Green hold		Swing		

Wotton-under-Edge
Party	Candidate	Votes	%	±%
Liberal Democrats	John Edward Cordwell	1,776	47	+4
Conservative	Graham Smith	1,545	41	+3
Labour	Mark Huband	337	9	−3
UKIP	David Hinder	128	3	+3
Majority		231	6	+1
Liberal Democrats hold		Swing		

=== Tewkesbury ===
Bishop's Cleeve
Party	Candidate	Votes	%	±%
Conservative	Robert Anthony Bird	2,277	61	+12
Liberal Democrats	Peter Raymond Norcross Richmond	1,009	27	−10
Labour	Rose Phillips	302	8	−5
Green	Cate Cody	143	4	+4
Majority		1,268	34	+22
Conservative hold		Swing		

Brockworth
Party	Candidate	Votes	%	±%
Conservative	Robert John Edward Vines	1,788	53	+11
Liberal Democrats	Clare Louise Softley	1,055	32	−9
Green	Graham Anthony Allen	252	8	+8
UKIP	Sarah Jane Field	248	7	+7
Majority		733	21	+20
Conservative hold		Swing		

Churchdown
Party	Candidate	Votes	%	±%
Liberal Democrats	Jack Lawrence Williams	1,768	51	+2
Conservative	Graham John Bocking	1,415	40	+10
Labour	Colin Gordon Simpson	316	9	−5
Majority		353	11	−8
Liberal Democrats hold		Swing		

Highnam
Party	Candidate	Votes	%	±%
Conservative	Phil Awford	2,530	71	+4
Labour	Stephen Robert Miller	446	13	−6
Liberal Democrats	Helen S Munro	340	10	−4
Green	Susan Joan Billington	246	7	+7
Majority		2,084	58	+10
Conservative hold		Swing		

Tewkesbury
Party	Candidate	Votes	%	±%
Conservative	Kevin John Cromwell	1,192	41	+12
Independent	Mike Sztymiak	1,148	39	−1
Labour	Edward Hudson	254	9	+1
Liberal Democrats	Guy Dennis St John Fancourt	157	5	+2
UKIP	Stuart George Adair	112	4	−16
Independent	Gavin Preedy	75	3	+3
Majority		44	2	−9
Conservative gain from Independent		Swing		

Tewkesbury East
Party	Candidate	Votes	%	±%
Conservative	Vernon Dennis Smith	1,652	64	+27
Liberal Democrats	Cait Clucas	440	17	+7
Labour	Fiona Cochrane Castle	368	14	+5
Green	Simon James Carter	131	5	+3
Majority		1,212	47	+31
Conservative hold		Swing		

Winchcombe and Woodmancote
Party	Candidate	Votes	%	±%
Conservative	Roger Edward Wilson	2,469	64	+2
Liberal Democrats	Tom Brinicombe	960	25	+4
Labour	Stanford Leigh Mitchell	260	7	−10
Green	Sophie Dominique Franklin	177	5	+5
Majority		1,509	39	−3
Conservative hold		Swing		

== By-elections between 2017 and 2021 ==
=== Churchdown ===
A by-election was held on Thursday 3 May 2019 for the Churchdown Division due to the death of County Councillor Jack Williams.

Churchdown by-election 3 May 2019
Party	Candidate	Votes	%	±%
Liberal Democrats	Ben Evans	1,405	48	−3
Conservative	Graham Bocking	811	28	−12
Independent	Dick Bishop	263	9	+9
Green	Cate Cody	249	8	+8
UKIP	Robert McCormick	213	7	+7
Turnout				
Liberal Democrats hold		Swing		
