= Gloucester Shire Hall =

County building in Gloucester, Gloucestershire, England

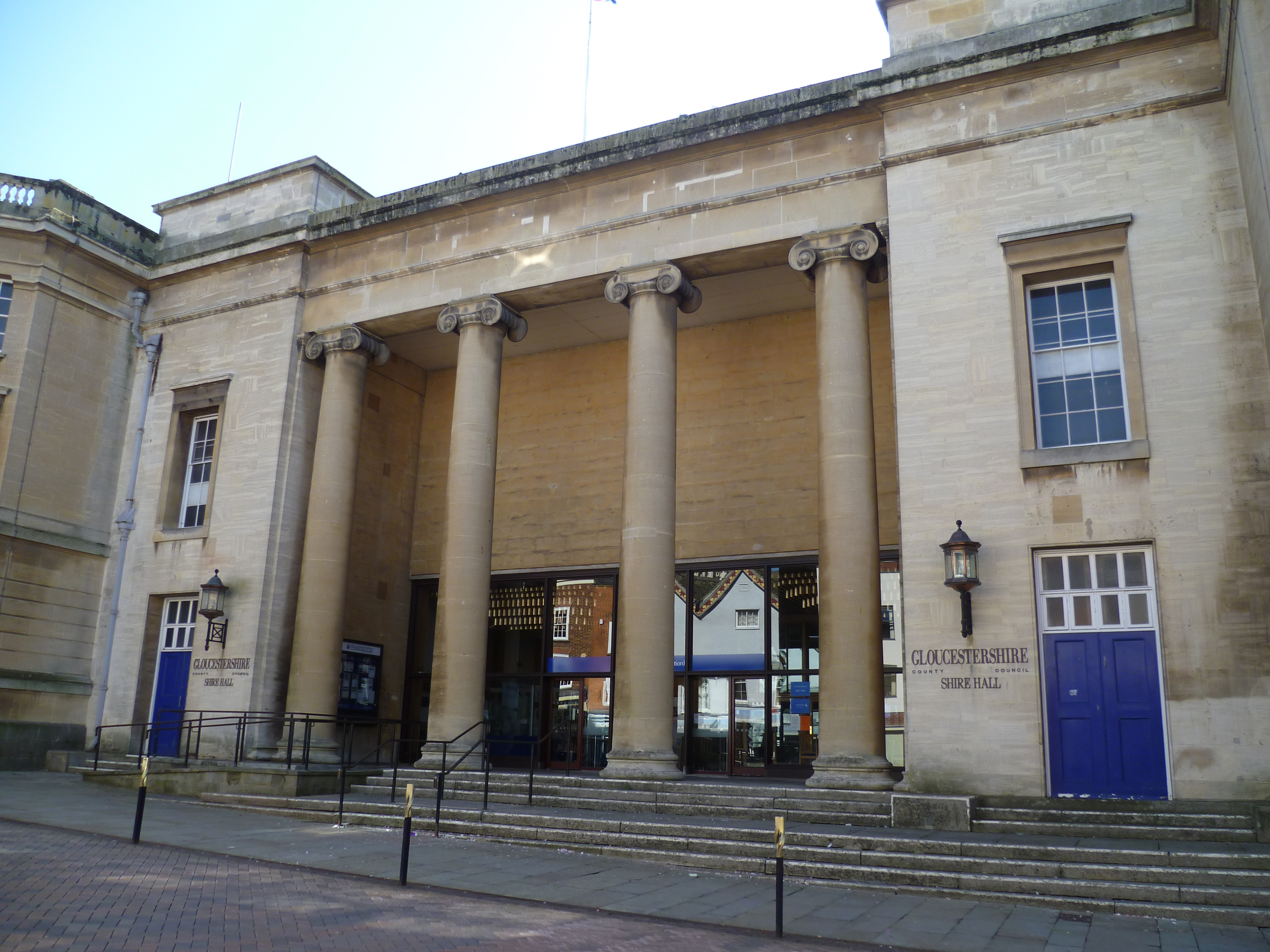

- Location within Gloucestershire
- 51.8664°N 2.2486°W
- Location: Gloucester, Gloucestershire

History
- Built: 1816

Site notes
- Architect: Robert Smirke
- Architectural style: Greek Revival style

Listed Building – Grade II
- Designated: 23 January 1952
- Reference no.: 1245084

Gloucester Shire Hall is a municipal building in Westgate Street, Gloucester. The shire hall, which is the main office and the meeting place of Gloucestershire County Council, is a grade II listed building.

== History ==
The building was designed by Sir Robert Smirke for Gloucestershire magistrates in the Greek Revival style, built in ashlar stone and was opened in 1816. The design for the building involved a symmetrical main frontage facing Westgate Street; the central section of three bays featured a large portico with four Ionic order columns supporting an entablature; there were single bay flanking wings. The design was inspired by the temple on the River Ilisos in Greece, which was designed by Callicrates and completed in c.430 BC. A courthouse, also designed by Smirke, was built at the rear of the shire hall, and was completed around the same time.

Following the implementation of the Local Government Act 1888, which established county councils in every county, the shire hall also became the meeting place of Gloucestershire County Council. It was internally remodelled in 1896 to accommodate a council chamber and offices for the county council. Substantial three-storey wings with canted corners, which were designed by the county surveyor, Matthew Henry Medland, were erected on either side of the existing frontage in 1911. The eastern wing extended along Berkeley Street.

Queen Elizabeth II, accompanied by Duke of Edinburgh, paid a visit to the shire hall, before departing for the guildhall, during a visit to the city on 3 May 1955. In the 1960s the building was largely demolished and rebuilt, retaining only the 1816 portico and the 1911 flanking wings. Substantial extensions were added to the rear at the same time, including additional blocks on the west side along Upper Quay Street, across Bearland and to the south west of Bearland. The internal alterations included the creation of a new council chamber, which was opened by Queen Elizabeth The Queen Mother on 14 November 1963. An extensive programme of refurbishment works to the 1960s buildings, intended to create an open plan environment, together with re-cladding works, intended to make the facilities more energy efficient, was carried out by Kier Group, based on a design by Quattro Design Architects, and completed in late 2018.

Works of art in the shire hall include a portrait of the former Lord Lieutenant of Gloucestershire, Henry Reynolds-Moreton, 3rd Earl of Ducie, by Alexander Glasgow (1840–1894).
