= 2021 Gloucestershire County Council election =

Gloucestershire County Council election

← 2017	6 May 2021	2025 →

All 53 seats to Gloucestershire County Council 27 seats needed for a majority

	First party	Second party
Party	Conservative	Liberal Democrats
Last election	31 seats, 45.1%	14 seats, 27.4%
Seats won	28	16
Seat change	▼3	▲2
Popular vote	87,833	49,528
Percentage	43.9%	24.8%
Swing	▼1.2%	▼2.6%
	Third party	Fourth party
Party	Labour	Green
Last election	5 seats, 14.4%	1 seat, 7.7%
Seats won	5	4
Seat change	Steady	▲2
Popular vote	30,832	25,916
Percentage	15.4%	13.0%
Swing	▲1.0%	▲5.3%
- Map showing the results of the 2021 Gloucestershire County Council election
Council control before election
Conservative
Council control after election
Conservative

The 2021 Gloucestershire County Council election took place on 6 May 2021 alongside other local elections. All 53 seats to Gloucestershire County Council were up for election. The Conservatives retained their majority, albeit a smaller one than in 2017.

== Background and election campaign ==
Gloucestershire in 2017.

Gloucestershire in 2019.

In the 2017 Gloucestershire County Council election, the Conservatives won overall control of the council.

At the 2019 United Kingdom general election, the Labour Party lost their only parliamentary seat in Gloucestershire.

Before the election, the council consisted of 28 Conservatives, 13 Liberal Democrats, 5 Labour (4 being Labour Co-op), 2 Green, 1 People Against Bureaucracy, 3 Independents and 1 vacant seat.

There was some controversy over alleged delivery of election material and campaigning due to the ongoing COVID-19 pandemic in the United Kingdom. One candidate in the election was reported to the Gloucestershire Constabulary for allegedly breaching lockdown regulations but she denied this and claimed that the leaflets were not election related. The Liberal Democrats in the county claimed that it was a politically motivated attack on their campaign by the Conservative Party.

== Council composition ==
After 2017 election		Before 2021 election		After 2021 election	
Party	Seats	Party	Seats	Party	Seats
Conservative	31	Conservative	28	Conservative	28
Liberal Democrats	14	Liberal Democrats	13	Liberal Democrats	16
Labour	3	Labour Co-op	4	Labour Co-op	4
Green	2	Independent	3	Green	4
Labour Co-op	2	Green	2	Labour	1
PAB	1	Labour	1		
		PAB	1		
		Vacant	1		

== Summary ==
=== Election result ===
2021 Gloucestershire County Council election
Party	Candidates	Seats	Gains	Losses	Net gain/loss	Seats %	Votes %	Votes	+/−
Conservative	53	28	4	7	▼3	52.8	43.9	87,833	–1.2
Liberal Democrats	44	16	3	1	▲2	30.2	24.8	49,528	–2.6
Labour	49	5	2	2	Steady	9.4	15.4	30,832	+1.0
Green	39	4	3	1	▲2	7.5	13.0	25,916	+5.3
Independent	14	0	0	0	Steady	0.0	2.2	4,340	+1.0
Reform UK	2	0	0	0	Steady	0.0	0.2	432	N/A
Freedom Alliance (UK)	3	0	0	0	Steady	0.0	0.2	315	N/A
TUSC	5	0	0	0	Steady	0.0	0.1	179	N/A
Libertarian	2	0	0	0	Steady	0.0	0.1	169	N/A
UKIP	1	0	0	0	Steady	0.0	0.1	91	–3.1
Liberal	1	0	0	0	Steady	0.0	<0.1	77	N/A
Heritage	1	0	0	0	Steady	0.0	<0.1	68	N/A
PAB	0	0	0	1	▼1	0.0	0.0	0	–0.9

== Results by Division ==
=== Cheltenham ===
Cheltenham district summary
Party	Seats	+/-	Votes	%	+/-
Liberal Democrats	7	▼1	16,071	42.1	–7.3
Conservative	5	▲2	15,128	39.6	+4.5
Green	0	Steady	4,757	12.5	+8.0
Labour	0	Steady	2,250	5.9	±0.0
PAB	0	▼1	N/A	N/A	–4.4
Total	12	Steady	38,206		

Division results

All Saints and Oakley
Party	Candidate	Votes	%	±%
Liberal Democrats	Colin Hay	1,385	47.00	−6
Conservative	Jake Hardy	897	30.44	−1
Green	Jessica West	396	13.44	+6
Labour	Isobel Laing	269	9.13	−1
Majority		488	16.56	−5
Turnout		2,947	34.78	+2.01
Liberal Democrats hold		Swing		

Battledown and Charlton Kings
Party	Candidate	Votes	%	±%
Conservative	Matt Babbage	1,988	45	−1
Liberal Democrats	Paul McCloskey	1,767	40	−5
Green	Lorraine Mason	430	10	+5
Labour	Ella Rees	216	5	±0
Majority		221	5	+4
Turnout		4,401	48.49	+2.15
Conservative hold		Swing		

Benhall and Up Hatherley
Party	Candidate	Votes	%	±%
Liberal Democrats	Roger Whyborn	2,037	50	−2
Conservative	Jonathan Beeston	1,557	38	−2
Green	Samantha Hodges	360	9	+5
Labour	Robin Carey	148	4	±0
Majority		480	12	±0
Turnout		4,102	50.77	+4.43
Liberal Democrats hold		Swing		

Charlton Park and College
Party	Candidate	Votes	%	±%
Liberal Democrats	Paul Baker	2,106	48	−13
Conservative	Graham Bocking	1,608	37	+5
Green	Sharon Wallington	432	10	+6
Labour	Robert Arnott	216	5	+2
Majority		498	11	−18
Turnout		4,362	52.57	+5.64
Liberal Democrats hold		Swing		

Hesters Way and Springbank
Party	Candidate	Votes	%	±%
Liberal Democrats	Suzanne Williams	1,333	48	−6
Conservative	Laura Haley	972	35	+5
Labour	Thomas Johnson	252	9	+1
Green	Adrian Becker	220	8	+5
Majority		361	13	−11
Turnout		2,777	27.82	+1.51
Liberal Democrats hold		Swing		

Lansdown and Park
Party	Candidate	Votes	%	±%
Conservative	Tim Harman	2,101	48	−2
Liberal Democrats	Paul Wheat	1,636	38	−4
Green	Stephen Bell	620	14	+10
Majority		465	10	+2
Turnout		4,357	48.07	−2.15
Conservative hold		Swing		

Leckhampton and Warden Hill
Party	Candidate	Votes	%	±%
Conservative	Margaret Nelson	1,982	42	−1
Liberal Democrats	Iain Dobie	1,878	40	−9
Green	Peter Frings	684	15	+11
Labour	Ian White	133	3	−1
Majority		104	2	−4
Turnout		4,677	53.70	+3.48
Conservative gain from Liberal Democrats		Swing		

Pittville and Prestbury
Party	Candidate	Votes	%	±%
Conservative	Stephan Fifield	2,327	53	+32
Liberal Democrats	Jason Potter-Peachey	1,143	26	−9
Green	Billy Wassell	561	13	+10
Labour	Julie Farmer	375	9	+6
Majority		1,184	27	+24
Turnout		4,406	45.82	+0.79
Conservative gain from PAB		Swing		

St Mark’s and St Peter’s
Party	Candidate	Votes	%	±%
Liberal Democrats	David Willingham	1,651	49	−10
Conservative	Daniel Ruff	941	28	+5
Green	Malcolm Allison	404	12	+5
Labour	Clive Harriss	344	10	+2
Majority		710	21	−15
Turnout		3,340	32.71	+1.96
Liberal Democrats hold		Swing		

St Paul’s and Swindon
Party	Candidate	Votes	%	±%
Liberal Democrats	Bernie Fisher	1,135	40	−10
Conservative	Rhiannon Evans	755	27	+3
Green	Tabi Joy	650	23	+16
Labour	Kenneth Syme	297	10	−8
Majority		380	13	−13
Turnout		2,837	32.52	+5.26
Liberal Democrats hold		Swing		

=== Cotswold ===
Cotswold district summary
Party	Seats	+/-	Votes	%	+/-
Conservative	4	▼1	14,512	47.1	–3.0
Liberal Democrats	4	▲1	11,302	36.7	–3.2
Green	0	Steady	2,472	8.0	+2.6
Labour	0	Steady	1,974	6.4	+5.1
Reform UK	0	Steady	436	1.4	N/A
Liberal	0	Steady	77	0.2	N/A
TUSC	0	Steady	33	0.1	N/A
Total	8	Steady	30,806		

Division results

Bourton-on-the-Water and Northleach
Party	Candidate	Votes	%	±%
Liberal Democrats	Paul Hodgkinson	2,136	56	−4
Conservative	Tom Bradley	1,241	32	−8
Labour	Timothy Davies	242	6	+6
Green	Bob Irving	150	4	+4
Liberal	Byron Hadley	77	2	+2
Majority		895	24	+4
Turnout		3,846	43.69	−2.71
Liberal Democrats hold		Swing		

Campden-Vale
Party	Candidate	Votes	%	±%
Conservative	Lynden Stowe	2,323	63	−5
Green	Clare Turner	735	20	+15
Reform UK	Robert McNeil-Wilson	359	10	+7
Labour	John Callinan	290	8	+8
Majority		1,588	43	−2
Turnout		3,707	43.20	+4.70
Conservative hold		Swing		

Cirencester Beeches
Party	Candidate	Votes	%	±%
Liberal Democrats	Joe Harris	2,085	54	−4
Conservative	David Fowles	1,422	37	+3
Green	Erin Hughes	207	5	+1
Labour	Sebastian Parkinson	126	3	+3
TUSC	Alan Mackenzie	33	1	+1
Majority		663	17	−7
Turnout		3,873	43.41	+4.61
Liberal Democrats hold		Swing		

Cirencester Park
Party	Candidate	Votes	%	±%
Liberal Democrats	Rebecca Halifax	1,824	54	−9
Conservative	Robert Gibson	1,106	33	+6
Green	Ariana Strait	225	7	+5
Labour	Robin Layfield	215	6	+1
Majority		718	21	−15
Turnout		3,370	40.49	−1.01
Liberal Democrats hold		Swing		

Fairford and Lechlade on Thames
Party	Candidate	Votes	%	±%
Conservative	Dom Morris	2,326	59	+4
Liberal Democrats	Tony Dale	1,344	34	+2
Labour	Sharon Aldrick	261	7	+1
Majority		982	25	+2
Turnout		3,931	45.20	+5.40
Conservative hold		Swing		

South Cerney
Party	Candidate	Votes	%	±%
Liberal Democrats	Lisa Spivey	2,133	51	+3
Conservative	Shaun Parsons	1,816	43	−6
Labour	Maggie Elsey	189	4	+4
Reform UK	Simon Moxon	77	2	+2
Majority		317	8	+7
Turnout		4,215	48.38	+6.38
Liberal Democrats gain from Conservative		Swing		

Stow-on-the-Wold
Party	Candidate	Votes	%	±%
Conservative	Mark Mackenzie-Charrington	2,272	53	−10
Liberal Democrats	Clive Webster	1,780	42	+15
Labour	John Beer	226	5	+5
Majority		492	11	−25
Turnout		4,278	41.54	+3.84
Conservative hold		Swing		

Tetbury
Party	Candidate	Votes	%	±%
Conservative	Stephen Hirst	2,006	56	−13
Green	Sabrina Poole	1,155	32	+7
Labour	Simon Bye	425	12	+12
Majority		851	24	−20
Turnout		3,586	41.16	+4.16
Conservative hold		Swing		

=== Forest of Dean ===
Forest of Dean district summary
Party	Seats	+/-	Votes	%	+/-
Conservative	4	▼3	10,506	41.7	–1.4
Green	2	▲2	5,192	20.6	+10.8
Labour	1	Steady	4,341	17.2	–4.9
Liberal Democrats	1	▲1	2,084	8.3	–1.0
Independent	0	Steady	2,894	11.5	+6.7
UKIP	0	Steady	91	0.4	–10.4
TUSC	0	Steady	85	0.3	N/A
Total	8	Steady	25,193		

Division results

Blakeney and Bream
Party	Candidate	Votes	%	±%
Green	Beki Hoyland	1,345	34	+24
Conservative	Richard Boyles	1,328	34	+1
Independent	Richard Leppington	662	17	−11
Labour	Khady Gueye	622	16	−4
Majority		17	0.4	−5
Turnout		3,957	42	
Green gain from Conservative		Swing		

Cinderford
Party	Candidate	Votes	%	±%
Labour	Graham Morgan	1,125	51	−3
Conservative	Carol Thomas	736	33	+8
Green	Alison Bruce	264	12	+4
Liberal Democrats	Peter Brown	65	3	±0
TUSC	Ian Quick	22	1	+1
Majority		489	18	−11
Turnout		2,212	27	
Labour hold		Swing		

Coleford
Party	Candidate	Votes	%	±%
Conservative	Carole Allaway-Martin	1,149	44	−4
Labour	Matt Bishop	688	26	±0
Independent	Ian Whitburn	633	24	+24
Liberal Democrats	Peter Taylor	158	6	−4
Majority		461	18	−4
Turnout		2,628	31	
Conservative hold		Swing		

Drybrook and Lydbrook
Party	Candidate	Votes	%	±%
Conservative	Terry Hale	1,039	33	±0
Independent	Thom Forester	804	26	+26
Labour Co-op	Di Martin	775	25	−1
Green	Sid Phelps	411	13	+13
Liberal Democrats	Andrew Cooley	73	2	−3
Majority		235	7	+5
Turnout		3,102	38	
Conservative hold		Swing		

Lydney
Party	Candidate	Votes	%	±%
Conservative	Alan Preest	1,514	54	+8
Labour	Mel Farrant	566	20	−4
Green	Andy Wright	417	15	+4
Liberal Democrats	Terry Tull	137	5	−1
UKIP	Alan Grant	91	3	−11
TUSC	Claude Mickleson	63	2	+2
Majority		948	34	+12
Turnout		2,788	34	
Conservative hold		Swing		

Mitcheldean
Party	Candidate	Votes	%	±%
Conservative	Philip Robinson	1,669	48	−7
Independent	Brian Robinson	795	23	−32
Labour	Shaun Stammers	565	16	+2
Green	Jackie Dale	429	12	+7
Majority		874	25	−10
Turnout		3,458	41	
Conservative hold		Swing		

Newent
Party	Candidate	Votes	%	±%
Liberal Democrats	Gill Moseley	1,651	51	+42
Conservative	Will Windsor-Clive	1,579	49	−14
Majority		72	2	−50
Turnout		3,230	38	
Liberal Democrats gain from Conservative		Swing		

Sedbury
Party	Candidate	Votes	%	±%
Green	Chris McFarling	2,326	61	+38
Conservative	Patrick Molyneux	1,492	39	±0
Majority		834	22	+6
Turnout		3,818	47	
Green gain from Conservative		Swing		

=== Gloucester ===
Gloucester district summary
Party	Seats	+/-	Votes	%	+/-
Conservative	8	▲1	16,432	48.3	+0.1
Liberal Democrats	2	Steady	8,083	23.7	+0.5
Labour	0	▼1	6,787	19.9	–2.2
Independent	0	Steady	1,327	3.9	N/A
Green	0	Steady	1,255	3.7	+1.7
Libertarian	0	Steady	101	0.3	N/A
TUSC	0	Steady	30	0.1	N/A
Freedom Alliance	0	Steady	29	0.1	N/A
Total	10	Steady	34,044		

Division results

Abbey
Party	Candidate	Votes	%	±%
Conservative	Andrew Gravells	2,499	65	−5
Liberal Democrats	Alwin Wiederhold	712	19	+7
Labour	Sam Maynard	607	16	−2
Majority		1,787	46	−6
Turnout		3,818	40.59	
Conservative hold		Swing		

Barnwood and Hucclecote
Party	Candidate	Votes	%	±%
Liberal Democrats	David Brown	2,173	51	+1
Conservative	Fred Ramsey	1,416	33	−8
Labour	Trevor Howard	376	9	+2
Green	Frances Griffiths	148	3	+1
Independent	Jim Woods	107	2	+2
Green	Anthony Bergonzi	66	2	±0
Majority		757	18	+9
Turnout		4,286	46.13	
Liberal Democrats hold		Swing		

Barton and Tredworth
Party	Candidate	Votes	%	±%
Conservative	Sajid Patel	1,791	54	+3
Labour	Usman Bhaimia	1,194	36	−4
Independent	Simon Collins	154	5	+5
Liberal Democrats	Sandra Adams	152	5	+1
Majority		525	18	+7
Turnout		3,291	37.29	
Conservative hold		Swing		

Coney Hill and Matson
Party	Candidate	Votes	%	±%
Conservative	Alastair Chambers	1,271	51	+14
Labour	Lesley Williams	677	27	−16
Liberal Democrats	Luke Shervey	215	9	−1
Independent	Robert McCormick	157	6	+6
Green	Adam Shearing	152	6	+6
TUSC	Susan Powell	30	1	+1
Majority		594	24	+18
Turnout		2,502	29.95	
Conservative gain from Labour		Swing		

Grange and Kingsway
Party	Candidate	Votes	%	±%
Conservative	David Norman	1,774	57	±0
Labour	Gary Mills	725	23	−2
Green	Robert Brookes	236	8	+4
Independent	Scott Clacher	213	7	+7
Liberal Democrats	Paul Caiden	169	5	−2
Majority		1,049	34	+2
Turnout		3,117	30.40	
Conservative hold		Swing		

Hempsted and Westgate
Party	Candidate	Votes	%	±%
Conservative	Pam Tracey	1,365	42	−8
Labour	Jake Pier	803	25	−5
Liberal Democrats	Rebecca Trimnell	746	23	+14
Green	Mike Byfield	213	7	+2
Independent	Philip Nash	94	3	+3
Majority		563	17	−3
Turnout		3,221	35.30	
Conservative hold		Swing		

Kingsholm and Wotton
Party	Candidate	Votes	%	±%
Liberal Democrats	Jeremy Hilton	1,574	50	−2
Conservative	Peter Sheehy	779	25	+1
Labour	Ola Kareem	500	16	−2
Green	Jonathan Ingleby	196	6	+3
Independent	John McStay	73	2	+2
Majority		795	25	−3
Turnout		3,122	38.46	
Liberal Democrats hold		Swing		

Longlevens
Party	Candidate	Votes	%	±%
Conservative	Kathy Williams	2,087	52	+3
Liberal Democrats	Sarah Sawyer	1,350	33	−3
Labour	Ellis Fincham	461	11	+3
Libertarian	Matthew Young	101	2	−2
Independent	Stuart Love	46	1	+1
Majority		737	19	+6
Turnout		4,045	43.10	
Conservative hold		Swing		

Quedgeley
Party	Candidate	Votes	%	±%
Conservative	Mark Hawthorne	1,633	53	+3
Liberal Democrats	Liam Harries	665	22	−6
Labour	Jack Fayter	438	14	+2
No Description	Anna Mozol	296	10	−18
Freedom Alliance	Rhondda Lee	29	1	+1
Majority		968	31	+9
Turnout		3,061	35.29	
Conservative hold		Swing		

Tuffley
Party	Candidate	Votes	%	±%
Conservative	Andrew Miller	1,817	51	−1
Labour	Tracy Millard	1,006	28	−8
Liberal Democrats	Sebastian Field	327	9	+3
Green	Sharon Byfield	244	7	+7
Independent	Gary Cleaver	187	5	+5
Majority		811	23	+7
Turnout		3,581	37.97	
Conservative hold		Swing		

=== Stroud ===
Stroud district summary
Party	Seats	+/-	Votes	%	+/-
Conservative	4	Steady	18,176	41.1	–1.1
Labour	4	▲1	12,548	28.4	+3.5
Green	1	▼1	9,175	20.7	+2.9
Liberal Democrats	1	Steady	3,548	8.0	–6.1
Independent	0	Steady	415	0.9	+0.7
Freedom Alliance	0	Steady	221	0.5	N/A
Heritage	0	Steady	68	0.2	N/A
Libertarian	0	Steady	68	0.2	N/A
TUSC	0	Steady	31	0.1	–0.7
Total	10	Steady	44,250		

Division results

Bisley and Painswick
Party	Candidate	Votes	%	±%
Conservative	Susan Williams	2,386	47	−3
Green	Alan Mossman	2,001	39	+11
Labour Co-op	Helen Fenton	694	14	+14
Majority		385	8	−14
Turnout		5,081	52	
Conservative hold		Swing		

Cam Valley
Party	Candidate	Votes	%	±%
Conservative	Brian Tipper	2,431	55	+1
Labour Co-op	Natalie Bennett	1,231	28	−8
Green	Martyn Cutcher	417	9	+9
Liberal Democrats	Richard Blackwell-Whitehead	331	8	−2
Majority		1,200	27	+9
Turnout		4,410	42	
Conservative hold		Swing		

Dursley
Party	Candidate	Votes	%	±%
Labour Co-op	Wendy Thomas	2,080	50.45	+12
Conservative	Loraine Patrick	2,043	49.55	+5
Majority		37	0.90	−6
Turnout		4,123	45	
Labour gain from Conservative		Swing		

Hardwicke and Severn
Party	Candidate	Votes	%	±%
Conservative	Stephen Davies	2,197	61	+3
Labour	Oakley Pollard	857	24	+8
Liberal Democrats	Mike Stayte	551	15	−2
Majority		1,340	37	−4
Turnout		3,605	39	
Conservative hold		Swing		

Minchinhampton
Party	Candidate	Votes	%	±%
Green	Chloe Turner	3,390	61	+11
Conservative	Julia Judd	2,041	37	−13
Freedom Alliance	Karen McWalter	103	2	+2
Majority		1,349	24	+24
Turnout		5,534	54	
Green hold		Swing		

Nailsworth
Party	Candidate	Votes	%	±%
Labour Co-op	Steve Robinson	2,582	54	+12
Conservative	Ewan Denning	1,732	37	−1
Liberal Democrats	Rhianna Wilsher	424	9	±0
Majority		850	17	+13
Turnout		4,738	52	
Labour hold		Swing		

Rodborough
Party	Candidate	Votes	%	±%
Labour Co-op	John Bloxsom	1,598	35	−10
Conservative	Bob Trusty	1,306	29	−2
Green	Philip Blomberg	1,048	23	+8
Independent	Graham Stanley	415	9	+9
Liberal Democrats	Adam Cain	125	3	−6
Heritage	Richard Nurse	68	1	+1
Majority		292	6	−8
Turnout		4,560	44	
Labour hold		Swing		

Stonehouse
Party	Candidate	Votes	%	±%
Conservative	Nicholas Housden	1,244	43	+11
Labour Co-op	Taz Jones	790	27	−19
Green	Carol Kambites	651	22	+14
Liberal Democrats	Robert Jewell	128	4	−3
Libertarian	Glenville Gogerly	68	2	−4
TUSC	Chris Moore	31	1	+1
Majority		454	16	+2
Turnout		2,912	37	
Conservative gain from Labour		Swing		

Stroud Central
Party	Candidate	Votes	%	±%
Labour Co-op	David Drew	2,265	43.90	+14
Green	Molly Scott Cato	1,668	32.33	−9
Conservative	Anthony Blackburn	1,019	19.75	−4
Freedom Alliance	Arthur Edwards	118	2.29	+2
Liberal Democrats	George James	90	1.76	−4
Majority		597	11.57	
Turnout		5,160	49	
Labour gain from Green		Swing		

Wotton-under-Edge
Party	Candidate	Votes	%	±%
Liberal Democrats	Linda Cohen	1,899	46	−1
Conservative	Graham Smith	1,777	43	+2
Labour	David Carter	451	11	+2
Majority		122	3	−3
Turnout		4,127	48	
Liberal Democrats hold		Swing		

=== Tewkesbury ===
Tewkesbury district summary
Party	Seats	+/-	Votes	%	+/-
Conservative	4	▼2	13,079	47.4	–10.1
Liberal Democrats	2	▲1	8,440	30.6	+7.4
Green	1	▲1	3,065	11.1	+7.0
Labour	0	Steady	2,932	10.6	+2.2
Freedom Alliance	0	Steady	65	0.2	N/A
Total	7	Steady	27,581		

Division results

Bishop's Cleeve
Party	Candidate	Votes	%	±%
Liberal Democrats	Alex Hegenbarth	2,655	54	+27
Conservative	Robert Bird	1,910	39	−22
Labour	Andrew Williams	327	7	−1
Freedom Alliance	Richard Brooke	65	1	+1
Majority		745	15	−19
Turnout		4,957	40.39	
Liberal Democrats gain from Conservative		Swing		

Brockworth
Party	Candidate	Votes	%	±%
Conservative	Robert Vines	2,073	53	±0
Labour	Joe Ambrose	967	25	+25
Liberal Democrats	Clare Softley	846	22	−10
Majority		1,106	28	+7
Turnout		3,886	32.28	
Conservative hold		Swing		

Churchdown
Party	Candidate	Votes	%	±%
Liberal Democrats	Ben Evans	1,978	59	+8
Conservative	Paul Grierson	1,003	30	−10
Labour	Rosy Varden	234	7	−2
Green	Campbell Milne	149	4	+4
Majority		975	29	+18
Turnout		3,364	40.14	
Liberal Democrats hold		Swing		

Highnam
Party	Candidate	Votes	%	±%
Conservative	Phil Awford	2,723	66.22	−5
Green	Su Billington	492	11.96	+5
Liberal Democrats	Martin Griffiths	458	11.14	+1
Labour	Stephen Miller	439	10.68	−2
Majority		2,231	54.26	−4
Turnout		4,112	37.69	
Conservative hold		Swing		

Tewkesbury
Party	Candidate	Votes	%	±%
Green	Cate Cody	1,781	52	+52
Conservative	Kevin Cromwell	1,444	42	+1
Labour	Simon O’Rourke	219	6	−3
Majority		337	10	+8
Turnout		3,444	41.43	
Green gain from Conservative		Swing		

Tewkesbury East
Party	Candidate	Votes	%	±%
Conservative	Vernon Smith	1,510	46	−18
Liberal Democrats	Christopher Coleman	1,145	35	+18
Labour	Zoe Darlington	328	10	−4
Green	Jan Millett	269	8	+3
Majority		365	11	−36
Turnout		3,252	35.14	
Conservative hold		Swing		

Winchcombe and Woodmancote
Party	Candidate	Votes	%	±%
Conservative	David Gray	2,416	53	−11
Liberal Democrats	Nigel Adcock	1,358	30	+5
Labour	Susan Sturgeon	418	9	+2
Green	Stuart Galey	374	8	+3
Majority		1,058	23	−16
Turnout		4,566	44.90	
Conservative hold		Swing		

== Changes 2021–2025 ==
- Alistair Chambers, elected as a Conservative, became an independent in February 2022.
- Sue Williams, elected as a Conservative, joined the Green Party in May 2024. As a result of this change, the Conservatives lost their majority and the council went under no overall control.

Highnam By-Election 4 May 2023
Party	Candidate	Votes	%	±%
Conservative	Paul McLain	2,041	50.7	−15.5
Liberal Democrats	James Joyce	1,411	35.1	+24.0
Green	Jonathan Bristow	572	14.2	+2.2
Majority		630	15.7	
Turnout		4,024		
Conservative hold		Swing		
