= Gloucestershire County Council =

Local authority in England

Type
- Type: Non-metropolitan county

Leadership
- Chair: Sarah Hands, Liberal Democrats since 13 May 2026
- Leader: Lisa Spivey, Liberal Democrats since 21 May 2025
- Chief Executive: Jo Walker since 19 May 2025

Structure
- Seats: 55 councillors
- Graph of the party split among 55 seats.
- Political groups: Administration (27) Liberal Democrats (27) Other parties (28) Reform (9) Green (9) Conservative (6) Labour (1) Restore (1) Independent (2)
- Length of term: 4 years

Elections
- Voting system: First past the post
- Last election: 1 May 2025
- Next election: 2029 (as Gloucestershire Council)

Meeting place
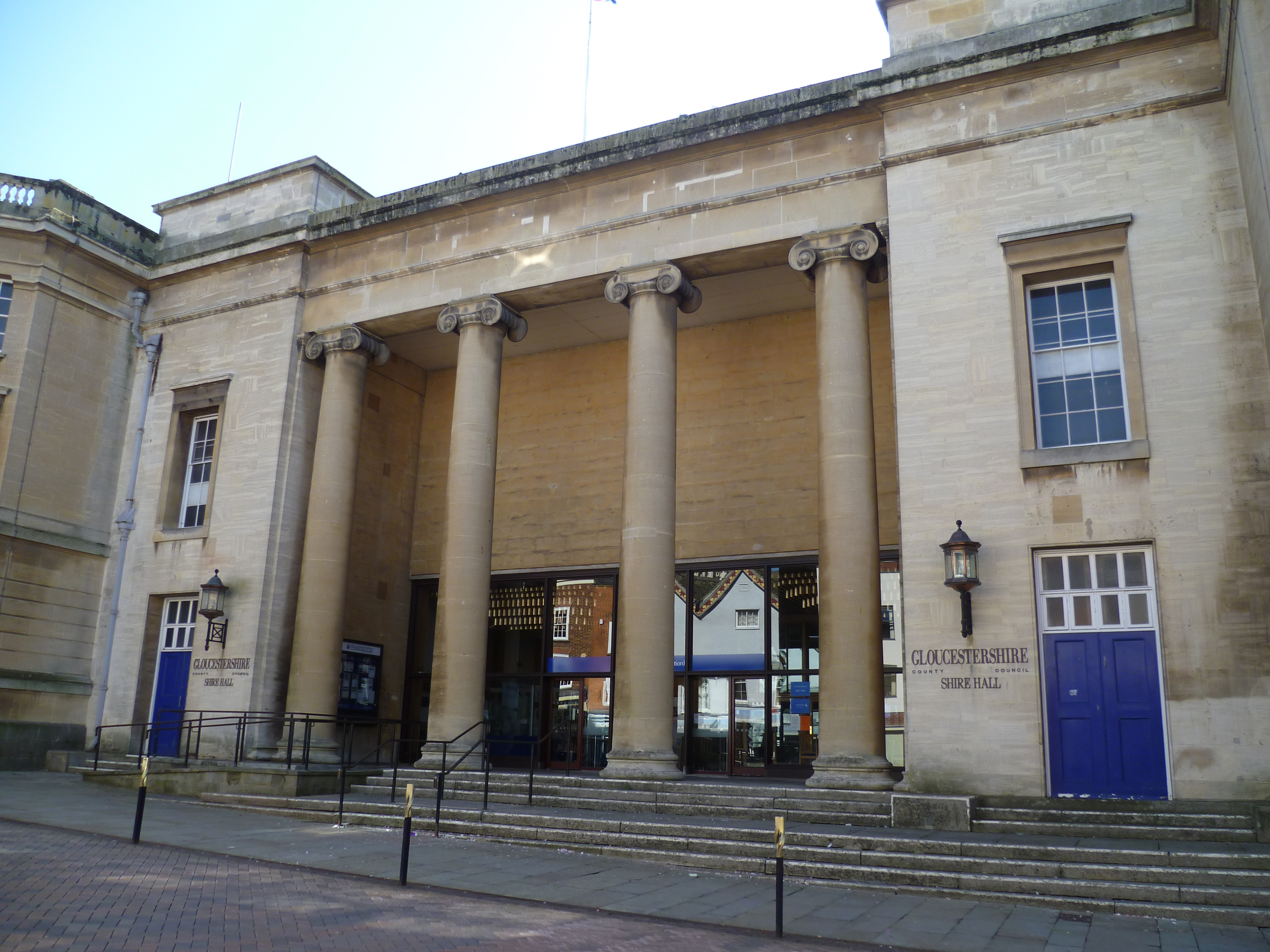
- Shire Hall, Westgate Street, Gloucester, GL1 2TG

Website
- www.gloucestershire.gov.uk

Gloucestershire County Council is the upper-tier local authority for the non-metropolitan county of Gloucestershire, in England. The council was created in 1889. The council's principal functions are county roads and rights of way, social services, education and libraries, but it also provides many other local government services in the area it covers. The non-metropolitan county is smaller than the ceremonial county, the latter additionally including South Gloucestershire. The council has been under no overall control since May 2024. Following the 2025 election a minority Liberal Democrat administration formed to run the council. It is based at Shire Hall in Gloucester.

The area administered by the county council comprises 2,653 square kilometres (1,024 sq mi).

The current Gloucestershire County Council is planned to be abolished on 1 April 2028 and replaced by a new unitary authority Gloucestershire Council.

== History ==
Elected county councils were created in 1889 under the Local Government Act 1888, taking over many administrative functions that had previously been performed by unelected magistrates at the Quarter Sessions. The cities of Bristol and Gloucester were both considered large enough to provide their own county-level services, so they became county boroughs, independent from the county council. The county council was elected by and provided services to the remainder of the county outside those two boroughs, which area was termed the administrative county.

The first elections were held in January 1889, and the council formally came into being on 1 April 1889, when it held its first official meeting at Shire Hall in Gloucester. The first chairman of the council was John Dorington, a Conservative, who was also the Member of Parliament for Tewkesbury at the time.

Local government was reformed in 1974 under the Local Government Act 1972, which made Gloucestershire a non-metropolitan county. As part of the 1974 changes it ceded an area in the south of the county to the new county of Avon, but gained the former county borough of Gloucester. The lower tier of local government was rearranged at the same time, with the county being divided into six non-metropolitan districts.

Avon was abolished in 1996 and a new unitary authority called South Gloucestershire created, covering the area which had been ceded from the old administrative county of Gloucestershire to Avon in 1974. As a unitary authority South Gloucestershire is independent from Gloucestershire County Council, although it is classed as part of the wider ceremonial county of Gloucestershire for the purposes of lieutenancy.

As part of upcoming local government reform in England, the two-tier Gloucestershire councils are due to be replaced by either one or two unitary councils. In March 2026, the leaders of Gloucestershire County Council, and five district councils in Gloucestershire, wrote a letter to local government ministers outlining the ambition for a single Gloucestershire unitary authority, with the ambition for it to join the West of England Combined Authority.In August 2026, Mayor Helen Godwin outlined that the addition of Gloucestershire to the West of England Combined Authority was unlikely in the near future but would not rule it out, stating that presently it was not a focus of WECA. Godwin stated that expansion of WECA to North Somerset was an immediate priority. Other options considered previously by Gloucestershire councils include a Three Counties combined authority with Herefordshire and Worcestershire, or joining the proposed Thames Valley Combined Authority.

=== Unitary Gloucestershire Council ===
Gloucestershire Council

Type
- Type: Unitary authority of Gloucestershire

History
- Preceded by: Gloucestershire County Council

Structure
- Length of term: 4 years

Elections
- Voting system: First past the post

Gloucestershire Council is expected to be a English unitary authority for the local government district of Gloucestershire, replacing the existing Gloucestershire County Council and its constituent district councils as part of a move to phase out two-tier local government. It is planned to have a leader and cabinet model of government. It will have 110 councillors.

As part of the Starmer ministry local government reform, a goal of "simpler local government structures" was set out by the government, including a commitment to phase out two-tier local government structures.

The first election was set to take place on 6 May 2027, with the authority taking over local government responsibilities on 1 April 2028.

In September 2026, the Gloucestershire proposals were halted by the government and placed under review. In October 2026, the plans were revived with the first election expected to take place in 2028 and the unitary authority established in 2029, subject to a three week consultation period.

== Political control ==
The council has been under no overall control since a change of allegiance in May 2024. Following the 2025 election the Liberal Democrats were the largest party on the council, but were one seat short of a majority. They formed a minority administration with informal support from Labour (whose only councillor was made chairman of the council) and the Green Party.

Political control of the council since the 1974 reforms has been as follows:

Party in control	Years
No overall control	1974–2005
Conservative	2005–2013
No overall control	2013–2017
Conservative	2017–2024
No overall control	2024–present

=== Leadership ===
The leaders of the council since 2001 have been:

Councillor	Party	From	To
Peter Clarke	Labour	3 Sep 2001	Apr 2005
Peter Clarke	Independent	Apr 2005	May 2005
Barry Dare	Conservative	18 May 2005	19 May 2010
Mark Hawthorne	Conservative	19 May 2010	11 Sep 2024
Stephen Davies	Conservative	11 Sep 2024	May 2025
Lisa Spivey	Liberal Democrats	21 May 2025	

=== Composition ===
Following the 2025 election, and subsequent by-elections and changes of allegiance up to July 2026, the composition of the council was:

Party	Councillors
Liberal Democrats	27
Reform	9
Green	9
Conservative	6
Labour	1
Restore UK	1
Independent	2
Total	55

== Premises ==
The county council has its headquarters at Shire Hall on Westgate Street in Gloucester. The building had originally been built in 1816 as a courthouse and had served as the meeting place for the quarter sessions which preceded the county council. The county council then used the Shire Hall as its meeting place and built various extensions to accommodate its offices. Most of the building was demolished and rebuilt in the 1960s behind the retained façade of the 1816 building, with the reconstructed building being completed in 1970.

== Elections ==
Since the last boundary changes in May 2025, the council has comprised 55 councillors, each representing an electoral division. Elections are held every four years.

== Notable members ==
- Thomas Davies, later member of parliament for Cirencester and Tewkesbury
- David Drew (born 1952), later member of parliament for Stroud
- Sir Henry Elwes (born 1935), later Lord Lieutenant of Gloucestershire
- Julie Girling (born 1956), later a Member of the European Parliament for South West England
- Margaret Hills (born 1882) first female councillor on Stroud Urban District Council and a suffragist.
- Nigel Jones (born 1948), later member of parliament for Cheltenham and a life peer

== See also ==
- Category:Councillors in Gloucestershire
