= James Holder (businessman) =

British businessman (born 1971)

- Born: James Michael Holder; December 1971 (age 54); Studley, Warwickshire, England
- Known for: Co-founder of Superdry & Co

James Michael Holder is a British businessman and convicted rapist, who co-founded the fashion brand Superdry & Co.

== Early life ==
Born in Studley, Warwickshire, he was brought up in Stratford-upon-Avon and went to college in Leamington Spa where he studied graphic design. As a teenager, he enjoyed reading comics.

Holder started his career in fashion by selling T-shirts from the back of his mother's car at BMX events. He went on to found the skateboarder label Bench. He was made bankrupt in 1998. While running Bench, Holder met Julian Dunkerton, who made a large order of Holder's products. They later travelled to Japan together before founding Superdry.

== Career ==
In 2003, Holder co-founded Superdry with Julian Dunkerton as a market stall in Cheltenham. In 2004, they opened the brand's first physical store in Covent Garden, London. Holder was responsible for clothing design and brand development at the company.

Holder said that he and Dunkerton spotted a "huge gap" in the UK men's market. He has said that the initial inspiration for the brand was Dunkerton's love of Americana and his love of Japan and typography.

In 2005, Superdry experienced a period of growth after David Beckham was seen wearing the brand.

In 2010, the business was floated. Holder led Superdry's product innovation division until 2016. Holder also led SuperDesignLab, which was responsible for launching spin-off brand Superdry Sport.

In 2016, Holder resigned from the company, but as of 2018 continued to hold a stake.

In 2018, Holder joined fellow co-founder Julian Dunkerton in criticising Superdry's business strategy, claiming that it was unable to compete with ASOS.com.

== Personal life ==
As of 2017, he lived with his wife Charlotte, a lawyer, and their son and daughter.

=== Rape conviction ===
In April 2026, Holder appeared at Gloucester Crown Court charged with raping a woman in Cheltenham in May 2022. On 1 May 2026, a jury of seven men and five women found him guilty of rape, while acquitting him of a separate count of assault by penetration. Holder was refused bail prior to sentencing on the grounds that he might be a flight risk. On 7 May 2026, Holder was sentenced to eight years in prison.
