= Jade Holland Cooper =

British fashion designer (born 1986)

- Born: Jade Abigail Cooper; December 1986 (age 39); Ipswich, Suffolk, England
- Education: Ipswich High School for Girls
- Alma mater: Royal Agricultural College (dropped out)
- Occupation: Fashion designer
- Spouse: Julian Dunkerton (m. 2018)
- Children: 2

Jade Abigail Holland Cooper (born December 1986) is a British fashion designer.

== Early life ==
Her father, Oliver Cooper, is a farmer in Suffolk, and her mother, Miranda (née Holland), worked in London and Paris as a designer, making clothes for Elton John, amongst others. She was born on the family farm, Manor Farm, in Elmsett, near Hadleigh.

Oliver Cooper grew up on Great Bricett Hall Farm, including the grade I listed farmhouse Great Bricett Hall in the village of Great Bricett, Suffolk. It was home to his father Rupert Cooper, who died in October 2017, aged 96. The estate, including 415 acres of land, was listed for sale in June 2018 at £4.65 million.

She was educated at Ipswich High School for Girls, then studied international equine and agriculture management at the Royal Agricultural College in Cirencester, but dropped out to start a career in fashion.

== Career ==
In 2008, she founded the fashion label Holland Cooper. Holland Cooper launched her label by personally selling tweed garments from a horse trailer at equestrian and country events, travelling to more than 30 shows per year.

She started by having an outworker employed by her mother make 30 tweed miniskirts, with leather and suede additions, which she found in her mother's old design studio in a farm outbuilding, and sold them all from a stall at Badminton Horse Trials.

Holland Cooper has since grown into a fashion house with an annual turnover of around £60 million and year-on-year growth of 50 percent. The brand offers more than 2,000 products and operates a 70,000-square-foot headquarters in the Cotswolds.

Holland Cooper operates two retail shops: one at Bicester Village and a flagship store at Dunkerton Park, a retail complex in Cheltenham co-owned by her husband, Julian Dunkerton. The company is the official fashion partner of the Cheltenham Festival. Holland Cooper was also named to Drapers' 30 Under 30 list in 2014.

== Public image ==
Holland Cooper's designs have been worn by Catherine, Princess of Wales, at public engagements.

== Personal life ==
In August 2018, she married Julian Dunkerton, co-founder of Superdry. The couple live in the Cotswolds in a Grade I-listed 16th-century manor, reported to be valued at £50 million.

They have two children, born November 2020 and December 2022.

In 2021, she was one of the guests at Lady Kitty Spencer's wedding.
