= Woolverstone Hall =

Country house in Suffolk, England

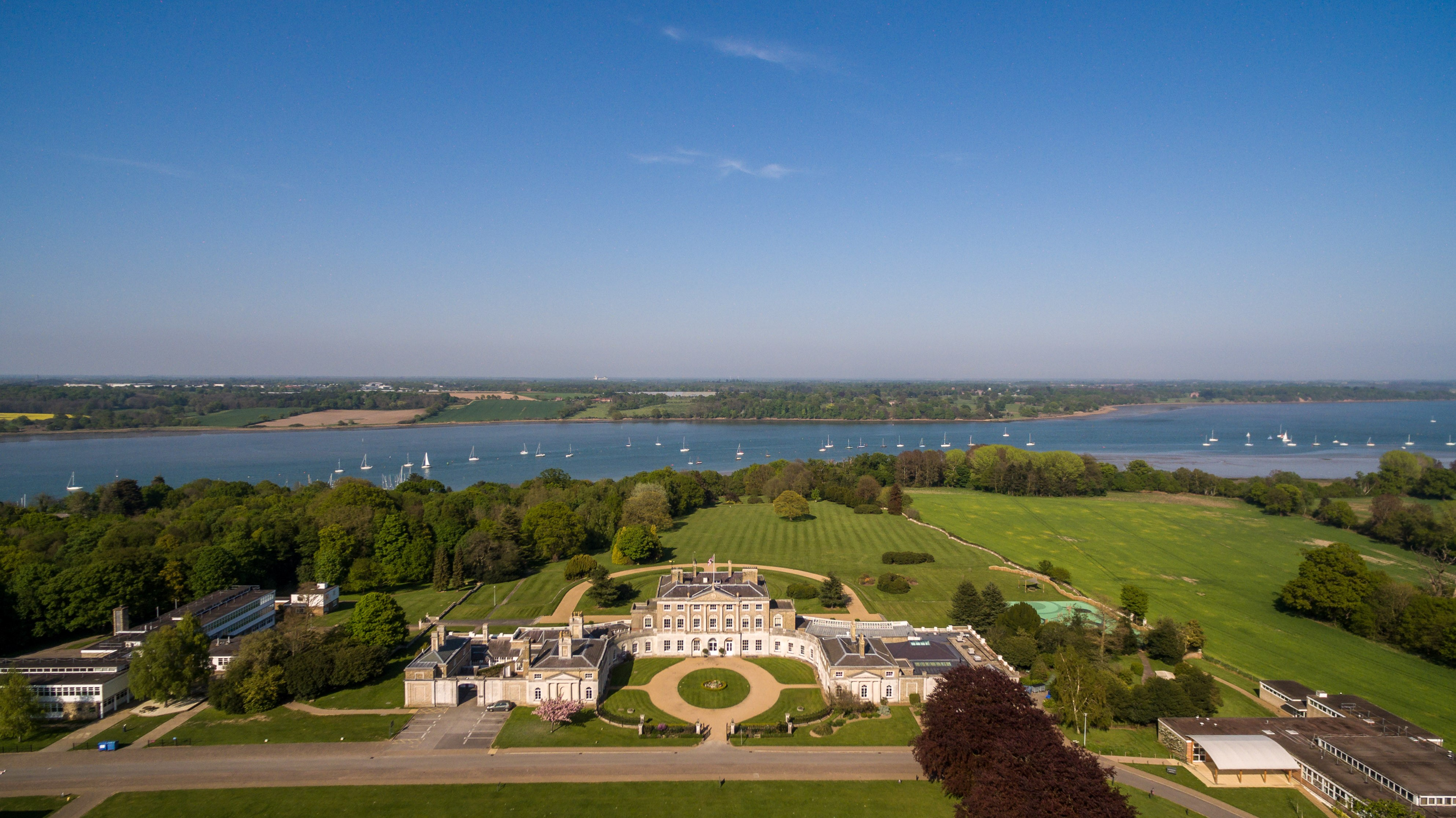
Woolverstone Hall on the banks of the River Orwell

Woolverstone Hall is a large country house, now in use as a school and available at times as a function venue, located 5 miles (8.0 km) south of the centre of Ipswich, Suffolk, England. It is set in 80 acres (320,000 m^{2}) on the banks of the River Orwell. Built in 1776 for William Berners by the architect John Johnson of Leicestershire, it is an outstanding example of English Palladian architecture and is a Grade I listed building while associated buildings are Grade II. From 1951 to 1990, it housed Woolverstone Hall School, a boarding school operated by London County Council (LCC).

== History ==
It has been speculated that a Viking chieftain named Wulf sacrificed a native villager on a glacial monolithic stone, giving rise to the name Wulf's stone. Domesday Book recorded two manors in the area which were merged in the 13th century and presided over by a succession of families until 1773, when it was purchased for £14,000 by William Berners (died 1783). William Berners owned Berners Street in London, which became known later for the Berners Street Hoax. He erected Woolverstone Hall in 1776. A 96 feet (29 m) high obelisk was erected in 1793 to William's memory by his son, Charles Berners (1767–1831), High Sheriff of Suffolk, which was damaged and demolished during World War II. In 1823, alterations and additions were done by Thomas Hoppe, including side wings.

The estate passed to Charles's brother and, in the 1880s, Henry Denny Berners, LL.B., Archdeacon of Suffolk, resided at Woolverstone Hall. His son John became the next owner, followed in 1886 by John's brother, Hugh Berners (died 1891), a Royal Navy captain. The estate became the seat of Charles Hugh Berners, High Steward for Harwich, Essex, great-grandson of William Berners. The manor was sold to Oxford University in 1937. It was requisitioned as a naval training establishment during World War II and, in 1950, the London County Council took it over as a boys' boarding school – Woolverstone Hall School. In 1992, the property was sold to the Girls' Day School Trust, who relocated Ipswich High School to Woolverstone Hall. In 2017, the property and school were purchased by Ipswich Education Ltd., a subsidiary of the China-oriented investment banker London & Oxford Group.

Woolverstone Hall became a Grade I listed building on 22 February 1955.

== Architecture and fittings ==
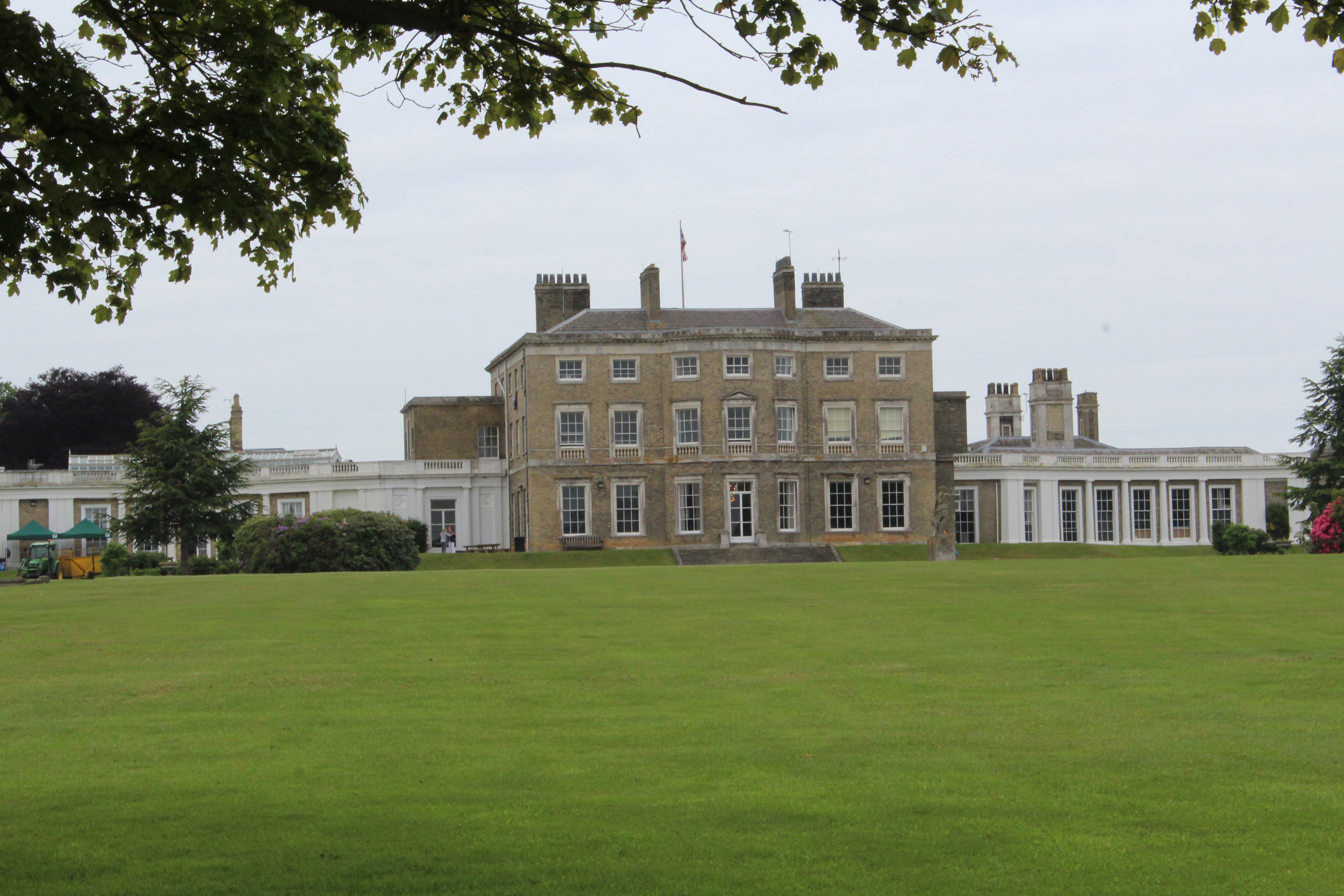
Rear view of Woolverstone Hall

Woolverstone Hall comprises a central block with flanking wings connected by colonnades. The central block is of three storeys: a rusticated basement, first floor and attic, and has at its front centre a pediment supported by four Ionic columns. The house is built of Woolpit brick, with Coade stone ornamentation. The main living areas were originally in the central block while the wings contained offices, the kitchen, larders, laundry room, and a brewhouse. A 20th-century renovation added two-storey single-bay links to wings, and the attic.

Internally, the building still contains the original Adam style fireplaces and ceilings decorated with gold leaf. The modest staircase has a wrought-iron honeysuckle balustrade.

The apartments contain a collection of paintings by ancient and modern artists. The music room has been converted to become the Head's study.

== Grounds ==
Originally situated in a 400-acre wooded park extending to the River Orwell, it sat opposite Orwell Park, and contained a herd of fallow deer. The curved front offers views of the river and the Nacton shore.
