= Superdry & Co =

English clothing company

Superdry Limited
- Trade name: Superdry & Co
- Type: Private
- Traded as: LSE: SDRY (delisted)
- Industry: Clothing
- Genre: Streetwear
- Founded: 2003; 23 years ago
- Founders: Ian Hibbs; Julian Dunkerton; James Holder; Theo Karpathios
- Headquarters: Cheltenham, England
- Key people: Peter Sjölander (chairman); Julian Dunkerton (Chief executive officer)
- Products: Clothing
- Revenue: ▲£622.5 million (2023)
- Operating income: ▼£(13.3) million (2023)
- Net income: ▼£(148.1) million (2023)
- Website: superdry.com

Superdry Limited (formerly stylised as SUPERDRY®︎冒険魂) is a British clothing company, and owner of the Superdry & Co label. Superdry products traditionally combine vintage American styling with Japanese-inspired graphics. Despite the brand's signature Japanese lettering, Superdry has never expanded into Japan.

Founded in 2003, in its peak years, Superdry was a popular, status symbol high street fashion brand, sold in 157 countries, selling its clothes at high prices, and described as the "hottest fashion label on the high street". However, as of 2024, years of internal problems and falling sales have seen the brand in turmoil. The company was delisted from the London Stock Exchange in July 2024. In 2025, the company rebranded to Superdry & Co.

== History ==
=== 2003–2011: Creation and meteoric rise ===
Clothing brand Cult Clothing Co was established by Ian Hibbs and Julian Dunkerton in Cheltenham in 1985. During this period, Dunkerton met James Holder, who at the time was running skatewear brand Bench. In 2003, they joined forces with businessman Theo Karpathios to found Superdry, opening the first Superdry store in London's Covent Garden in 2004. The company got its name after the founders "collected tons of packaging for food and from shops" in Tokyo, many of which had names beginning with "Super". Some of Superdry's products are vegan.

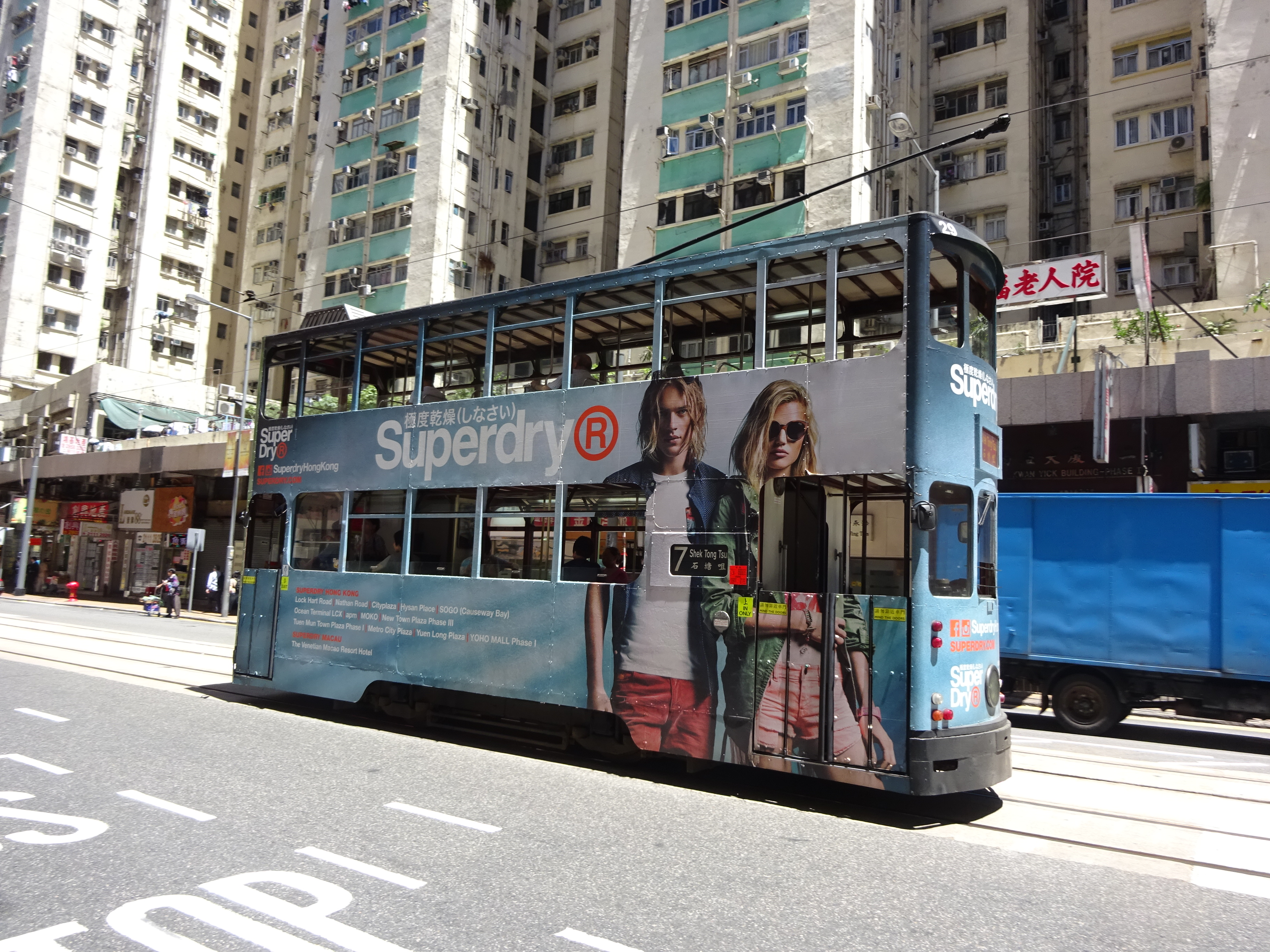
A Superdry advert

The next few years saw a meteoric rise of Superdry as a brand, as it gained a reputation as a high status, sought-after brand of clothing. Celebrities seen wearing Superdry included Leonardo DiCaprio, Pixie Lott and Kate Winslet. David Beckham was a notable fan of the brand in its early years, with the footballer regularly pictured in Superdry clothing. When Beckham was pictured wearing a Superdry Brad leather jacket in 2007, demand for the item surged. By 2009, over 70,000 Brad leather jackets had been sold, with a further 25,000 on order. The popularity of the Brad leather jacket led to Primark launching a very similar jacket, and Superdry taking legal action against them, reaching an out-of-court settlement. Superdry was described by some as a UK version of Abercrombie & Fitch, though critics suggested the heavy dependence on branded hoodies put it at risk of falling foul of fast-changing fashions. Superdry heavily invested in advertising their products.

With Theo Karpathios as director, a nationwide then global expansion of Superdry took place. In 2009, Superdry was described by The Guardian as "one of the fastest growing (brands) in the UK". The rapid rise of the company saw it described as a 'phenomenon'. The business was floated on the London Stock Exchange in March 2010, becoming a stock market darling after having been floated at £5 and reaching £18.98 by early 2011. Rapid expansion saw Superdry reach 76 shops and 74 concessions in the UK as well as 116 overseas in 2011.

=== 2011–2020: Problems, upheaval, and decline ===
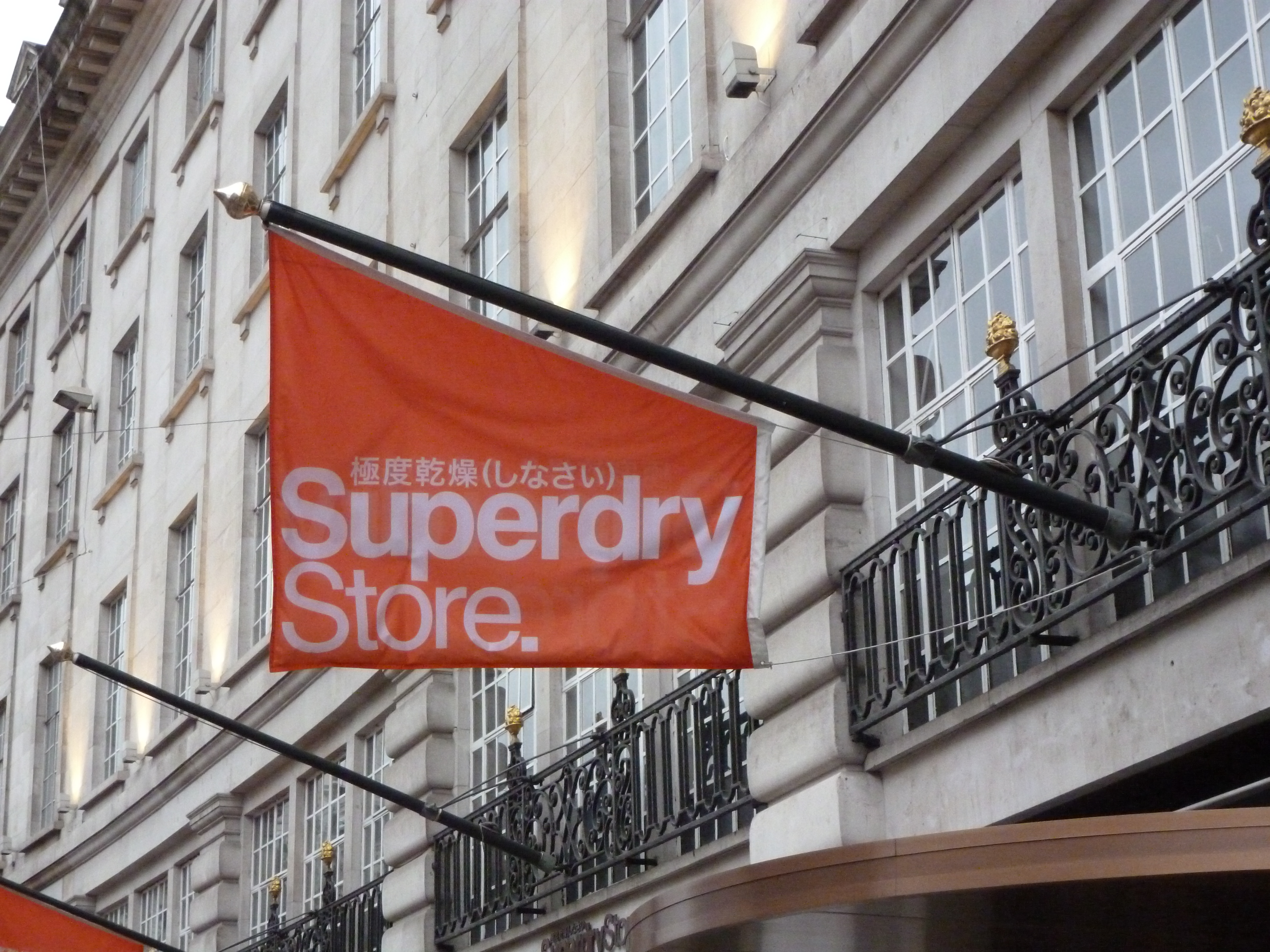
Flag over the Regent Street Superdry store in London

In the second half of 2011, after years of rapid expansion, Superdry experienced its first difficulties, with sales growth below the rate of expansion. Slowing sales caused the company to review its 2012 plans to open 20 more stores. By 2012, all of Dunkerton's Cult Clothing stores had been rebranded as Superdry stores. At the start of 2012, Superdry issued a profits warning, and share price slumped to £2.92, down from a high of £15.84 in February 2011. In August 2012, co-founder and company director Theo Karpathios quit. On 22 October 2014, it was announced that Dunkerton had stepped down as CEO of Superdry and been replaced by Euan Sutherland, the ex-CEO of The Co-operative Group.

In 2015, the company was reported to have had a 'difficult few months'. They announced they would be making actor Idris Elba the face of a new premium range of clothing, with CEO Sutherland saying: "He epitomises what we are: British, grounded and cool." In February 2016, brand founder Dunkerton sold four million shares at £12 per share (for a total of £48 million), but remained the largest shareholder with a 27% stake in the group. In mid-2017, Superdry was reported in The Guardian as a 'winner of Brexit, with sales having increased by 42.9% to nearly £250m, and retail sales rising 20.6% to £501.6m. The Guardian reported that with 60% of their sales overseas, Superdry had benefited from the fall in the pound since the Brexit referendum of June 2016, with the British pound down 12% against the US dollar. Superdry sales jumped 42.9% to nearly £250m retail sales rose 20.6% to £501.6m. The success of the company's collaboration with Idris Elba was also cited. By the end of 2017, Superdry shares had reached their highest yet, at over £19 per share.

On 8 January 2018, SuperGroup plc changed its name to Superdry plc. In 2018, the company was valued at £1.7bn; however, from 2018, the company was widely reported to be experiencing problems, and declining sales. By the end of 2018, Superdry shares were trading at £4.67, less than a quarter of their level one year before. In April 2019, Dunkerton won his bid to be reinstated to the board of the company, however his return caused the company's chairman Peter Bamford, and most of the board to resign. In October 2019, after a period as interim CEO from April 2019, Dunkerton was appointed as permanent CEO, despite his having pledged to appoint a new CEO. Dunkerton set about implementing his strategy to reverse the decline of the brand, pulling out of a footwear licensing deal with Pentland, cancelling a planned kidswear range, and expressing his desire to focus on the jackets and hoodies the brand is known for.

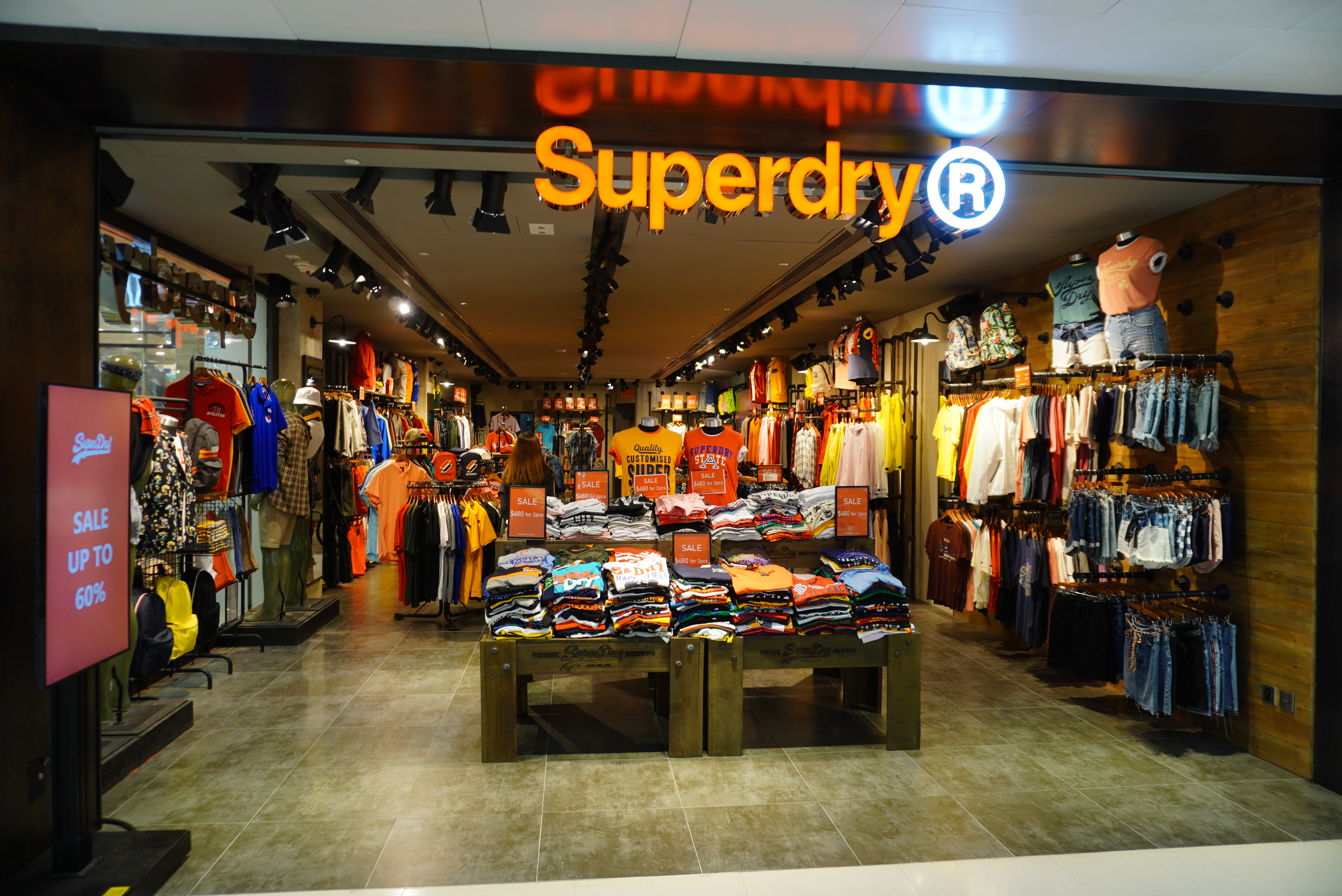
A Superdry store

Speaking to Retail Gazette in January 2020, Hilary Collins, founder of Big Wave PR said: "Trendsetters used to want to be seen in the latest Superdry sweatshirt or coat, but, in recent years, their sweaters have been donned by mums and dads on shopping trips to supermarkets - not the style conscious." Excessive diversification of the brand, with the launching of lines such as water bottles, pencil cases, watches, and USB sticks, was also cited as a factor. Further, Superdry's reliance on name, over quality and design, and positioning of itself as a premium brand when consumers did not share that perception had led to confusion as to why the brand's clothing was so expensive. Dunkerton's strategy of focusing on full-price sales led to the chain experiencing a decrease in sales over the 2019 Christmas period, as other brands cut prices. In March 2020, Superdry shares were down to £1.07 a share.

=== 2021–present: Turmoil and uncertain future ===
In October 2020, Superdry launched another collection with Idris Elba. However, the second Elba Superdry collection would not notably alleviate the problems facing the company. In January 2021, Superdry warned of "continued uncertainty and disruption", which it attributed to COVID-19, and the impact of continued shop closures leading to a sharp drop in sales. However, the company stated that they were in a strong position for a turnaround. After some signs of sales recovery, Superdry shares climbed to £4.31 a share in June 2021, however they would go on a downward curve after this. In September 2023, the company's share listing on the London Stock Exchange was temporarily suspended after an audit delay. With COVID measures easing in the second half of 2021, Superdry seemed to be making a strong comeback, with sales up 21%, and the announcement of a new flagship store in Oxford Street, London. At this time, the brand also announced a £1 million, 12-month deal with Brooklyn Beckham as a 'brand ambassador'. Announcing the Beckham partnership at the flagship Superdry Oxford Street store, Dunkerton stated: "As a business, we want to effect positive change for present and future generations, a generation that Brooklyn is speaking to." Beckham went on to upload photos of himself wearing Superdry clothes to his Instagram account, however, his use of animal products in his online cooking videos led to a reported conflict of interest with Superdry's vegan values, and his contract was terminated after only eight months.

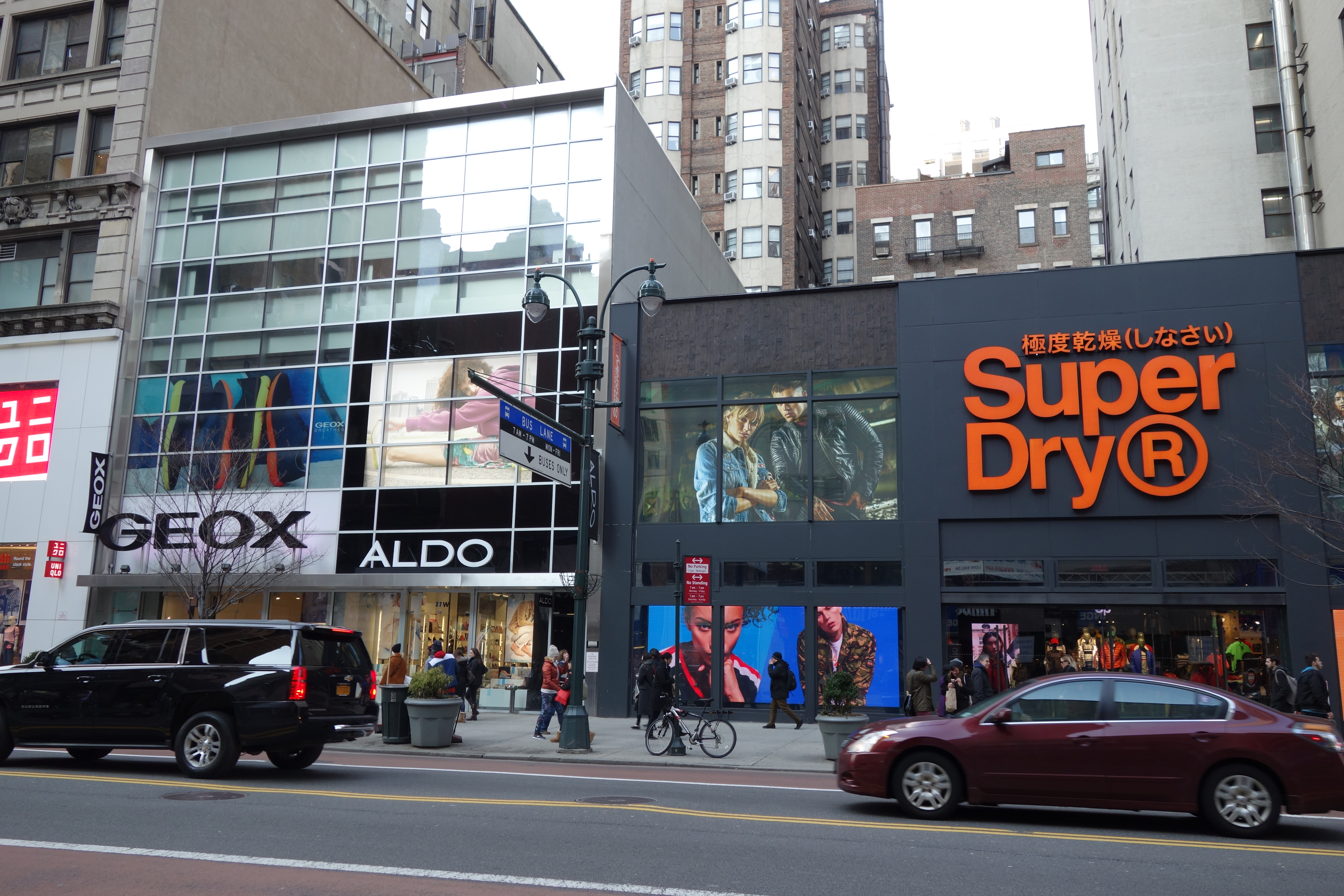
A Superdry store in New York

2022 saw a post-COVID recovery for the company, as it posted a £22.4m profit, however, 2023 would see Superdry slump to a £148m loss, stating it expected sluggish sales for the year, attributing this to poor weather, volatile trading conditions, and the cost of living crisis. In 2023, the company took out several loans, including a £25m overdraft with restructuring specialist Hilco, and implemented a £35m cost-cutting drive that included head office redundancies, and selling rights to its brand in some Asia Pacific countries in a $50m (£39m) deal with the South Korean firm Cowell Fashion Company. In January 2024, with sales having fallen 23.5% in the previous year to £219.8 million (€260 million), the company was reported to be considering insolvency. In 2023, the company was valued at £40m, down from a peak of £1.7 billion in 2018.

At the end of January 2024, it was announced that Chief Financial Officer Shaun Wills would be stepping down, marking the fourth financial chief to leave the company in a previous five years of turmoil for the company. Wills' departure, after his second spell at the troubled company, came as the company was reported to be "struggling to reignite consumer interest in the brand", and reportedly beginning talks to sell their brand rights in the U.S. and Middle East. The company has pledged to make £40m in savings this financial year, and embark upon a radical restructuring programme, involving store closures, and redundancies, having consulted with Pricewaterhouse Coopers. At the end of January, shares in the company, which had lost nearly 89% of their value in the previous 12 months, were up 0.7% at 17 pence. As of 2024, the company has 3,350 staff and more than 215 stores worldwide.

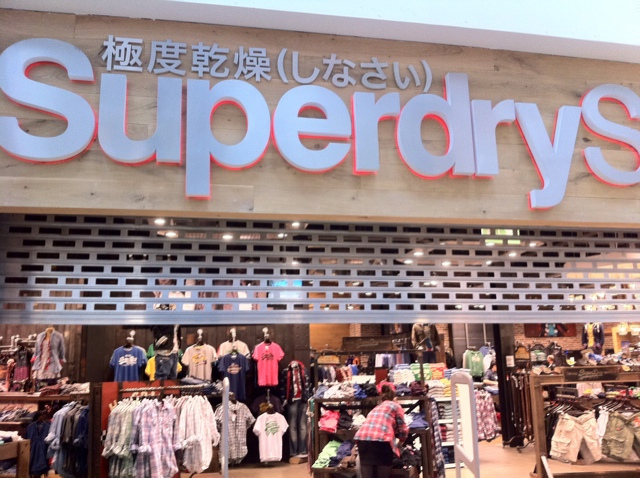
A Superdry store

The problems faced by Superdry have been compared to problems faced by other fashion retailers, such as Ted Baker, French Connection, Hunter Boot Ltd, Farfetch, and Matches Fashion, all of whom are either in serious financial trouble, or administration. Superdry's problems and uncertain future have also seen it compared to other failed UK retailers, such as The Body Shop, placed into administration in early 2024, and Lloyds Pharmacy, placed into liquidation in early 2024. Dunkerton's own role in the company's struggles has also come under scrutiny, with his role as CEO, and strategy to revive the ailing company having so far not produced the desired turnaround. Dunkerton himself has repeatedly spoken of his belief that he is the right person to turn Superdry's fortunes around, while admitting that recent years have been "bumpy" for the brand. Those years saw a number of Superdry shops close, including in the company's hometown of Cheltenham.

Superdry has been criticized for pricing out of sync with the status of the brand, uncertainty as to what the brand stands for and represents, and its place in the market. The Superdry brand has moved away from Japanese lettering, offering clothing both with and without Japanese writing. Superdry has commonly been described as having "fallen out of fashion". A 2023 Observer article referenced critics suggesting that Superdry was a "dad" brand "beyond redemption".

In late March 2024, it was announced that Dunkerton's proposed takeover bid for the troubled company would not go ahead. Dunkerton, who owns 26% of shares in the retailer, had been in discussions about raising funds to purchase the remaining Superdry shares, and taking the company private. Superdry released a statement separately saying that it had agreed to an extension of six months and an increase of up to £20 million ($25.3 million) to its secondary lending facility with Hilco Capital, allowing the company to continue trading, and that discussions with Dunkerton about the future of Superdry were continuing. Ongoing uncertainty about the future of the company has caused Superdry's shares to plunge in 2024. Superdry shares started the year at 33p, as of April they have fallen to 13p, valuing the company at about £12.8m.

By April 2024, Superdry's share price had collapsed, and the brand faced an uncertain future. The company was delisted from the London Stock Exchange as part of a plan to raise additional equity in July 2024. In 2025, the company rebranded to Superdry & Co.

== Marketing ==
Superdry does not advertise its products extensively and does not involve celebrities and influencers in sporadic advertising campaigns. However, the company's best-selling product, the Brad leather jacket, achieved a sales boom thanks to the famous footballer David Beckham who wore it in 2007.

Superdry products also often include decorative Japanese ideograms, intended to increase the brand's appeal. However, the Japanese text is generated by a machine translator and is nonsensical, the company revealed in 2011.

== See also ==
- Ben Sherman
- Burton (retailer)
- Castore
- Cool Japan
- Diesel (company)
- Fred Perry (clothing label)
- Marks & Spencer
- MUJI
- Next plc
- River Island
