= 1992 Cheltenham Borough Council election =

Cheltenham Borough Council election

The 1992 Cheltenham Council election took place on 7 May 1992 to elect members of Cheltenham Borough Council in Gloucestershire, England. One third of the council was up for election and, despite Conservative gains, the Liberal Democrats stayed in overall control of the council.

After the election, the composition of the council was

- Liberal Democrat 22
- Conservative 12
- Labour 3
- People Against Bureaucracy 3
- Independent 1

== Election result ==
Cheltenham local election result 1992
Party	Seats	Gains	Losses	Net gain/loss	Seats %	Votes %	Votes	+/−
Conservative	8	4	0	+4	61.5	46.8	15,391	
Liberal Democrats	3	0	3	-3	23.1	39.3	12,905	
Labour	1	0	0	-	7.7	7.0	2,313	
PAB	1	0	0	-	7.7	3.8	1,256	
Independent	0	0	1	-1	0.0	3.0	999	

== Ward results ==
All Saints
Party	Candidate	Votes	%	±%
Conservative	Daphne Pennell	1,241	48.9	+8.8
Liberal Democrats	Stephen Jordan*	1,068	42.1	−11.0
Labour	Alan Powell	230	9.1	−2.0
Majority		173	6.8	
Turnout		2,539	37.91	
Conservative gain from Liberal Democrats		Swing		

Charlton Kings
Party	Candidate	Votes	%	±%
Conservative	William Todman*	2,137	58.9	+14.2
Liberal Democrats	Christopher Morris	1,386	38.2	−12.1
Labour	Mary Daniel	103	2.8	−2.2
Majority		751	20.7	
Turnout		3,626	57.13	
Conservative hold		Swing		

College
Party	Candidate	Votes	%	±%
Conservative	Leslie Freeman*	2,001	57.1	+8.7
Liberal Democrats	Michael Parker	1,415	40.4	−11.2
Labour	Gerald Long	88	2.5	N/A
Majority		586	16.7	
Turnout		3,504	51.63	
Conservative hold		Swing		

Hatherley & The Reddings
Party	Candidate	Votes	%	±%
Conservative	Jacqueline Thorp	1,650	53.7	+10.0
Liberal Democrats	Mary Gray*	1,285	41.8	−2.8
Labour	Barry Leach	140	4.6	−6.7
Majority		365	11.9	
Turnout		3,075	40.76	
Conservative gain from Liberal Democrats		Swing		

Hesters Way
Party	Candidate	Votes	%	±%
Liberal Democrats	Clive Lloyd*	1,392	63.7	−5.2
Conservative	Reginald Built-Leonard	603	27.6	+9.8
Labour	Duane McClusky	189	8.7	−4.6
Majority		789	36.1	
Turnout		2,184	29.33	
Liberal Democrats hold		Swing		

Lansdown
Party	Candidate	Votes	%	±%
Conservative	Robert Wilson*	1,307	63.5	+14.2
Liberal Democrats	Philip Hart	616	29.9	−12.1
Labour	Robert Irons	134	6.5	−2.2
Majority		691	33.6	
Turnout		2,057	34.60	
Conservative hold		Swing		

Leckhampton with Up Hatherley
Party	Candidate	Votes	%	±%
Conservative	Kenneth Buckland	1,083	39.0	+0.3
Independent	David Hall*	999	36.0	−6.8
Liberal Democrats	Anne Regan	696	25.1	−21.0
Majority		84	3.0	
Turnout		2,778	48.50	
Conservative gain from Independent		Swing		

Park
Party	Candidate	Votes	%	±%
Conservative	William Bullingham*	1,584	57.7	+2.6
Liberal Democrats	Eric Phillips	1,051	38.3	−2.0
Labour	Julian Dunkerton	110	4.0	−0.5
Majority		533	19.4	
Turnout		2,745	47.36	
Conservative hold		Swing		

Pittville
Party	Candidate	Votes	%	±%
Labour	James Pennington*	783	36.1	−8.2
Conservative	Lorraine Pennell	761	35.1	+3.9
Liberal Democrats	Roger Jones	622	28.7	+4.2
Majority		22	1.0	
Turnout		2,166	35.97	
Labour hold		Swing		

Prestbury
Party	Candidate	Votes	%	±%
PAB	John Newman*	1,256	48.3	+6.6
Conservative	John Hamey	799	30.7	−2.5
Liberal Democrats	Ruth Holman	548	21.1	+1.2
Majority		457	17.6	
Turnout		2,603	44.06	
PAB hold		Swing		

St Mark's
Party	Candidate	Votes	%	±%
Liberal Democrats	Alexis Cassin*	1,135	67.7	+3.4
Conservative	Kaj Pedersen	367	21.9	+3.2
Labour	Andre Curtis	174	10.4	−6.6
Majority		768	45.8	
Turnout		1,676	30.56	
Liberal Democrats hold		Swing		

St Paul's
Party	Candidate	Votes	%	±%
Liberal Democrats	Elizabeth Clarke	820	47.9	−9.9
Conservative	Brian Gaylard	714	41.7	+15.3
Labour	Fiona Sewell	177	10.3	−5.5
Majority		106	6.2	
Turnout		1,711	29.63	
Liberal Democrats hold		Swing		

St Peter's
Party	Candidate	Votes	%	±%
Conservative	Roy Marchant	1,144	52.0	+16.9
Liberal Democrats	David Lawrence	871	39.6	−6.6
Labour	Clive Harriss	185	8.4	−10.3
Majority		273	12.4	
Turnout		2,200	37.57	
Conservative gain from Liberal Democrats		Swing		
