= Sandy Lister =

British field hockey player

Personal information
- Full name: Sandra Denise Lister
- Born: 16 August 1961 (age 64) Halifax, West Yorkshire

Sport
- Sport: Field hockey
Medal record
Women's field hockey
Representing Great Britain
Olympic Games
| Bronze medal – third place | 1992 Barcelona | Team |
Representing England
European Nations Cup
| Gold medal – first place | 1991 Brussels | Team |
| Silver medal – second place | 1987 London | Team |

Sandra Denise "Sandy" Lister (born 16 August 1961 in Halifax, West Yorkshire) is a British former field hockey player, who was a member of the British squad that won the bronze medal at the 1992 Summer Olympics in Barcelona. She competed in three consecutive Summer Olympics, starting in 1988. She then went into coaching with the Ipswich Ladies 1st Team for several years, winning the National Cup Title in 2002. She retired from professional coaching in 2007, although continues to teach at Ipswich High School, in Suffolk.
