= Peter Alexander (English actor) =

English actor and director

Peter Alexander (born 15 October 1952, Midsomer Norton, Somerset) is an English actor and director. He is probably best known for playing the character of Phil Pearce in Emmerdale Farm for three years.

He holds the unusual distinction of having appeared in all the main UK-made TV soap operas of the last 25 years, including EastEnders, Coronation Street, Brookside, Emmerdale and Hollyoaks.

He returned briefly to Emmerdale as a different character in 2006 for the King's River House explosion plotline.

He has appeared in many national touring theatrical productions, and in recent years has directed and starred in many pantomimes.

== Early life ==
He was born in Midsomer Norton but spent the first seven years of his life in nearby Peasedown St John, Somerset. He was one of five children, and his parents were May Alexandra and Thomas Henry Carlile. He attended boarding school at Woolverstone Hall School in Suffolk. After a spell at Chichester College he trained in drama at the Guildford School of Acting.

== Career ==
He has appeared in many UK TV series, notably as Phil Pearce in Emmerdale Farm.

More recently he has carved out a career as a performer and director of pantomime, notably at Leeds City Varieties theatre, Leeds and in Rochdale.

In 2008 he was employed as voice coach at Glyndebourne Festival Opera, with Sir Peter Hall's production of Albert Herring.

== TV and film appearances ==
- Premiere (1979)
- Coronation Street (1982)
- Minder (1984)
- Affairs of the Heart
- Emmerdale Farm (1983–1986)
- All Creatures Great and Small (1990)
- Medics (1990)
- Flash Back (1991)
- Singles (1991)
- Brookside (1993)
- Mission Top Secret (1994)
- EastEnders (1996)
- The Bill (1995–2000)
- Doctors (2003)
- Wallace & Gromit: The Curse of the Were-Rabbit (2005)
- Hollyoaks (2006)
- The Marchioness Disaster (2006)
- Emmerdale (2006)
- Heartbeat (1993–2007)
- The Royal Today (2008)
- Last Tango in Halifax (2016)

== Theatre career ==
He has appeared in many theatrical productions during his acting career. Notable examples include:

- Cinderella, Gracie Fields Theatre, Rochdale (2001)
- Allo Allo, national tour (2008)
- Porridge, The Lowry Theatre, Salford (part of national tour) (2010)

== Personal life ==
He is married to Penny Stevenson, who runs a dance school in Halifax. For more than 25 years they have lived in Luddendenfoot, Calderdale, Yorkshire. He has two children, Emily, an actress, and Nicholas, a doctor.

He is also a magistrate. He has been involved in relief work in Tanzania.
