= Woolverstone Hall School =

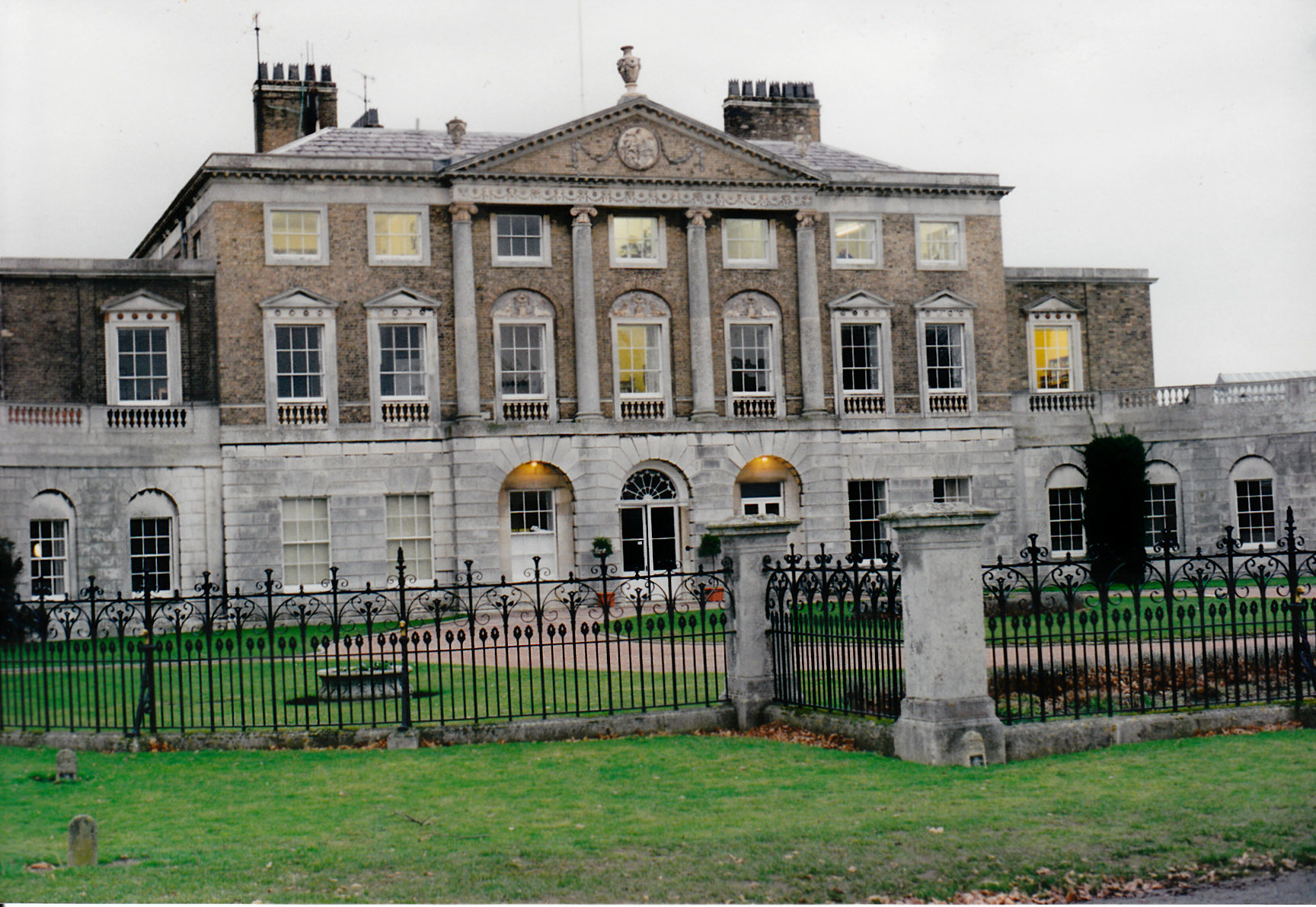

Location
- Woolverstone; Ipswich, Suffolk, IP9 1AZ; England; 52°00′10″N 1°11′43″E

Information
- Motto: Nisi Dominus vanum (Without the Lord, all is in vain)
- Established: 1951
- Founder: London County Council
- Closed: 1990
- Local authority: LCC and then ILEA
- Headmaster: J. S. H. Smitherman (1951), G. H. Bailey (1960) P. Richardson (1974), R. Woollett (1979)
- Gender: Boys
- Age: 11 to 18
- Houses: Berners, Corner's, Hall's, Hanson's, Johnston's, Orwell
- Colours: Navy blue and gold
- Publication: Janus

Woolverstone Hall School was a secondary grammar boarding school. In the early 1950s the London County Council obtained use of Woolverstone Hall near Ipswich, Suffolk, and some 50 acres (200,000 m^{2}) of adjoining land for the purpose of establishing a secondary grammar boarding school for London boys. The premises were previously occupied by the LNS Woolverstone, a branch of the London Nautical School, some students of which were permitted to complete their education in the new environment, which commenced experimentally in 1950. In September 1951, the new school formally opened with mostly new teaching staff under headmaster J. S. H. Smitherman. It became comprehensive in 1977, under the auspices of the Inner London Education Authority. The school closed in 1990 and the site was sold to the Girls' Day School Trust. In 1992 it became the home of Ipswich High School.

== Notable former students ==
- Peter Alexander (actor)
- Graham Barlow (cricketer)
- Tim Cresswell (geographer and poet)
- Charles De'Ath (actor)
- Cedric Delves (former commander of the SAS)
- Peter Donaldson (Radio 4 newsreader)
- Alan Gould (novelist and poet)
- George Hargreaves (politician)
- Phill Jupitus (comedian)
- Michael Kenward (science writer, Editor of New Scientist 1979–1990. Awarded OBE in 1990.)
- Ian McCulloch (actor and writer)
- Ian McEwan (novelist, Booker Prize winner)
- Tony Mitton (poet and children's writer)
- Mark Moore (musician)
- Martin Offiah (England and Great Britain rugby league international)
- Ben Onwukwe (actor)
- Justin Packshaw (Entrepreneur, philanthropist and adventurer)
- Neil Pearson (actor)
- Fay Presto (magician)
- Jean Roussel (musician)
- Ade Sapara (actor)
- Jonathan Sayeed (ex-Conservative MP)
- Guy Stevens (music executive)
- Mark Wing-Davey (actor and theatre director)
- Skibadee (musician)
- Ben Volpeliere-Pierrot ( musician)
