= 1991 Cheltenham Borough Council election =

Cheltenham Borough Council election

The 1991 Cheltenham Council election took place on 2 May 1991 to elect members of Cheltenham Borough Council in Gloucestershire, England. Due to local authority boundary changes a number of areas had been transferred from the Borough of Tewkesbury to the Borough of Cheltenham. Although most wards were unchanged, and continued to elect by thirds, three new wards were created, and had an all-up election: Leckhampton with Warden Hill, Prestbury and Swindon. Furthermore, the ward of Hatherley was abolished and recreated as Hatherley & The Reddings, and the number of councillors it elected was increased from three to four. This ward also had an all-out election.

Following the election, the Liberal Democrats took majority control of the council for the first time ever.

After the election, the composition of the council was:

- Liberal Democrat 25
- Conservative 8
- Labour 3
- People Against Bureaucracy 3
- Independent 2

== Election result ==
Cheltenham local election result 1991
Party	Seats	Gains	Losses	Net gain/loss	Seats %	Votes %	Votes	+/−
Liberal Democrats	14	6	0	+9	63.6	41.5	18,059	
PAB	3	0	0	+3	13.6	4.9	2,135	
Conservative	2	0	7	-7	9.1	33.6	14,615	
Independent	2	0	0	+2	9.1	9.6	4,189	
Labour	1	1	0	+1	4.5	10.4	4,539	

== Ward results ==
All Saints
Party	Candidate	Votes	%	±%
Liberal Democrats	Colin Hay	1,539	53.1	+2.5
Liberal Democrats	Sally Stringer	1,438	49.6	−1.0
Conservative	Daphne Pennell*	1,161	40.1	+9.1
Conservative	Mark Nutting	1,032	35.6	+4.6
Labour	Alan Powell	322	11.1	−7.3
Labour	Marianne Thornett-Roston	303	10.5	−7.9
Majority		277	9.5	
Turnout		2,897	43.97	
Liberal Democrats gain from Conservative		Swing		
Liberal Democrats hold		Swing		

Charlton Kings
Party	Candidate	Votes	%	±%
Liberal Democrats	Donald Goold	1,835	50.3	−2.7
Conservative	Jennifer Moreton*	1,633	44.7	+6.0
Labour	Mary Daniel	183	5.0	−3.3
Majority		202	5.6	
Turnout		3,651	58.16	
Liberal Democrats gain from Conservative		Swing		

College
Party	Candidate	Votes	%	±%
Liberal Democrats	Alan Stone	2,119	51.6	+0.3
Conservative	Brian Chaplin*	1,988	48.4	−0.3
Majority		131	3.2	
Turnout		4,107	60.34	
Liberal Democrats gain from Conservative		Swing		

Hatherley & The Reddings
Party	Candidate	Votes	%	±%
Liberal Democrats	David Fidgeon	1,736	45.9	
Liberal Democrats	Susan Townsend	1,702	45.0	
Liberal Democrats	Peter Lee	1,692	44.7	
Liberal Democrats	Mary Gray	1,688	44.6	
Conservative	Jacqueline Thorp*	1,654	43.7	
Conservative	Charles Raymond	1,480	39.1	
Conservative	Timothy Paterson	1,365	36.1	
Independent	Harry Turbyfield	936	24.7	
Independent	Roger Hicks	832	22.0	
Labour	Shirley Day	426	11.3	
Majority		34		
Turnout		3,783	50.42	
Liberal Democrats gain from Conservative		Swing		
Liberal Democrats hold		Swing		
Liberal Democrats hold		Swing		
Liberal Democrats win (new seat)				

Hesters Way
Party	Candidate	Votes	%	±%
Liberal Democrats	David Banyard*	2,042	68.9	+3.3
Conservative	Frances Wookey	526	17.8	+3.9
Labour	Duane McClusky	394	13.3	−7.2
Majority		1,516	51.1	
Turnout		2,962	40.18	
Liberal Democrats hold		Swing		

Lansdown
Party	Candidate	Votes	%	±%
Conservative	Aileen Bramah	1,291	55.0	+7.3
Liberal Democrats	Philip Hart	803	34.2	−1.8
Labour	Robert Irons	255	10.9	−5.4
Majority		488	20.8	
Turnout		2,349	40.37	
Conservative hold		Swing		

Leckhampton with Warden Hill
Party	Candidate	Votes	%	±%
Liberal Democrats	Hazel Langford	1,427	58.2	
Liberal Democrats	Adrian Morgan	1,131	46.1	
Independent	David Hall	1,050	42.8	
Conservative	Kenneth Buckland	950	38.7	
Conservative	Margaret Witcombe	846	34.5	
Conservative	Bryan Howell	744	30.3	
PAB	Harry Welsby	493	20.1	
Independent	Iain Willox	411	16.8	
Labour	Richard Courtney	308	12.6	
Majority		100	4.1	
Turnout		2,453	44.76	
Liberal Democrats win (new seat)				
Liberal Democrats win (new seat)				
Independent win (new seat)				

Park
Party	Candidate	Votes	%	±%
Conservative	Charles Irving*	1,739	55.1	+6.8
Liberal Democrats	John Howe	1,273	40.3	−5.0
Labour	Julian Dunkerton	143	4.5	−1.9
Majority		466	14.8	
Turnout		3,155	54.87	
Conservative hold		Swing		

Pittville
Party	Candidate	Votes	%	±%
Labour	Frank Bench	1,235	44.3	−9.8
Conservative	Anna Bullingham	871	31.2	+6.3
Liberal Democrats	Roger Jones	682	24.5	+3.5
Majority		364	13.1	
Turnout		2,788	46.04	
Labour gain from Conservative		Swing		

Prestbury
Party	Candidate	Votes	%	±%
PAB	Andrew Cornish	1,642	61.1	
PAB	Leslie Godwin	1,225	45.6	
PAB	John Newman	1,121	41.7	
Conservative	John Hamey	893	33.2	
Independent	Margarita Honneyman	852	31.7	
Conservative	Barbara Driver	761	28.3	
Liberal Democrats	Jennifer Jones	534	19.9	
Liberal Democrats	Robert Jones	518	19.3	
Liberal Democrats	David Lawrence	510	19.0	
Majority		228	8.5	
Turnout		2,686	45.25	
PAB win (new seat)				
PAB win (new seat)				
PAB win (new seat)				

St Mark's
Party	Candidate	Votes	%	±%
Liberal Democrats	Brian Cassin*	1,457	64.3	+2.8
Labour	Andre Curtis	424	18.7	−6.7
Conservative	Reginald Built-Leonard	384	17.0	+3.9
Majority		1,033	45.6	
Turnout		2,265	41.05	
Liberal Democrats hold		Swing		

St Paul's
Party	Candidate	Votes	%	±%
Liberal Democrats	Andrew McKinlay	1,273	57.8	+6.2
Conservative	Brian Gaylard	582	26.4	+0.5
Labour	Fiona Sewell	347	15.8	−6.7
Majority		691	31.4	
Turnout		2,202	38.42	
Liberal Democrats gain from Conservative		Swing		

St Peter's
Party	Candidate	Votes	%	±%
Liberal Democrats	Carol Hawkins	1,239	46.2	+2.9
Conservative	Roy Marchant*	943	35.1	+14.4
Labour	Ronald North	502	18.7	−17.4
Majority		296	11.1	
Turnout		2,684	47.06	
Liberal Democrats gain from Conservative		Swing		

Swindon
Party	Candidate	Votes	%	±%
Independent	Harry Tebbs	308	49.0	
Independent	Desmond May	221	35.1	
Liberal Democrats	Andrew Williams	100	13.9	
Majority		87	13.9	
Turnout		629	42.39	
Independent win (new seat)				
