= 1990 Cheltenham Borough Council election =

Cheltenham Borough Council election

The 1990 Cheltenham Council election took place on 3 May 1990 to elect members of Cheltenham Borough Council in Gloucestershire, England. One third of the council was up for election. The Social and Liberal Democrats became the biggest party, but fell one seat short of a majority, meaning the council stayed in no overall control.

After the election, the composition of the council was

- Social and Liberal Democrats 16
- Conservative 15
- Labour 2

== Election result ==
Cheltenham local election result 1990
Party	Seats	Gains	Losses	Net gain/loss	Seats %	Votes %	Votes	+/−
SLD	8	2	0	+2	72.7	48.5	16,063	+5.1
Conservative	2	0	1	-1	18.2	32.6	10,809	-10.0
Labour	1	0	0	-	9.1	18.9	6,251	+5.5
Residents	0	0	1	-1	0.0	0.0	0	±0.0

== Ward results ==
All Saints
Party	Candidate	Votes	%	±%
SLD	Adelaide Hodges*	1,473	50.6	+1.4
Conservative	Kenneth Burke	901	31.0	−7.6
Labour	Ian White	537	18.4	+6.1
Majority		572	19.6	
Turnout		2,911	43.66	
SLD hold		Swing		

Charlton Kings
Party	Candidate	Votes	%	±%
SLD	Barrie Anderson	1,936	53.0	+10.1
Conservative	Christopher Smith	1,412	38.7	−12.6
Labour	Mary Daniel	305	8.3	+2.6
Majority		524	14.3	
Turnout		3,653	57.84	
SLD gain from Residents		Swing		

College
Party	Candidate	Votes	%	±%
SLD	Garth Barnes	2,046	51.3	+8.5
Conservative	Bryan Howell*	1,943	48.7	−8.5
Majority		103	2.6	
Turnout		3,989	58.58	
SLD gain from Conservative		Swing		

Hatherley
Party	Candidate	Votes	%	±%
SLD	Eric Phillips*	1,725	51.4	+1.2
Conservative	Ada Nicholas	1,162	34.6	−5.4
Labour	Fiona Sewell	467	13.9	+4.1
Majority		563	16.8	
Turnout		3,354	50.53	
SLD hold		Swing		

Hesters Way
Party	Candidate	Votes	%	±%
SLD	Alistair Cameron*	2,061	65.6	+18.1
Labour	Shirley Day	644	20.5	+2.0
Conservative	Frances Wookey	436	13.9	−20.2
Majority		1,417	45.1	
Turnout		3,141	43.02	
SLD hold		Swing		

Lansdown
Party	Candidate	Votes	%	±%
Conservative	May Dent*	1,228	47.7	−9.3
SLD	Mary Gray	928	36.0	+5.6
Labour	Robert Irons	419	16.3	+4.6
Majority		300	11.7	
Turnout		2,575	43.07	
Conservative hold		Swing		

Park
Party	Candidate	Votes	%	±%
Conservative	Maureen Stafford*	1,560	48.3	−8.5
SLD	Alan Compton	1,466	45.3	+6.7
Labour	Martin Peters	207	6.4	+1.8
Majority		94	3.0	
Turnout		3,233	56.29	
Conservative hold		Swing		

Pittville
Party	Candidate	Votes	%	±%
Labour	Martin Hale*	1,593	54.1	+15.8
Conservative	Timothy Paterson	733	24.9	−6.8
SLD	Joseph Fallon	619	21.0	−2.1
Majority		860	29.2	
Turnout		2,945	48.68	
Labour hold		Swing		

St Mark’s
Party	Candidate	Votes	%	±%
SLD	Janet Watson*	1,550	61.5	+0.3
Labour	Andre Curtis	640	25.4	+8.1
Conservative	Mark Nutting	329	13.1	−8.3
Majority		910	36.1	
Turnout		2,519	44.97	
SLD hold		Swing		

St Paul’s
Party	Candidate	Votes	%	±%
SLD	Deborah Griggs*	1,119	51.6	−6.3
Conservative	Brian Gaylard	561	25.9	−2.7
Labour	Ronald North	489	22.5	+9.0
Majority		558	25.7	
Turnout		2,169	37.31	
SLD hold		Swing		

St Peter’s
Party	Candidate	Votes	%	±%
SLD	Pat Thornton*	1,140	43.3	+5.3
Labour	Julian Dunkerton	950	36.1	+10.2
Conservative	Nigel Ball	544	20.7	−15.4
Majority		190	7.2	
Turnout		2,634	45.49	
SLD hold		Swing		
