= Listed buildings in Woolverstone =

Civil Parish in Suffolk, England

Woolverstone is a village and civil parish in the Babergh District of Suffolk, England. It contains 18 listed buildings that are recorded in the National Heritage List for England. Of these one is grade I, two are grade II* and 15 are grade II.

This list is based on the information retrieved online from Historic England.

== Key ==
Grade	Criteria
I	Buildings that are of exceptional interest
II*	Particularly important buildings of more than special interest
II	Buildings that are of special interest

== Listing ==
Name	Grade	Location	Type	Completed (Note: The date given is the date used by Historic England as significant for the initial building or that of an important part in the structure's description.)	Date designated	Grid ref. (Note: The grid reference is based on the British national grid reference system, sometimes known as OSGB36, used by the Ordnance Survey.) Geo-coordinates	Notes	Entry number (Note: The "List Entry Number" is a unique number assigned to each listed building and scheduled monument by Historic England.)	Image	Wikidata
33 and 34, B1456	II	33 and 34, B1456			29 July 1987	TM1911437758; 51°59′42″N 1°11′25″E		1281395	Upload Photo	Q26570447
Berners Hall	II	B1456			16 May 2001	TM1830438545; 52°00′09″N 1°10′44″E		1246146	Upload Photo	Q26538584
Home Farmhouse	II	B1456			29 July 1987	TM1776238768; 52°00′17″N 1°10′16″E		1203960	Upload Photo	Q26499458
War Memorial in Front of Berners Hall	II	B1456	war memorial		16 May 2001	TM1829838557; 52°00′09″N 1°10′44″E		1246145	War Memorial in Front of Berners Hall More images	Q26538583
Woolverstone Hall Walled Garden and Associated Structures	II				13 September 2006	TM1884038542; 52°00′08″N 1°11′12″E		1391781	Upload Photo	Q26671132
Park View, Dairy House and Adjoining Dairy	II	Dairy House And Adjoining Dairy, Woolverstone Park			29 July 1987	TM1890938490; 52°00′06″N 1°11′16″E		1036942	Upload Photo	Q26288616
Widows' Homes	II	Main Road			29 July 1987	TM1851238532; 52°00′08″N 1°10′55″E		1036940	Upload Photo	Q26288614
Sunken Garden to Rear of Woolverstone House	II	Mannings Lane			29 July 1987	TM1828238740; 52°00′15″N 1°10′44″E		1036941	Upload Photo	Q26288615
Woolverstone House Including Walls Attached to Each Side	II*	Mannings Lane			16 March 1972	TM1828838758; 52°00′16″N 1°10′44″E		1204044	Upload Photo	Q17534079
Balustraded Retaining Wall with Gateways, Steps and Ha-has to Rear of Woolverstone Hall	II	Steps And Ha-has To Rear Of Woolverstone Hall, Woolverstone Park			29 July 1987	TM1957338662; 52°00′11″N 1°11′51″E		1036945	Upload Photo	Q26288619
Parterre Retaining Walls, Urns, Steps and Pool Basin with Statue of Diana to Rear of Woolverstone Hall	II	Urns, Steps And Pool Basin With Statue Of Diana To Rear Of Woolverstone Hall, Woolverstone Park			29 July 1987	TM1947538695; 52°00′12″N 1°11′46″E		1281381	Upload Photo	Q26570434
Cat House	II	Woolverstone Park			22 February 1955	TM1951538988; 52°00′21″N 1°11′49″E		1281385	Upload Photo	Q26570438
Church of St Michael	II*	Woolverstone Park	church building		22 February 1955	TM1902138583; 52°00′09″N 1°11′22″E		1204060	Church of St Michael More images	Q17534090
Holbrook Lodge	II	Woolverstone Park			16 March 1972	TM1880238281; 51°59′59″N 1°11′10″E		1204052	Upload Photo	Q26499541
Ice House	II	Woolverstone Park			29 July 1987	TM1964838272; 51°59′58″N 1°11′54″E		1036946	Upload Photo	Q26288620
Railings and Gate Piers Enclosing Courtyard to Front of Woolverstone Hall	II	Woolverstone Park			29 July 1987	TM1938738623; 52°00′10″N 1°11′41″E		1036944	Upload Photo	Q26288618
Stable Block to Woolverstone Hall	II	Woolverstone Park			22 February 1955	TM1936138465; 52°00′05″N 1°11′40″E		1036943	Upload Photo	Q26288617
Woolverstone Hall	I	Woolverstone Park	house		22 February 1955	TM1938838662; 52°00′11″N 1°11′41″E		1204081	Woolverstone Hall More images	Q8033966

== See also ==
- Grade I listed buildings in Suffolk
- Grade II* listed buildings in Suffolk

== Sources ==
- Bettely, James; Pevsner, Nikolaus (2015) [1961], Suffolk: West, The Buildings of England, New Haven and London: Yale University Press, ISBN 978-0-300-19655-9
