= Euan Sutherland =

Scottish businessman

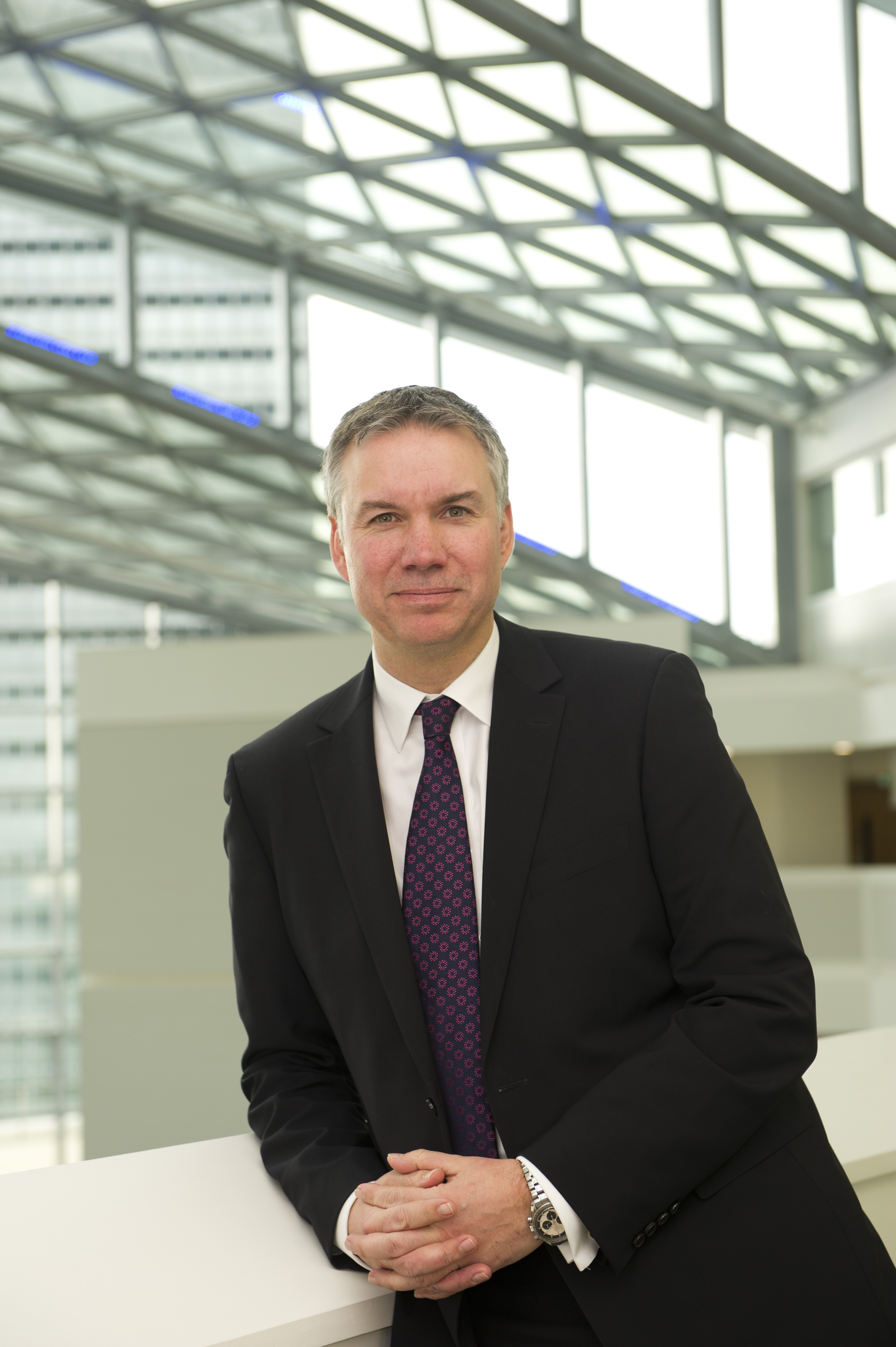
- Born: Euan Angus Sutherland; 9 February 1969 (age 57); Edinburgh, UK
- Occupation: Businessman
- Title: CEO, Saga plc
- Term: January 2020–November 2023

Euan Angus Sutherland (born 9 February 1969) is a Scottish businessman who was the chief executive of SuperGroup plc and Saga plc. He served as the chief executive of Saga from January 2020 to November 2023.

== Early life ==
Sutherland was born on 9 February 1969 in Edinburgh. He initially grew up in North Berwick and then in Glasgow, where he was educated at the High School of Glasgow. Sutherland studied accountancy at Edinburgh University, trained as an army officer, and then took a business studies course at Aston University.

== Career ==
After training in marketing with Coca-Cola, he worked in marketing and retail management positions with Mars Confectionery, Matalan, Currys and Superdrug. He then joined Kingfisher plc, rising to the position of chief operating officer.

=== Co-operative Group ===
Touted as a replacement for Kingfisher CEO Ian Cheshire, he joined the Co-operative Group in April 2013, taking over from Peter Marks as chief executive.

Due to inadequate capital levels in its banking group, Moody's downgraded the bank's credit rating by six notches to junk status (Ba3) and the bank's chief executive Barry Tootell resigned. The difficulties stemmed largely from the commercial loans of the Britannia Building Society, acquired in the 2009 merger.

Sutherland restructured, by intending to sell the life insurance business to Royal London releasing about £200m in capital, and planning to dispose of its other insurance business. On 5 June Richard Pennycook, former finance director of Morrisons, was named Co-operative Group's finance director, and Richard Pym, former chief executive of the Alliance & Leicester bank, as chair of the Co-operative Banking Group and the Co-operative Bank.

In March 2014, Sutherland resigned from The Co-operative because he said "I now feel that until the Group adopts professional and commercial governance it will be impossible to implement what my team and I believe are the necessary changes and reforms to renew the Group and give it a relevant and sustainable future". He was replaced by Richard Pennycook, then chief financial officer, who became the group's interim Chief Executive.

=== Supergroup ===
On 22 October 2014, it was announced that Sutherland had become CEO of SuperGroup plc.

On 2 April 2019, Sutherland resigned as CEO of SuperGroup plc after founder Julian Dunkerton won a bid to be reinstated to the SuperGroup plc board.

=== Saga ===
In December 2019, Saga appointed Sutherland as chief executive. At the time, the insurance business, which accounted for the overwhelming majority of the group's profits, needed to dramatically slash premiums to stay competitive.

In November 2023, Sutherland resigned from Saga with immediate effect.

== Personal life ==
Sutherland is married with three sons. His interests include rugby union and Formula One.
