= Justin Packshaw =

British entrepreneur (born 1965)

Justin Packshaw MBE DL FRGS
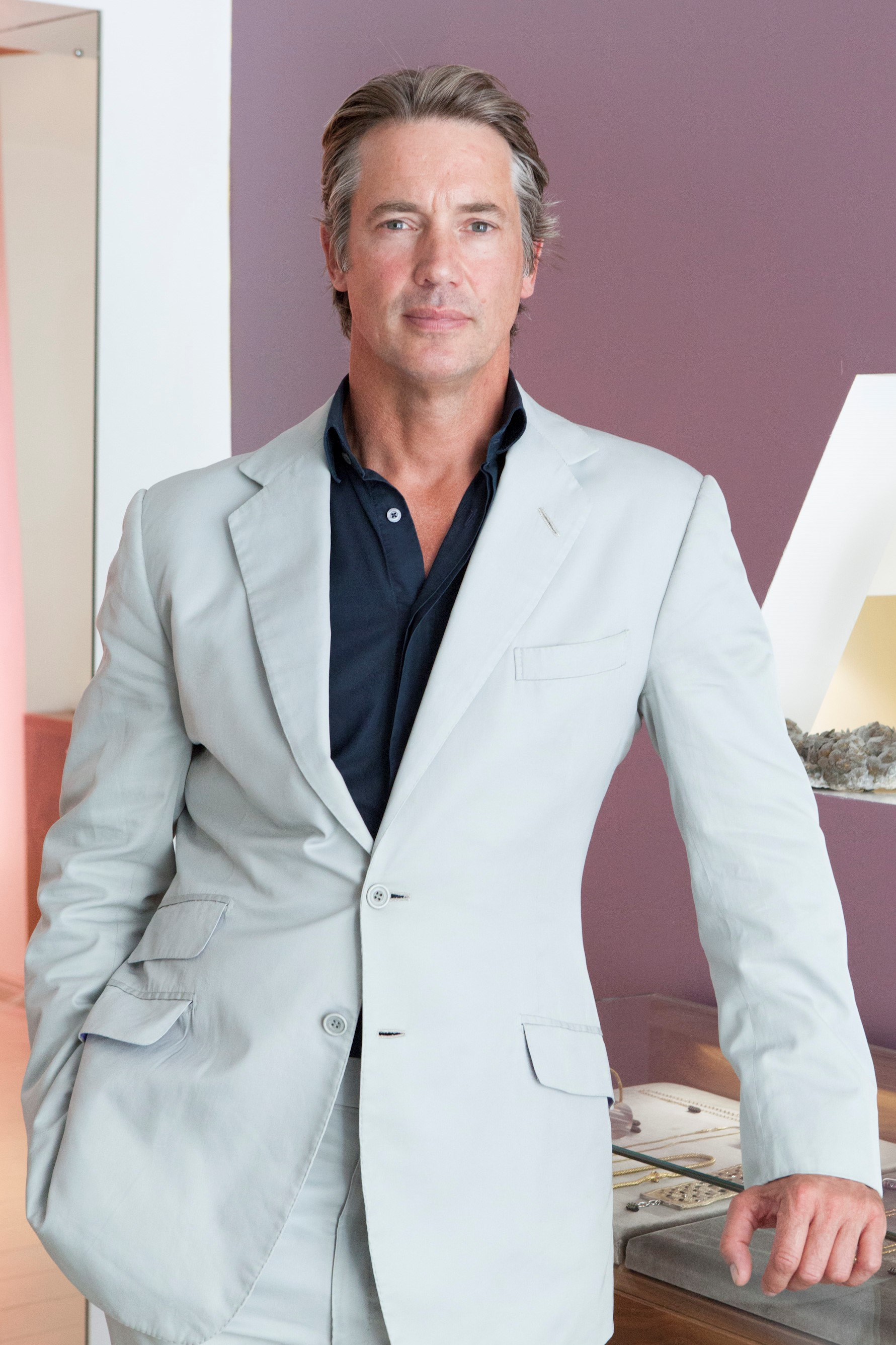
- Born: 13 March 1965 (age 61); London, United Kingdom
- Education: University of Edinburgh (MBA)
- Occupations: Entrepreneur; philanthropist; adventurer
- Spouse: Tamsin de Roemer
- Children: Lula & Blake
- Website: justinpackshaw.com

Justin James Packshaw MBE DL FRGS (born 13 March 1965) is an English entrepreneur, philanthropist and adventurer.

== Early life ==
Packshaw was born on 13 March 1965 in London. He was raised in Malta where he attended St Edward's College before returning to the United Kingdom in 1975 to finish his schooling at Sandroyd School and Woolverstone Hall. He completed a Master's in Business Administration at the University of Edinburgh in 1993.

== Business & Career ==
Packshaw served in the British Army for eight years, attending the Royal Military Academy Sandhurst in 1985 before being commissioned into the 4th/7th Royal Dragoon Guards where he served in BAOR, Cyprus, Brunei and the first Gulf War. He was Equerry to HRH The Duchess of Kent in 1992. He served as an Officer in the British Army Reserves after leaving the Regular Army from 1993 until 2014.

He is a director of De Roemer, a luxury jewellery brand he co-founded with his wife, Tamsin de Roemer, in 2008. He is also Partner & Chairman of travel company Joro Experiences. Packshaw also delivers talks worldwide to businesses, corporations and schools on topics around achievement, leadership, and adaptability, including a 2014 TEDx talk at the London School of Economics.

== Adventuring and expeditions ==
Packshaw participated in the 1989–1990 Whitbread Round the World Race, representing Great Britain. In 1996, he crossed Mongolia on horseback searching for the nomadic Dukha people, a small Tuvan (Tozhu Tuvans) Turkic community of reindeer herders. In 1999, he motorbiked across East Africa. In 2005, he won a 450-mile race to the North Pole and, in 2008, he helped guide 15-year-old Camilla Hempleman-Adams to ski the last degree to the Geographic North Pole. In 2011, he summited Mount Everest, helping to raise £130,000 for Walking with the Wounded, The Warrior Program, and Alzheimer's Research UK. In 2012, the centenary of Captain Robert Falcon Scott's Terra Nova Expedition, he led a team including three wounded veterans to the South Pole to raise money for Walking with the Wounded. In 2014, led an expedition across the coast of Nigeria from Cameroon to Benin via jet ski. That same year, Packshaw co-ordinated and led an expedition including two wounded veterans that followed the route of Sir Earnest Shackleton voyage of the James Caird from Antarctica to South Georgia to raise money for the Defence and National Rehabilitation Centre. In 2015, he led a team of businessmen to the North Pole, raising more than £400,000 for The Prince's Trust, and in 2017, he led a team to the South Pole that raised more than £685,000 for The Prince's Trust and the Roundhouse Trust.

In 2021 Packshaw led a 57-day research expedition of Antarctica. They started from Novolazarevskaya Station in Queen Maud Land and travelled through the interior 1,400 miles to the Geographic South Pole. With teammate Dr Jamie Facer-Childs the pair kite skied and man-hauled, unsupported across the ice. The team carried out research on climate change and also on human physiology and psychology working in collaboration with NASA, ESA and Stanford University.

== Charity ==
Packshaw is a UK Ambassador for The King's Trust. and The Duke of Edinghurgh Awards. In 2023 he became Vice-Patron of the Ulysees Trust, which provides funding, encouragement and advice to Armed Forces Reserves and Cadets throughout the UK. He is also a UK Trustee of the Big Life Foundation which is a conservation non-profit operating in East Africa.

== Honours and recognitions ==
During the 2016 New Year Honours, he was made a Member of the Order of the British Empire 'for services to expeditions, youth development, and charity'. In July 2016, he was commissioned a Deputy Lieutenant of Greater London, and was awarded the Freedom of the City of London in 2018. In 2021 Packshaw was given a Lifetime Achievement award at the British Ex-Forces in Business Awards. In 2010 he was made a Fellow of the Royal Geographical Society and he is an elected Fellow of the Explorers Club.
