= Ipswich High School, Suffolk =

Ipswich High School

Location
- Woolverstone; Ipswich, Suffolk, IP9 1AZ; England
- Coordinates: 52.00292°N 1.19532°E

Information
- Type: Private day and boarding school
- Motto: Before honour comes humility.
- Established: 1878
- Founder: Sophie Youngman
- Local authority: Suffolk
- Department for Education URN: 124888 Tables
- Head Teacher: Dan Browning
- Gender: Mixed
- Age: Nursery to 18
- Enrolment: 530
- Houses: Aqua, Ignis, Ventus, Terra
- Colours: Cherry red and dark grey
- Website: www.ipswichhighschool.co.uk

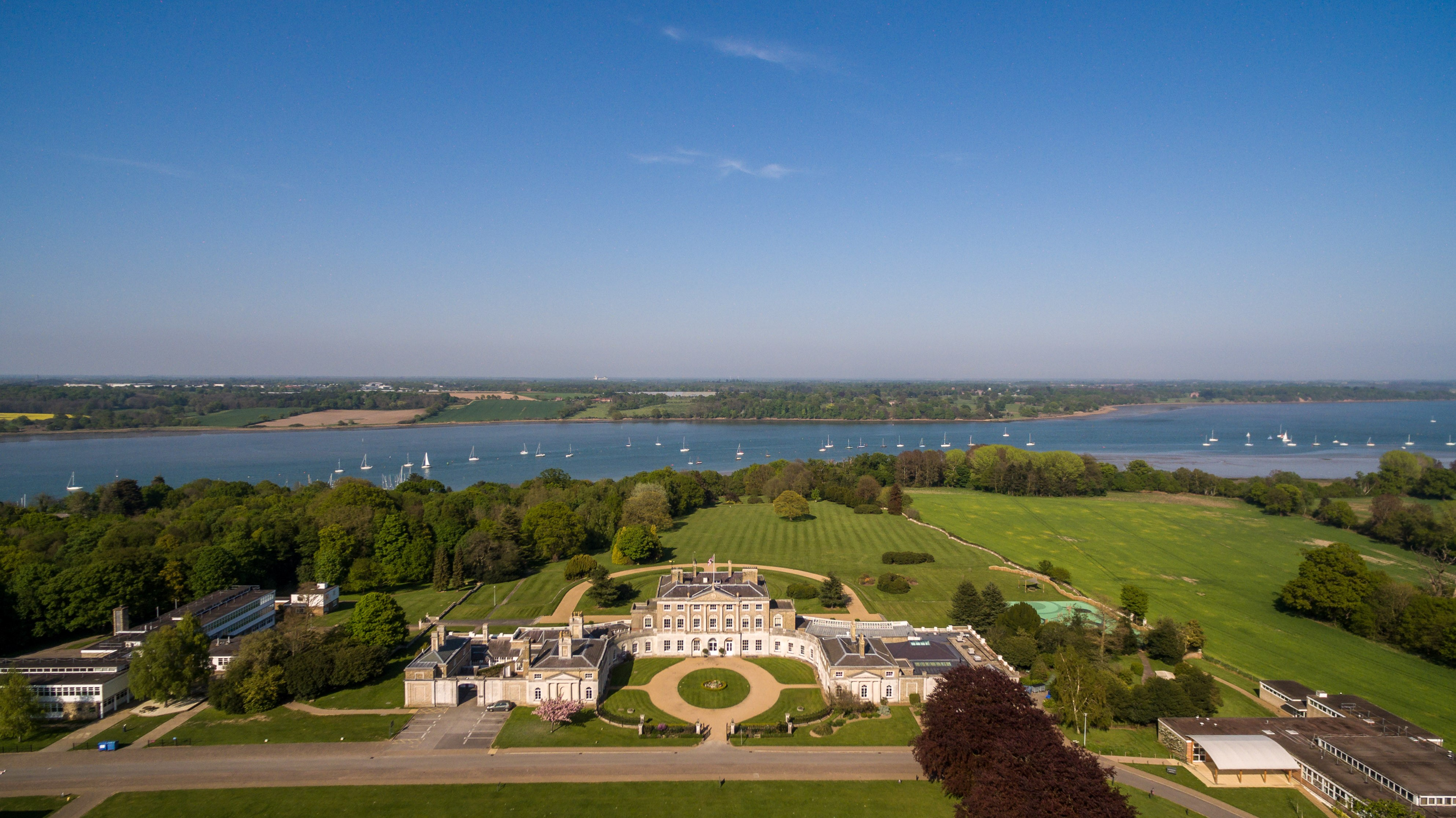
Ipswich High School, the main building Woolverstone Hall

Ipswich High School is an independent co-educational day and boarding school for pupils aged 3 to 18, based at Woolverstone Hall, near Ipswich, Suffolk, England. The school is set within 87 acres of parkland overlooking the River Orwell. Founded in 1878, the school was formerly part of the Girls' Day School Trust (GDST) and became fully co-educational in 2018. It is now owned by Ipswich Education Limited.

== History ==
Ipswich High School was opened as a school for girls in the Assembly Rooms in Northgate Street, Ipswich, on 30 April 1878 with 43 pupils. The first headmistress, Sophie Youngman, held the position for 21 years. She was succeeded by Miss Kennett. In 1905 the Council of the Trust purchased a large private house and grounds in Westerfield Road, Ipswich and the school moved there.

Another house, Woodview House, was purchased in 1913. Owing to the continued expansion of the school and the demands of the modern curriculum, the decision was taken in 1992 to rehouse the school at Woolverstone Hall, a Grade I listed building set in 80 acres (320,000 m^{2}) of parkland on the banks of the River Orwell, the former premises of Woolverstone Hall School for boys (1951 to 1990).

Transition to mixed-sex education took place in September 2018 after it separated from the Girls' Day School Trust. The change to co-education received mixed responses from parents and alumnae. As of 2020 the school serves a wide area of Suffolk and north Essex, taking girls and boys aged 3–18 years and providing both primary, secondary school and sixth form education, where pupils take A-Levels.

=== Governance ===
Following acquisition of the school by London and Oxford Group (LOG) in 2017, the principal and the chair of governors remained in their positions, reporting to the ownership subsidiary Ipswich Education Limited (IEL).

Dan Browning started as head in January 2023.

== Notable former pupils ==
- Ruth Ainsworth, writer
- June Brown, actress
- Enid Blyton, author
- Jade Holland Cooper, fashion designer
- Frances Hardinge, author
- Susan le Jeune d'Allegeershecque, diplomat
- Sandy Lister, hockey player
- Tracey MacLeod, journalist
- Helen Oxenbury, illustrator
- Kate Riley, television presenter and journalist
- Margaret Tempest, illustrator

== Notable staff ==
- Sandy Lister, hockey player
- Adnan Zakir, hockey player

== See also ==
- Independent Schools Council
