= Julian Dunkerton =

British businessman (born 1965)

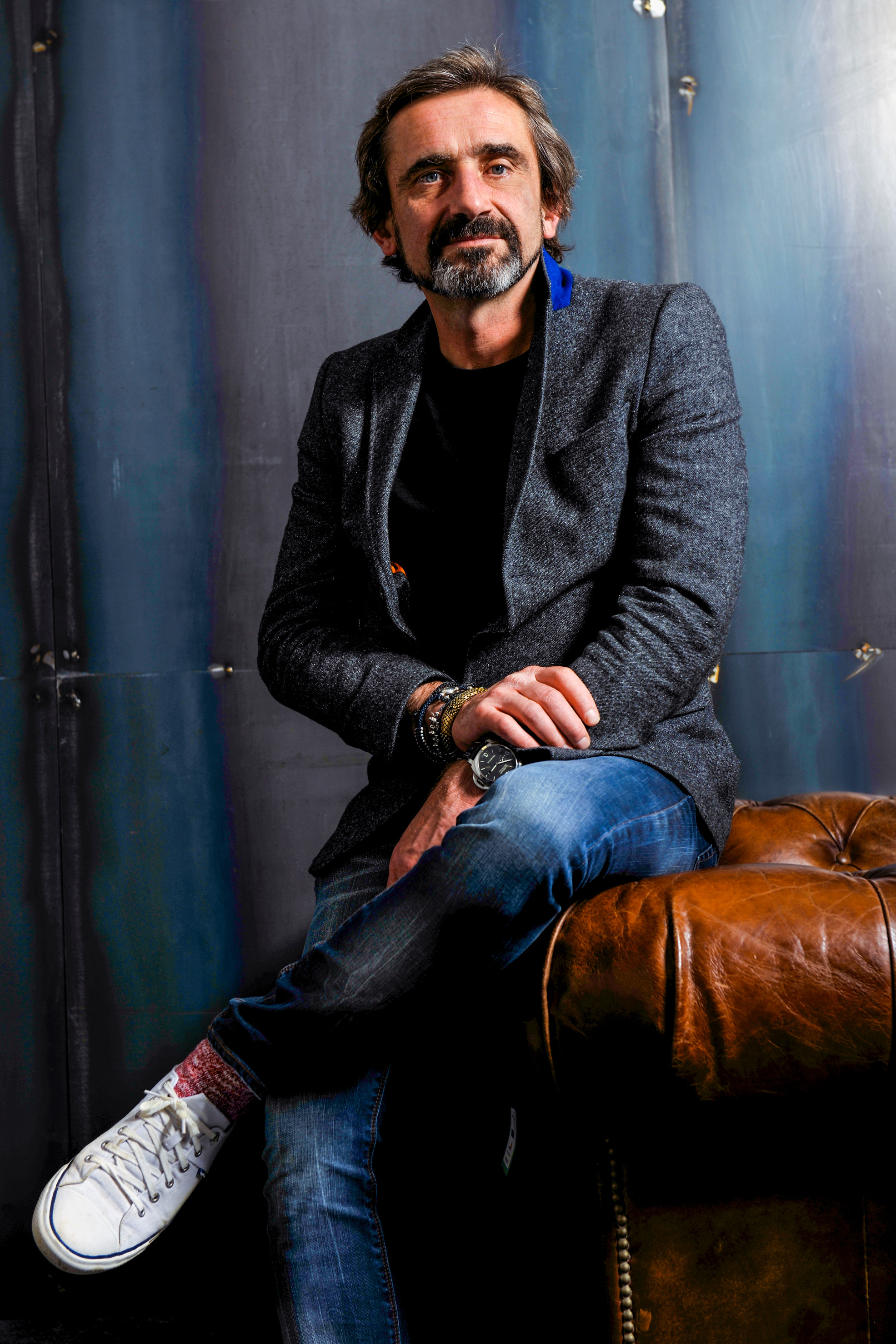
- Dunkerton in June 2014
- Born: 1 March 1965 (age 61); London, England
- Education: Ibstock Place School; Orleans Park School; Minster School
- Occupation: Businessman
- Known for: Co-founder of Superdry & Co
- Spouses: Charlotte Abbot (divorced); Jade Holland Cooper (m. 2018)
- Children: 4

Julian Marc Dunkerton (born 1 March 1965) is a British businessman, and the co-founder of the fashion label Superdry & Co.

== Early life ==
Dunkerton's father Ivor and stepmother Susie founded and ran Dunkertons Organic Cider. Dunkerton moved to Herefordshire from London at the age of 14.

He was educated at Ibstock Place School, Roehampton, Orleans Park School, Twickenham, from 11 to 14, and then the Minster School, Herefordshire.

== Career ==
At the age of 19, Dunkerton, along with his business partner Ian Hibbs, founded the fashion retail chain Cult Clothing Co with a £2,000 loan.

In 2014, Dunkerton took control of his family's cider company. In 2016, Dunkertons Organic Cider was moved from Herefordshire to a new cidery at Dowdeswell Park, near Cheltenham in Gloucestershire.

In 2015, Dunkerton stepped down as chief executive of Superdry and was replaced by Euan Sutherland. Dunkerton left Superdry in April 2018 to concentrate on his other business interests. He owns The Lucky Onion group, which operates a small group of hotels, restaurants and pubs in the Cotswolds. In 2019, Dunkerton won a bid to be reinstated to the SuperGroup plc board, and Sutherland resigned as CEO.

== Political activism ==
In the early 1990s, Dunkerton stood three times as a Labour Party candidate in the Cheltenham Borough Council elections. He stood in the St. Peter's ward in 1990, and in the Park ward in 1991 and 1992.

In August 2018, Dunkerton donated £1 million to People's Vote, a campaign group calling for a public vote on the final Brexit deal between the UK and the European Union. He believes that the success of the Superdry business could not have occurred if Britain had been outside the European Union at the time.

In the 2019 general election, he supported the Liberal Democrats, giving the party a £30,000 donation while also donating £100,000 to the Green Party of England and Wales and £35,000 to Plaid Cymru.

== Personal life ==
Dunkerton lives in Cheltenham. In February 2016, he sold just under £50 million of shares to fund his divorce settlement with his wife, Charlotte Abbot. They had two children, one stepdaughter and one daughter.

In 2016, Dunkerton began dating fashion designer Jade Holland Cooper after they met in the bar at one of his hotels in Cheltenham. They married in August 2018 in the Cotswolds where Craig David sang and Idris Elba deejayed. They have two children, a daughter born in 2020 and a son born in 2022.

He owns a private jet, which he describes as "a tool rather than an indulgence".
