= Bench (British clothing brand) =

British clothing brand

Bench Global Ltd.
- Type: Privately held company
- Industry: Fashion
- Founded: 1989; 37 years ago
- Founders: Nayef Marar; Barrie Suddons
- Headquarters: Manchester, England
- Area served: Worldwide
- Products: Apparel
- Owner: (50% owned by Emeram Capital GmbH, 50% independently owned)
- Website: bench.co.uk bench.ca

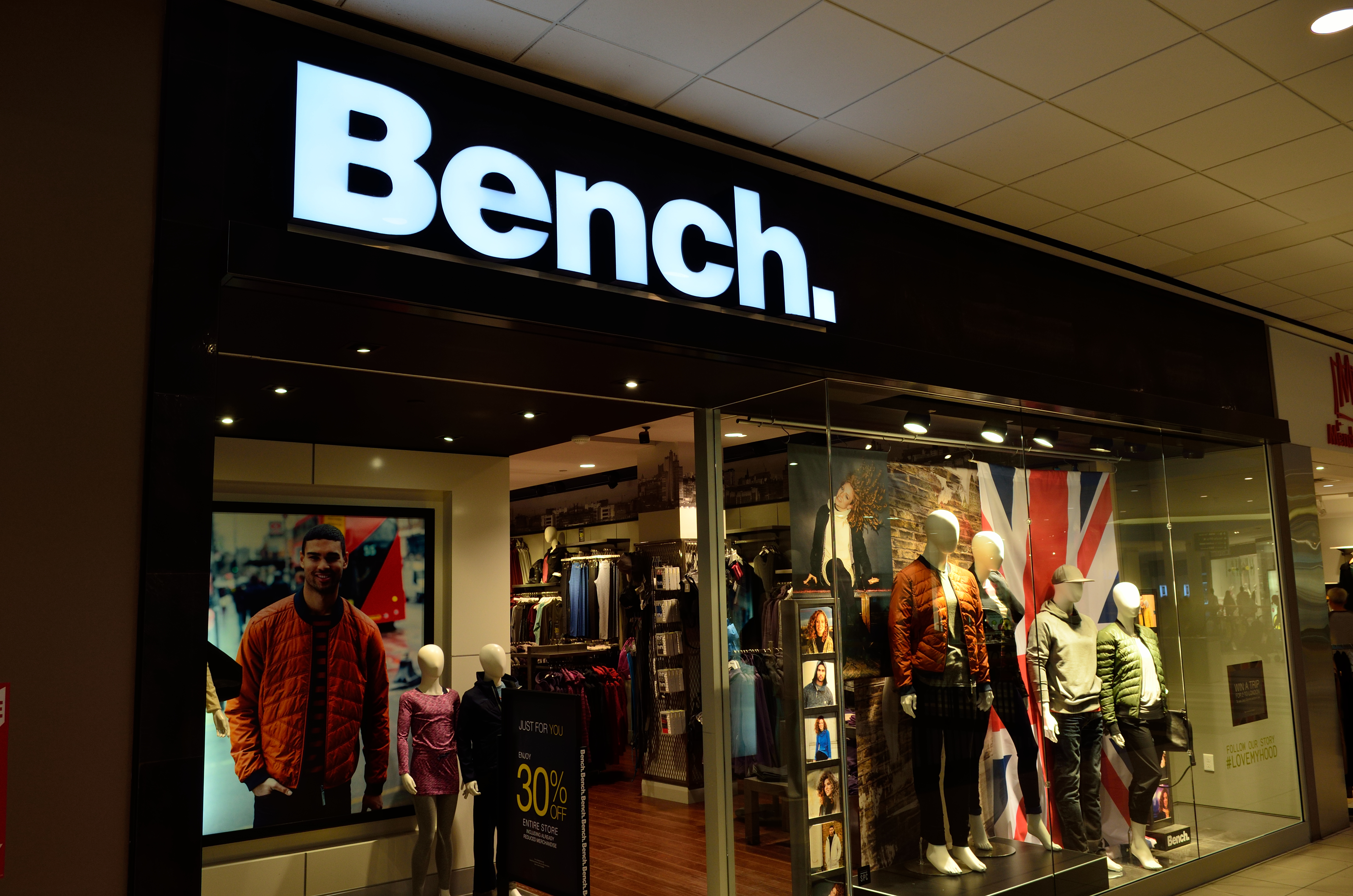
Bench store in the Promenade shopping centre, Vaughan, Ontario, Canada, 2015

Bench is a British clothing brand that is sold worldwide, including in Europe and Canada. The brand was owned by Bench Global Ltd., a company founded in Manchester, England, and specialises in streetwear.

== History ==
The brand began in 1989 creating graphic T-shirt designs influenced by skateboarding. The Manchester based fashion firm was founded by Nayef Marar and Barrie Suddons, and was acquired in 2004 by a management team led by finance director Alan Horridge for the company Americana for £20m. Over the years, Bench has evolved into a global lifestyle brand that now sells not only menswear but womenswear, including denim, trousers, sweats, hoodies, belts, bags, skirts and dresses.

The company appointed administrators in May 2018.

Gordon Brothers have secured the brand for continued development.

Apparel Brands Limited have secured the European license to relaunch the European Bench.

In January 2020, the company announced that all 24 of its stores in Canada would be closed and that it would "focus more on our e-commerce business as well as our key wholesale customers".
