= 2016 Cheltenham Borough Council election =

2016 UK local government election

← 2014	5 May 2016	2018 →

20 out of 40 seats to Cheltenham Borough Council 20 seats needed for a majority
	First party	Second party
Party	Liberal Democrats	Conservative
Seats before	25	11
Seats won	15	3
Seats after	29	7
Seat change	▲4	▼4
Popular vote	14,579	9,387
Percentage	45.5%	29.3%
	Third party
Party	PAB
Seats before	4
Seats won	1
Seats after	3
Seat change	▼1
Popular vote	2,188
Percentage	6.8%
- Map showing the results of the 2016 Cheltenham Borough Council elections by ward.
Council control before election
Liberal Democrat
Council control after election
Liberal Democrat

The 2016 Cheltenham Borough Council election was held on 5 May 2016 to elect members of Cheltenham Borough Council in England. This was on the same day as other local elections. The result was a victory for the incumbent Liberal Democrat administration, which increased its overall majority.

== Overall Results ==
Party	Previous council	New council	+/-
Liberal Democrats	25*	29	▲4
Conservatives	11	7	▼4
People Against Bureaucracy	4	3	▼1
Independent	0*	1	▲1
Total	40	40	

Cheltenham Borough Council Election Result 2016
Party	Seats	Gains	Losses	Net gain/loss	Seats %	Votes %	Votes	+/−
Liberal Democrats	15	4	0	+4	75.0	45.5	14,579	+3.0
Conservative	3	0	4	-4	15.0	29.3	9,387	-0.3
PAB	1	0	1	-1	5.0	6.8	2,188	+0.1
Labour	0	0	0	0	0	6.3	2,007	+1.4
Green	0	0	0	0	0	6.2	1,999	+2.7
Independent	1	1	0	+1	5.0	3.3	1,052	+1.4
UKIP	0	0	0	0	0	2.5	805	-7.5
TUSC	0	0	0	0	0	0.1	21	-0.3

== Ward results ==
=== All Saints ===
All Saints 2016
Party	Candidate	Votes	%	±%
Liberal Democrats	Stephen Andrew Jordan*	744	52.5	+11.2
Conservative	Martin Andrew Tracey	406	28.6	+0.1
Labour	Diana Helen Hale	164	11.6	+2.9
Green	Aina Catherine Wylie	103	7.3	−3.4
Majority		338	23.9	+11.1
Turnout		1,423	35	±0
Liberal Democrats hold		Swing		

=== Battledown ===
Battledown 2016
Party	Candidate	Votes	%	±%
Conservative	Louis Arthur Ives Savage*	850	55.6	+9.6
Liberal Democrats	Michael Robert Hart	444	29.0	−12.9
Labour	Helen Clare Pemberton	137	9.0	N/A
Green	Jon Paul Stubbings	98	6.4	N/A
Majority		406	26.6	+22.5
Turnout		1,536	37	−5
Conservative hold		Swing		

=== Benhall & The Reddings ===
Benhall & The Reddings 2016
Party	Candidate	Votes	%	±%
Liberal Democrats	Mike Collins	906	49.6	−17.1
Conservative	Jacky Fletcher*	764	41.8	+8.5
Green	Geoffrey Leslie Foster	86	4.7	N/A
Labour	Robin Frederick Carey	72	3.9	N/A
Majority		142	7.8	−25.6
Turnout		1,837	46	+1
Liberal Democrats gain from Conservative		Swing		

=== Charlton Kings ===
Charlton Kings 2016
Party	Candidate	Votes	%	±%
Liberal Democrats	Paul Gerard McCloskey	945	49.2	+3.9
Conservative	Jenny Elizabeth Kirkwood	721	37.6	+6.4
Green	Lorraine Elizabeth Mason	133	7.0	N/A
Labour	Lisa Michelle Belshaw	120	6.2	+0.4
Majority		224	11.6	+2.5
Turnout		1,925	45	−2
Liberal Democrats hold		Swing		

=== Charlton Park ===
Charlton Park 2016
Party	Candidate	Votes	%	±%
Liberal Democrats	Steve Harvey	1,010	51.4	+5.5
Conservative	Scott Robert Morris	788	40.1	−0.8
Labour	Malcolm Bride	106	5.4	+2.9
Green	Lennard Vincent Attard	61	3.1	+0.6
Majority		222	11.3	+6.3
Turnout		1,974	50	+3
Liberal Democrats gain from Conservative		Swing		

=== College ===
College 2016
Party	Candidate	Votes	%	±%
Liberal Democrats	Klara Victoria Sudbury*	1,063	63.0	+10.5
Conservative	Peter James Pritchard	370	21.9	−2.8
Green	Sarah Jane Field	101	6.0	−7.2
Labour	Joanna Susan Hughes	85	5.0	N/A
UKIP	Sue Jones	69	4.1	−5.5
Majority		693	41.1	+13.3
Turnout		1,689	40	−1
Liberal Democrats hold		Swing		

=== Hesters Way ===
Hesters Way 2016
Party	Candidate	Votes	%	±%
Liberal Democrats	Wendy Louise Flynn*	624	52.7	+1.1
Conservative	Shaun Stephen Bailey	371	31.4	+6.8
Labour	Rod Gay	107	9.0	−5.6
Green	Malcolm Albert John Allison	60	5.1	N/A
TUSC	Sam Coxson	21	1.8	−7.4
Majority		253	21.3	−5.7
Turnout		1,187	25	±0
Liberal Democrats hold		Swing		

=== Lansdown ===
Lansdown 2016
Party	Candidate	Votes	%	±%
Conservative	Diggory Charles Seacome*	646	52.9	+4.2
Liberal Democrats	Mike Newby	303	24.8	−16.2
Labour	Keith White	141	11.5	+1.2
Green	Sophie Dominique Franklin	131	10.7	N/A
Majority		343	28.1	+20.4
Turnout		1,230	30	−3
Conservative hold		Swing		

=== Leckhampton ===
Leckhampton 2016
Party	Candidate	Votes	%	±%
Independent	Ian Bickerton	821	40.1	+17.0
Conservative	Andrew William Chard*	583	28.5	−7.9
Liberal Democrats	Iain Andrew Paterson Dobie	409	20.0	−2.6
Green	Morgan Woodland	99	4.8	−3.4
UKIP	Ian Charles Anthony Statham	75	3.7	−6.0
Labour	Ian Hugh White	62	3.0	N/A
Majority		238	11.6	−1.7
Turnout		2,053	48	−5
Independent gain from Conservative		Swing		

=== Oakley ===
Oakley 2016
Party	Candidate	Votes	%	±%
Liberal Democrats	Rowena Mary Hay*	576	47.3	+1.8
Conservative	Emma Nelson	320	26.3	+12.7
Labour	Alec Gamble	235	19.3	+4.3
Green	Roberta Lee Smart	87	7.1	N/A
Majority		256	21.0	+1.4
Turnout		1,225	29	±0
Liberal Democrats hold		Swing		

=== Park ===
Park 2016
Party	Candidate	Votes	%	±%
Conservative	Tim Harman*	991	46.9	+4.4
Liberal Democrats	Dilys Mary Juliet Barrell	912	43.2	−1.7
Labour	Megan Alice England	109	5.2	+0.7
Green	Anne Knight-Elliott	101	4.8	−3.3
Majority		79	3.7	+1.3
Turnout		2,120	45	±0
Conservative hold		Swing		

=== Pittville ===
Dennis Parsons was expelled from the Liberal Democrats on 17 June 2020 for using a racist slur at a council meeting the day before. He now sits as an Independent.

Pittville 2016
Party	Candidate	Votes	%	±%
Liberal Democrats	Dennis Frank Parsons	838	46.0	+8.5
PAB	Peter Sayers	536	29.4	−11.6
Conservative	Barry Geoffrey Perks	273	15.0	−6.5
Labour	Sandra Easton-Lawrence	91	5.0	N/A
Green	Ian Antony Lander	84	4.6	N/A
Majority		302	16.6	+13.1
Turnout		1,826	41	−1
Liberal Democrats gain from PAB		Swing		

=== Prestbury ===
Prestbury 2016
Party	Candidate	Votes	%	±%
PAB	Malcolm George Stennett*	1,196	69.0	−7.4
Conservative	Alicia Wyer	258	14.9	−0.4
Liberal Democrats	Lisa Patricia Carr	202	11.6	+3.3
Green	Catherine Sarah Green	78	4.5	N/A
Majority		938	54.1	−7.0
Turnout		1,737	40	−5
PAB hold		Swing		

=== Springbank ===
Springbank 2016
Party	Candidate	Votes	%	±%
Liberal Democrats	Suzanne Theresa Williams*	778	57.0	+9.4
Conservative	Gavin Lee Garthwaite	285	20.8	+6.1
UKIP	Elizabeth Jane Roberts	217	15.9	−8.9
Green	Dale Karl Campbell	86	6.3	N/A
Majority		493	36.2	+13.9
Turnout		1,367	29	+1
Liberal Democrats hold		Swing		

=== St Mark’s ===
St Mark’s 2016
Party	Candidate	Votes	%	±%
Liberal Democrats	Christopher Francis Coleman*	896	62.9	+19.3
Conservative	Rosemary Rita Harvey	172	12.1	−3.4
UKIP	Peter Bowman	139	9.8	−14.2
Labour	Andre Ambrosius	124	8.7	+0.1
Green	Demelza Jade Jones	93	6.5	−1.8
Majority		724	50.8	+31.2
Turnout		1,433	31	−2
Liberal Democrats hold		Swing		

=== St Paul’s ===
St Paul’s 2016
Party	Candidate	Votes	%	±%
Liberal Democrats	Karl Nicholas Hobley	322	36.6	+6.4
Independent	Daud McDonald	231	26.3	+13.2
Labour	Clive Robert Harriss	141	16.0	+0.7
Conservative	Ben Stone	96	10.9	−5.0
Green	Jasmine Climpson Moreton	90	10.2	−1.6
Majority		91	13.3	−1.0
Turnout		888	21	±0
Liberal Democrats hold		Swing		

=== St Peter’s ===
St Peter’s 2016
Party	Candidate	Votes	%	±%
Liberal Democrats	David John Willingham	669	46.5	−0.6
Conservative	John Vincent Hopwood	376	26.1	+8.9
Green	Emily Catherine Campbell	263	18.3	N/A
Labour	Robert Ramuz Irons	131	9.1	−4.1
Majority		293	20.4	−4.2
Turnout		1,448	29	±0
Liberal Democrats hold		Swing		

=== Swindon Village ===
Swindon Village 2016
Party	Candidate	Votes	%	±%
Liberal Democrats	Bernie Fisher*	607	45.3	−21.0
PAB	Stuart James Deakin	456	34.0	N/A
Conservative	Janet Diana Honeywill	183	13.6	−20.1
Green	Adrian Becker	95	7.1	N/A
Majority		151	11.3	−21.3
Turnout		1,352	31	+1
Liberal Democrats hold		Swing		

=== Up Hatherley ===
Up Hatherley 2016
Party	Candidate	Votes	%	±%
Liberal Democrats	Roger Lee Whyborn*	1,163	64.5	+14.1
Conservative	Marcus Annfield	370	20.5	−8.1
UKIP	Peter William Joiner	138	7.7	−7.8
Labour	Christine Mary England	68	3.8	−1.7
Green	Adam Paul Van Coevorden	64	3.5	N/A
Majority		793	44.0	+22.2
Turnout		1,809	43	−4
Liberal Democrats hold		Swing		

=== Warden Hill ===
Warden Hill 2016
Party	Candidate	Votes	%	±%
Liberal Democrats	Tony Oliver	825	47.0	+11.6
Conservative	Neil Killian Jones	564	32.1	−7.2
UKIP	Ann Homer	167	9.5	−8.4
Labour	Joseph David Sucksmith	114	6.5	N/A
Green	Tim Bonsor	86	4.9	−2.4
Majority		261	14.9	+11.0
Turnout		1,762	41	−2
Liberal Democrats gain from Conservative		Swing		
