= 2021 Cheltenham Borough Council election =

2021 UK local government election

← 2018	6 May 2021	2022 →

20 out of 40 seats to Cheltenham Borough Council 21 seats needed for a majority
	First party	Second party
Party	Liberal Democrats	Conservative
Seats before	32	6
Seats won	14	5
Seats after	31	7
Seat change	▼1	▲1
Popular vote	16,241	14,312
Percentage	42.6%	37.5%
	Third party
Party	PAB
Seats before	2
Seats won	1
Seats after	2
Seat change	Steady
Popular vote	1,307
Percentage	3.4%
- Map showing the results of the 2021 Cheltenham Borough Council elections by ward. Yellow shows the Liberal Democrats, blue shows the Conservatives and black People Against Bureaucracy.
Council control before election
Liberal Democrat
Council control after election
Liberal Democrat

The 2021 Cheltenham Borough Council elections took place on 6 May 2021 to elect members of Cheltenham Borough Council in Gloucestershire, England. Half of the council was up for election, and the Liberal Democrats remained in overall control of the council.

These seats were due to be contested in 2020, but were delayed by one year due to the COVID-19 pandemic.

== Results summary ==
2021 Cheltenham Borough Council election
Party	This election			Full council			This election		
Party	Seats	Net	Seats %	Other	Total	Total %	Votes	Votes %	+/−
Liberal Democrats	14	▼1	75.0	16	31	75.0	16,241	42.6	-2.9
Conservative	5	▲1	20.0	3	7	20.0	14,312	37.5	+8.2
PAB	1	▼1	5.0	1	2	5.0	1,307	3.4	-3.4
Green	0	Steady	0.0	0	0	0.0	4,178	11.0	+4.8
Labour	0	Steady	0.0	0	0	0.0	2,068	5.4	-0.9
TUSC	0	Steady	0.0	0	0	0.0	26	0.1	±0.0

== Council composition ==
Before the election, the composition of the council was:

↓
32	6	2
Liberal Democrats	Conservative	PAB

After the election, the composition of the council was:

↓
31	7	2
Liberal Democrats	Conservative	PAB

PAB - People Against Bureaucracy

== Ward results ==
Incumbent councillors are denoted by an asterisk (*)

=== All Saints ===
All Saints
Party	Candidate	Votes	%	±%
Liberal Democrats	Barbara Ann Clark	798	46.8	−0.3
Conservative	Susan Mary Godwin	508	29.8	−6.7
Green	Jessica West	271	15.9	+9.2
Labour	Isobel Amy Laing	129	7.6	−2.1
Majority		290	17.0	
Turnout		1,706	40	+6
Liberal Democrats hold		Swing		

=== Battledown ===
Battledown
Party	Candidate	Votes	%	±%
Conservative	Louis Arthur Ives Savage*	1,005	46.3	−11.9
Liberal Democrats	Helen Clare Pemberton	850	39.1	+9.0
Green	Daniel Joseph Willey	185	8.5	+3.3
Labour	Caroline Adele Gavin	132	6.1	−0.4
Majority		155	7.2	
Turnout		2,172	46	+8
Conservative hold		Swing		

=== Benhall & The Reddings ===
Benhall & The Reddings
Party	Candidate	Votes	%	±%
Liberal Democrats	Mike Collins*	1,048	51.6	−3.7
Conservative	Jonathan Edward Beeston	768	37.8	−2.0
Green	Sarah Jane Field	153	7.5	N/A
Labour	Robin Frederick Carey	62	3.1	−1.8
Majority		280	13.8	
Turnout		2,031	51	+4
Liberal Democrats hold		Swing		

=== Charlton Kings ===
Charlton Kings
Party	Candidate	Votes	%	±%
Liberal Democrats	Paul Gerard McCloskey*	1,016	46.4	−1.4
Conservative	Jake Wilson	852	38.9	−0.1
Green	Lorraine Elizabeth Mason	229	10.5	+5.2
Labour	Elle Harriet Rees	91	4.2	−3.6
Majority		164	7.5	
Turnout		2,188	50	+6
Liberal Democrats hold		Swing		

=== Charlton Park ===
Charlton Park
Party	Candidate	Votes	%	±%
Liberal Democrats	Steve Harvey*	1,092	46.8	−2.4
Conservative	Phil Davis	1,003	43.0	−2.1
Green	Sharon Lorna Wallington	162	6.9	+3.7
Labour	Sarah Jane Chacko	75	3.2	+0.7
Majority		89	3.8	
Turnout		2,332	58	+5
Liberal Democrats hold		Swing		

=== College ===
College
Party	Candidate	Votes	%	±%
Liberal Democrats	William Guy Rosewarne Maughfling	1,027	51.0	−6.7
Conservative	Rich Newman	563	27.9	+1.4
Green	Elizabeth Johnson	307	15.2	+9.0
Labour	Robert George Arnott	118	5.9	−2.7
Majority		464	23.1	
Turnout		2,015	46	+8
Liberal Democrats hold		Swing		

=== Hesters Way ===
Hesters Way
Party	Candidate	Votes	%	±%
Liberal Democrats	Wendy Louise Flynn*	619	45.4	−9.7
Conservative	Laura Elizabeth Haley	515	37.8	+6.1
Green	Adrian Becker	118	8.7	N/A
Labour	John Malcolm Bride	105	7.7	−5.5
TUSC	Samuel Jacob Coxson	7	0.5	N/A
Majority		104	7.6	
Turnout		1,364	28	+4
Liberal Democrats hold		Swing		

=== Lansdown ===
Lansdown
Party	Candidate	Votes	%	±%
Conservative	Diggory Charles Seacome*	795	45.1	−7.8
Liberal Democrats	Paul Wheat	627	35.6	+5.8
Green	Stephen Paul Bell	239	13.6	+7.2
Labour	Duncan James Siret	100	5.7	−5.2
Majority		168	9.5	
Turnout		1,761	42	+9
Conservative hold		Swing		

=== Leckhampton ===
Leckhampton
Party	Candidate	Votes	%	±%
Conservative	Margaret Emma Frances Nelson	1,132	43.9	−2.7
Liberal Democrats	Glenn Andrews	853	33.1	−3.3
Green	Peter Robert Frings	592	23.0	+9.8
Majority		279	10.8	
Turnout		2,577	59	+7
Conservative hold		Swing		

=== Oakley ===
Oakley
Party	Candidate	Votes	%	±%
Liberal Democrats	Rowena Mary Hay*	597	48.1	−6.1
Conservative	Jake Michael Andrew Hardy	414	33.4	+10.0
Labour	Mike Jarvis	122	9.8	−13.6
Green	Stephen West	107	8.6	N/A
Majority		183	14.7	
Turnout		1,240	29	−4
Liberal Democrats hold		Swing		

=== Park ===
Park
Party	Candidate	Votes	%	±%
Conservative	Tim Harman*	1,292	49.6	+4.2
Liberal Democrats	Izaac Augustus Tailford	983	37.7	−9.9
Green	Catherine Sunita Lyon Leggett	217	8.3	+5.1
Labour	Kevin Michael Boyle	112	4.3	+0.5
Majority		309	11.9	
Turnout		2,604	53	+3
Conservative hold		Swing		

=== Pittville ===
Pittville
Party	Candidate	Votes	%	±%
Conservative	Stephan Alexander Fifield	1,038	48.3	+16.8
Liberal Democrats	Jason Edwin Potter-Peachey	713	33.2	+1.5
Green	Billy Wassell	231	10.8	+7.5
Labour	Julie Frances Farmer	166	7.7	+0.1
Majority		325	15.1	
Turnout		2,148	44	+3
Conservative gain from Liberal Democrats		Swing		

=== Prestbury ===
Prestbury
Party	Candidate	Votes	%	±%
PAB	Ian Michael Bassett-Smith	1,128	50.0	−15.7
Conservative	Alan James Davis	683	30.3	+16.4
Liberal Democrats	Graham Anthony Beale	445	19.7	−0.7
Majority		455	19.7	
Turnout		2,256	46	+2
PAB hold		Swing		

=== Springbank ===
Springbank
Party	Candidate	Votes	%	±%
Liberal Democrats	Suzanne Theresa Williams*	746	52.9	−11.4
Conservative	Paul Robert Simons	427	30.3	+4.9
Labour	Thomas Alister Johnson	132	9.4	−1.0
Green	Stephen John Bear	104	7.4	N/A
Majority		319	22.6	
Turnout		1,409	28	+3
Liberal Democrats hold		Swing		

=== St. Mark's ===
St. Mark's
Party	Candidate	Votes	%	±%
Liberal Democrats	Richard James Pineger	736	48.0	−4.8
Conservative	Jerome Eugene Forrest	467	30.4	+2.6
Green	David John Clarke	179	11.7	+4.7
Labour	Mike Farmer	152	9.9	−2.5
Majority		269	17.6	
Turnout		1,534	32	+6
Liberal Democrats hold		Swing		

=== St. Paul's ===
St. Paul's
Party	Candidate	Votes	%	±%
Liberal Democrats	Alisha Chloe-Marie Lewis	431	33.5	−5.3
Green	Tabi Joy	294	22.9	N/A
Conservative	Roger Graham Fox	227	17.7	+5.8
PAB	Daud McDonald	179	13.9	−9.6
Labour	Kenneth Syme	136	10.6	−15.1
TUSC	Joe Waters	19	1.5	N/A
Majority		137	10.6	
Turnout		1,286	29	+3
Liberal Democrats hold		Swing		

=== St. Peter's ===
St. Peter's
Party	Candidate	Votes	%	±%
Liberal Democrats	David John Willingham*	953	52.5	+12.6
Conservative	Edward Wahid Hazzan	493	27.2	−5.6
Green	Karen Wilson	215	11.9	−6.1
Labour	Clive Robert Harriss	153	8.4	−1.0
Majority		460	26	
Turnout		1,814	33	+4
Liberal Democrats hold		Swing		

=== Swindon Village ===
Swindon Village
Party	Candidate	Votes	%	±%
Liberal Democrats	Bernie Fisher*	740	48.3	−13.8
Conservative	Susan Jean McArdle	452	29.5	−8.4
Green	Edward Nuan Bycroft Saul	212	13.8	N/A
Labour	Peter Arthur Robert Clark	128	8.4	N/A
Majority		288	18.8	
Turnout		1,532	35	+8
Liberal Democrats hold		Swing		

=== Up Hatherley ===
Up Hatherley
Party	Candidate	Votes	%	±%
Liberal Democrats	Julie Margaret Sankey	979	47.3	−9.6
Conservative	Rhiannon Evans	810	39.2	+3.0
Green	Samantha Diane Hodges	199	9.6	N/A
Labour	Neil Andrew Armitage	80	3.9	−3.1
Majority		169	8.1	
Turnout		2,068	50	+7
Liberal Democrats hold		Swing		

=== Warden Hill ===
Warden Hill
Party	Candidate	Votes	%	±%
Liberal Democrats	Tony Oliver*	988	47.2	+0.8
Conservative	Ro Baillie	868	41.4	−3.1
Green	Timothy Cosmo Bonsor	164	7.8	+3.0
Labour	Ian Hugh White	75	3.6	−0.6
Majority		120	5.8	
Turnout		2,095	48	+3
Liberal Democrats hold		Swing		
