= Max Wilkinson =

British politician (born 1984)

Max Wilkinson MP
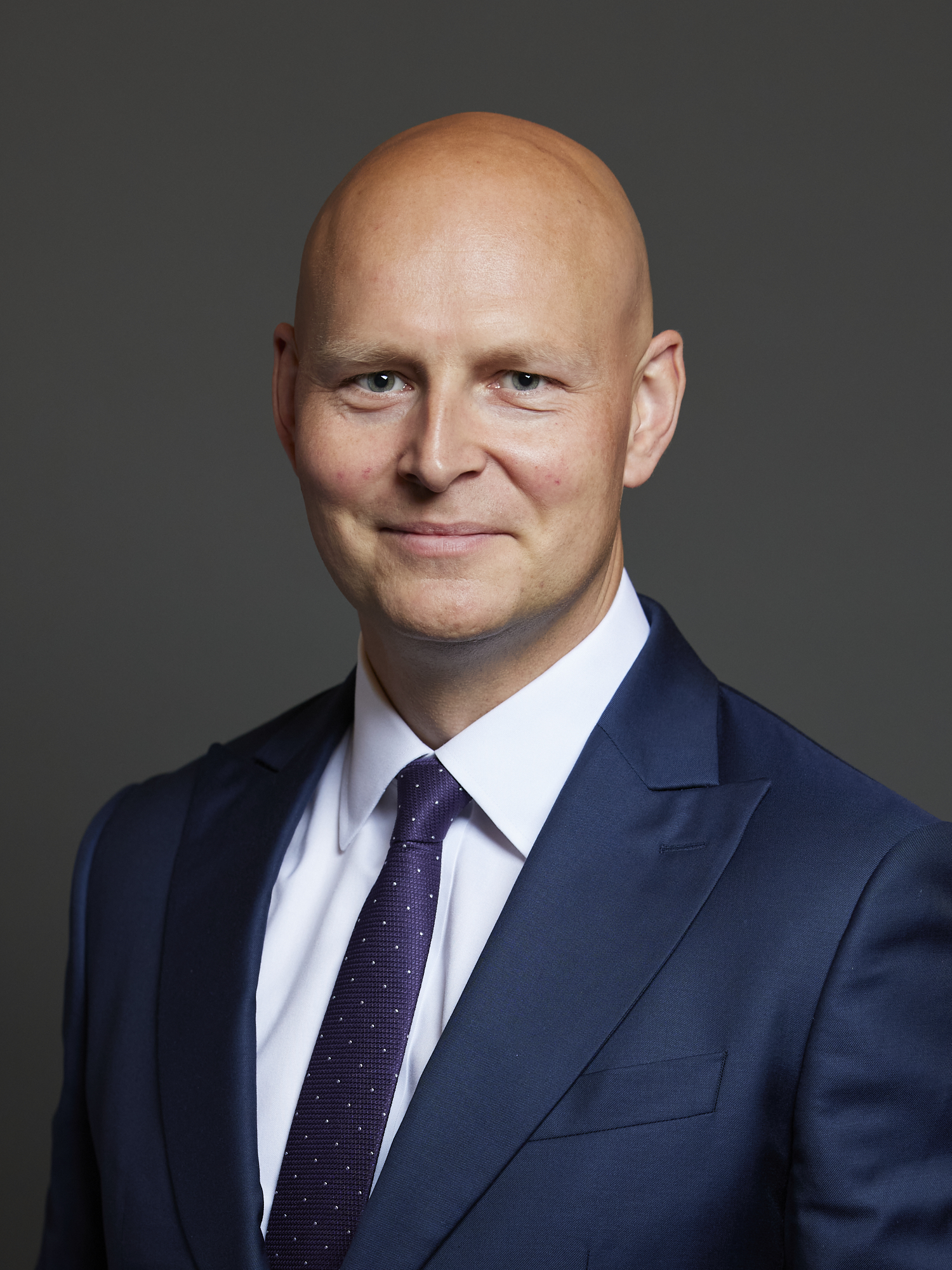
- Official portrait, 2024

Member of Parliament for Cheltenham
- Incumbent
- Assumed office 4 July 2024
- Preceded by: Alex Chalk
- Majority: 7,210 (14.6%)

Liberal Democrat portfolios
- 2024–2025: Culture, Media and Sport
- 2025–present: Home Affairs

Personal details
- Born: Maximilian Peter McGregor Wilkinson; 16 March 1984 (age 42)
- Party: Liberal Democrats
- Education: Broadoak Community School; Churchill Community School; Cardiff University

Maximilian Peter McGregor Wilkinson (born 16 March 1984) is a British Liberal Democrat politician who has been Member of Parliament (MP) for Cheltenham since 2024.

== Early life and career ==
Wilkinson attended Broadoak Community School (now Broadoak Academy) and took A-levels at Churchill Community School (now Churchill Academy and Sixth Form) before studying business management and administration at Cardiff University (2003-2007).

After graduating in 2007 he worked as a journalist. His first permanent job after university was at The Weston Mercury. He later worked as a reporter for Cheltenham newspaper, The Gloucestershire Echo. During his time as a journalist, Wilkinson worked as a freelance sports reporter, covering football matches in the West. Wilkinson then worked in communications for Cheltenham Ladies College (2012-2014), and in Cheltenham for PR and communications agency Camargue (2014-2021).Remove citation to LinkedIn per WP:RSP; claim remains supported by adjacent citation

== Political career before Parliament ==
Wilkinson was first elected to Cheltenham Borough Council to serve Park ward in 2014, deposing the then Conservative group leader in what was then the Conservative Party’s safest ward in Cheltenham.

He subsequently became the councillor for Oakley ward in 2018, and was reelected in 2022.

In 2020 he was appointed as Cheltenham's first Council Cabinet Member for the Climate Emergency.

Wilkinson stood down as a councillor in May 2024.

== Parliamentary career ==
=== Election history ===
Wilkinson was the Liberal Democrat general election candidate in Stroud at the snap 2017 general election, where he came in third place with 2,053 votes (3.2%). Later that year, he was selected to contest the Cheltenham seat. In the 2019 general election he came second with 27,505 votes (46.3%), 981 votes behind the incumbent Conservative MP Alex Chalk.

Wilkinson was elected MP for Cheltenham in the 2024 general election on 4 July, with 25,076 votes (50.6%) and a majority of 7,210 over Alex Chalk, then Conservative Justice Secretary and incumbent MP. There were five candidates and a turnout of 65%. Chalk had held the seat since 2015, taking it from the Liberal Democrats.

In his maiden speech, Wilkinson spoke of the rich culture of Cheltenham, highlighting its numerous festivals, including literature, horse racing, poetry, music, jazz, food, cricket, and science, emphasizing its identity as "the festival town." He spoke about the need to improve local health services. He stated that his first priority would always be his constituency.

=== Cyber security ===
Wilkinson is a supporter of Cheltenham’s cyber security and tech community. He has asked numerous questions in Parliament about the town’s cyber security sector, referencing the local cyber cluster, CyNam, including lobbying successfully for £20million funding for Cheltenham’s council-led Golden Valley development.

He is vice-chair of the All Party Parliamentary Group on Cyber Innovation.

=== Health ===
Among Wilkinson’s earliest achievements as MP was the development of a cross-party consensus among Gloucestershire’s MPs on the need to fully reopen the birth unit at Cheltenham General Hospital, which had been temporarily closed almost two years prior to his election. His campaign for a new GP surgery to accommodate the town’s growth began before his election. He has also campaigned to protect and improve local A&E services. Cheltenham General Hospital’s A&E was downgraded to an overnight minor injuries unit in 2013 and Wilkinson’s campaign for election in 2024 questioned the Conservative MP’s claims of success on local hospital campaigns.

=== Spokesperson role ===
As the Lib Dem Culture Media and Sport spokesperson, Wilkinson campaigned for the rights of artists and creatives. He spoke out against the threat posed to creatives by AI, most notably in the context of proposed changes to copyright laws. He campaigns for the rights of touring artists in light of the challenges they have faced since Brexit.

He is known for bringing lighthearted asides and gentle humour to his spokesperson’s role, often deploying song title puns during questions.

Wilkinson revealed in a speech to the Commons that despite being the Lib Dem sports spokesperson, he did not achieve grade C at GCSE PE after a poor rounders assessment. He also claims to have scored a goal from the halfway line during a University football match.

=== The Sunshine Bill ===
In Parliament, Wilkinson presented the New Homes (Solar Generation) Bill as his Private Members Bill. The bill, branded the Sunshine Bill, would see solar panels installed on all newbuild homes. It gained widespread support and received a positive response from the government at second reading. While the Bill did not pass for a third reading, the government pledged to work with Wilkinson to introduce the change.

=== Reform UK misinformation ===
In April and May 2025, Wilkinson was the victim of a misinformation campaign by Reform UK. A Reform party social media account manipulated footage taken in the House of Commons to give the appearance Wilkinson had called Nigel Farage a ‘stupid cunt’. After Wilkinson raised a Point of Order in the House of Commons, Reform deleted the post and issued an apology to him and the House of Commons.

Parliament of the United Kingdom
Preceded by Alex Chalk	Member of Parliament for Cheltenham; 2024–present	Incumbent
