= Cheltenham Municipal Offices =

Municipal building in Cheltenham, Gloucestershire, England

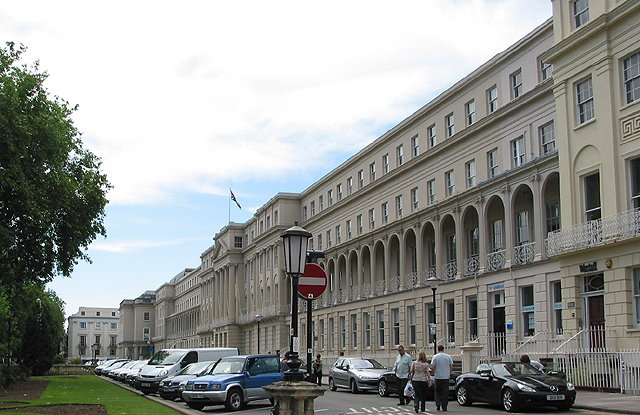
- Cheltenham Municipal Offices

- Shown in Gloucestershire
- 51.8992°N 2.0779°W
- Location: Cheltenham

History
- Built: 1840

Site notes
- Architect: George Allen Underwood
- Architectural style: Classical style

Listed Building – Grade II*
- Official name: Numbers 47 to 83 and Attached Railings with Low Walls and End Piers to Numbers 71 and 73
- Designated: 12 March 1955
- Reference no.: 1387631

The Cheltenham Municipal Offices are a municipal facility on The Promenade, Cheltenham, England. The offices, which are the headquarters of Cheltenham Borough Council, are a Grade II* listed building.

== History ==
The construction of this row of terraced houses on the west side of the Promenade, (Note: The Promenade was originally laid out in 1818 as a track leading to the natural springs flowing from the Sherborne Spa which eventually ran out of water and closed in 1947.) which was developed by Samuel Harward, began in 1823. The development was designed by George Allen Underwood in the Classical style and was originally known as "Harward's Buildings" when the buildings were completed in 1840. The design involved a symmetrical main frontage with 63 bays facing onto the Promenade; the central section of three bays, which slightly projected forward, featured a window flanked by two doorways on the ground floor; there were three tall sash windows on the first floor and three smaller sash windows on the second floor with huge Ionic order columns spanning the first and second floors supporting a pediment. David Verey described the row of buildings as "equal to any terrace in Europe".

By the mid-19th century most of the buildings were used by professional or business establishments. The photographer, Hugo van Wadenoyen, occupied No. 79 The Promenade in the early 20th century.

A lawn known as the Long Garden was established between the buildings and the Promenade. A statue of a soldier with arms reversed commemorating local service personnel who died in the Second Boer War was unveiled by General Sir Ian Hamilton at the northern end of the Long Garden on 17 July 1907. Meanwhile, a statue of the locally-born polar explorer, Edward Wilson, by Captain Robert Scott's widow, Kathleen Scott, was unveiled by the explorer Sir Clements Markham at the southern end of the Long Garden on 9 July 1914. The central seven houses were acquired by Cheltenham Borough Council, for use as its headquarters, in 1916. A war memorial commemorating local service personnel who had died in the First World War was unveiled by Major-General Sir Robert Fanshawe in the middle of the Long Garden, in front of the central section of the building, on 1 October 1921. After the Second World War additional names of people who had died in the service of their country were added to the memorial. A programme of works to restore the memorial, including cleaning of the stonework, repointing and the restoration of the names, was completed in 2016.

Works of art in the Municipal Offices include a portrait by Sir Oswald Birley of General Lord Ismay, who was chief of staff to Winston Churchill during the Second World War and who had lived at Wormington Grange near Stanton, Gloucestershire.

In 2025, Cheltenham Borough Council announced that it had entered negotiations with a preferred potential buyer of the terrace, the proposal being to be redevelop the buildings as a luxury hotel and spa.
