= 2026 Cheltenham Borough Council election =

2026 English local government election

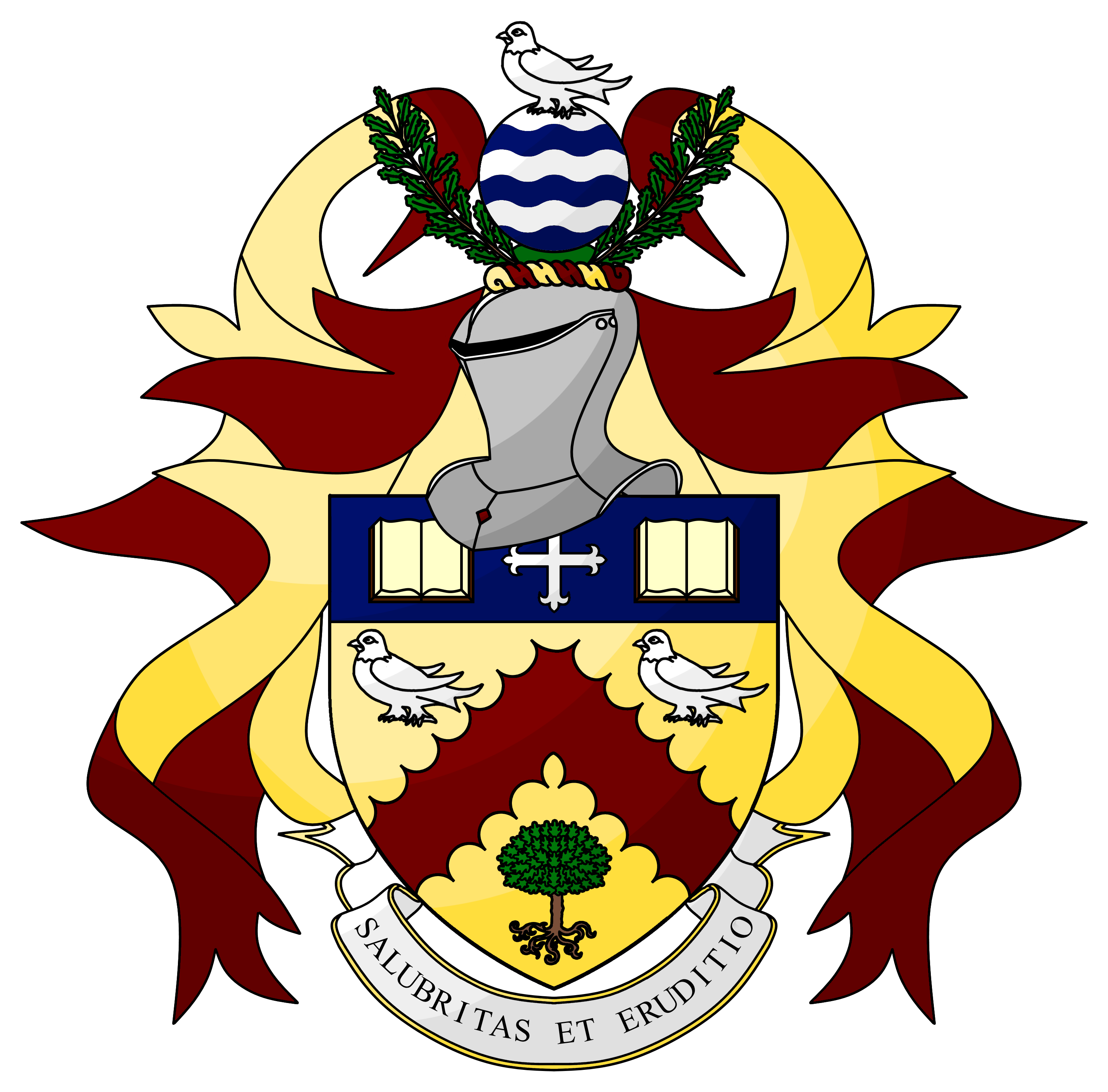
- 7 May 2026

20 out of 40 seats to Cheltenham Borough Council 21 seats needed for a majority
- Registered: 92,128
- Turnout: 40,520; 44.0%
	First party	Second party	Third party
Leader	Rowena Hay	Ashleigh Davies	None
Party	Liberal Democrats	Green	Reform
Last election	36 seats, 51.9%	3 seats, 15.7%	Did not contest
Seats before	36	3	0
Seats won	17	2	1
Seats after	35	3	1
Seat change	▼1	Steady	▲1
Popular vote	17,093	7,752	7,820
Percentage	42.3%	19.2%	19.4%
Swing	▼9.6%	▲3.5%	▲19.4%
- Results by ward
Leader before election
Rowena Hay
Liberal Democrats
Leader after election
Rowena Hay
Liberal Democrats

The 2026 Cheltenham Borough Council election was held on 7 May 2026, alongside the other local elections across the United Kingdom held on the same day, to elect 20 of 40 members of Cheltenham Borough Council in Gloucestershire, England.

The Liberal Democrats retained their majority on the council at this election.

== Summary ==
=== Background ===
In 2024, the Liberal Democrats retained majority control of the council. In January 2026, the council asked for the election to be postponed pending local government reorganisation. This was against the wishes of the national Leader of the Liberal Democrats, Ed Davey. However it was rescheduled on 16 February 2026.

Retiring councillors

Ward	Departing Councillor	Party
Charlton Kings	Hannah Healy	Liberal Democrats
Lansdown	Ben Orme	Liberal Democrats
Park	Dilys Barrell	Liberal Democrats
Pittville	Juan Clamp	Liberal Democrats
St Peter's	David Willingham	Liberal Democrats
Swindon Village	Frank Allen	Liberal Democrats

=== Election result ===
The Liberal Democrats retained control of Cheltenham Borough Council, winning 17 of the 20 seats contested. The Green Party won two seats, while Reform UK won one seat. The election had a turnout of 44%.

2026 Cheltenham Borough Council election
Party	This election				Full council			This election		
Party	Candidates	Seats	Net	Seats %	Other	Total	Total %	Votes	Votes %	+/−
Liberal Democrats	{{{candidates}}}	17	▼1	85.0	18	35	87.5	17,093	42.3	–9.6
Green	{{{candidates}}}	2	Steady	10.0	1	3	7.5	7,752	19.2	+3.5
Reform	{{{candidates}}}	1	▲1	5.0	0	1	2.5	7,820	19.4	N/A
PAB	{{{candidates}}}	0	Steady	0.0	1	1	2.5	N/A (Note: Did not stand candidates.)	N/A	–1.5
Conservative	{{{candidates}}}	0	Steady	0.0	0	0	0.0	7,091	17.5	–7.9
Labour	{{{candidates}}}	0	Steady	0.0	0	0	0.0	616	1.5	–3.2
CPA	{{{candidates}}}	0	Steady	0.0	0	0	0.0	22	0.1	N/A
TUSC	{{{candidates}}}	0	Steady	0.0	0	0	0.0	14	0.0	–0.2
Heritage	{{{candidates}}}	0	Steady	0.0	0	0	0.0	10	0.0	N/A

Reform UK won its first seat on Cheltenham Borough Council, with Callum James Eldridge winning Hesters Way by 16 votes from Liberal Democrat candidate Benjamin Botchway.

== Ward results ==
Sitting councillors are marked with an asterisk (*).

=== All Saints ===
All Saints
Party	Candidate	Votes	%	±%
Liberal Democrats	Izaac Tailford*	928	45.0	−8.7
Green	James Dyson	596	28.9	+14.3
Reform	Hod Birkby	275	13.3	N/A
Conservative	Gill Hewlett	225	10.9	−12.2
Labour	Diana Hale	37	1.8	−12.2
Majority		332	16.1	N/A
Turnout		2,066	45.69	+11.7
Registered electors		4,521		
Liberal Democrats hold		Swing		

=== Battledown ===
Battledown
Party	Candidate	Votes	%	±%
Liberal Democrats	Chris Day*	1,040	47.4	+2.2
Conservative	Chris Clinton	506	23.1	−17.2
Reform	Marcia Jacko	349	15.9	N/A
Green	Liam Pem	276	12.6	+1.6
Labour	Lukshayini Manimaran	23	1.0	−6.3
Majority		534	24.3	N/A
Turnout		2,196	46.1	+10.1
Registered electors		4,759		
Liberal Democrats hold		Swing		

=== Benhall, the Reddings and Fiddler's Green ===
Benhall, the Reddings and Fiddler's Green
Party	Candidate	Votes	%	±%
Liberal Democrats	Stephen Steinhardt*	1,103	46.6	−4.1
Reform	Maggie Humphries	565	23.9	N/A
Conservative	Dan Collins	436	18.4	−14.0
Green	Emily Fairburn	264	11.1	−1.4
Majority		538	22.7	N/A
Turnout		2,372	47.69	+6.7
Registered electors		4,974		
Liberal Democrats hold		Swing		

=== Charlton Kings ===
Charlton Kings
Party	Candidate	Votes	%	±%
Liberal Democrats	Arthur Snell	922	39.4	−5.9
Green	Jon Perera	563	24.1	+11.0
Conservative	Matt Babbage	487	20.8	−8.4
Reform	Den Jeffreys-Jones	320	13.7	N/A
Labour	Ella Rees	47	2.0	−7.1
Majority		359	15.3	N/A
Turnout		2,339	51.86	+9.9
Registered electors		4,516		
Liberal Democrats hold		Swing		

=== Charlton Park ===
Charlton Park
Party	Candidate	Votes	%	±%
Liberal Democrats	Steve Harvey*	906	38.5	−14.5
Conservative	Elliot Craddock	740	31.4	+4.4
Green	Kes Steger	370	15.7	+8.0
Reform	Kevin Bowden	296	12.6	N/A
Labour Co-op	John Bride	44	1.9	−3.7
Majority		166	7.0	N/A
Turnout		2,360	54.82	+8.9
Registered electors		4,305		
Liberal Democrats hold		Swing		

=== College ===
College
Party	Candidate	Votes	%	±%
Liberal Democrats	Garth Barnes*	1,003	50.0	+1.9
Green	Naomi Seadon	337	16.8	−6.9
Conservative	Rich Newman	334	16.7	−1.7
Reform	Maureen McNall	269	13.4	N/A
Labour	Adam Moliver	51	2.5	−8.1
Heritage	Stephen Reid	10	0.5	N/A
Majority		666	33.2	N/A
Turnout		2,007	47.35	+6.35
Registered electors		4,239		
Liberal Democrats hold		Swing		

=== Hesters Way ===
Hesters Way
Party	Candidate	Votes	%	±%
Reform	Callum Eldridge	431	31.7	N/A
Liberal Democrats	Benjamin Botchway	415	30.5	−5.9
Green	Wendy Flynn	366	26.9	−2.4
Conservative	Alex Miller	99	7.3	−8.1
Labour	Clive Harriss	40	2.9	−12.7
TUSC	Samuel Coxson	8	0.6	−2.2
Majority		16	1.2	N/A
Turnout		1,361	27.05	+8.05
Registered electors		5,032		
Reform gain from Liberal Democrats		Swing		

The result gave Reform UK its first seat on Cheltenham Borough Council, defeating the Liberal Democrats by 16 votes.

=== Lansdown ===
Lansdown
Party	Candidate	Votes	%	±%
Liberal Democrats	Jamie Jamieson	874	41.6	+4.4
Conservative	Pippa Mason	574	27.3	–5.7
Green	Ed Joy	330	15.7	+2.7
Reform	Dean Raymond Luke Botterill	324	15.4	N/A
Majority		300	14.3	N/A
Turnout		2,107	43.62	+10.62
Registered electors		4,830		
Liberal Democrats hold		Swing		

=== Leckhampton ===
Leckhampton
Party	Candidate	Votes	%	±%
Liberal Democrats	Julia Caroline Chandler*	1,274	53.9	+6.6
Conservative	Nick Saywell	491	20.8	–9.9
Reform	Stephen Hayward Bajdala-Brown	307	13.0	N/A
Green	Peter Frings	260	11.0	±0.0
Labour	Philip Cole	33	1.4	–4.5
Majority		783	33.1	N/A
Turnout		2,374	55.31	+5.31
Registered electors		4,292		
Liberal Democrats hold		Swing		

=== Oakley ===
Oakley
Party	Candidate	Votes	%	±%
Liberal Democrats	Alisha Chloe-Marie Lewis*	632	43.1	–3.7
Reform	Maureen Susan Dodwell	487	33.2	N/A
Green	Nathan Weller	204	13.9	+5.9
Conservative	Roy Hewlett	144	9.8	–12.7
Majority		145	9.9	N/A
Turnout		1,467	33.55	+9.55
Registered electors		4,373		
Liberal Democrats hold		Swing		

=== Park ===
Park
Party	Candidate	Votes	%	±%
Liberal Democrats	Karen Louise Priest	997	41.9	–4.9
Conservative	Tim Harman	750	31.5	–7.1
Reform	Andrew Patrick Dempsey	298	12.5	N/A
Green	Karen Wilson	290	12.2	+2.4
Labour	Kevin Michael Boyle	45	1.9	–6.1
Majority		247	10.4	N/A
Turnout		2,385	52.87	+8.87
Registered electors		4,511		
Liberal Democrats hold		Swing		

=== Pittville ===
Pittville
Party	Candidate	Votes	%	±%
Liberal Democrats	Cecily Frances Grace Henderson	1,037	45.0	+0.5
Green	Jamal Rahman	470	20.4	+6.6
Reform	Ashley John Fraser Mills	389	16.9	N/A
Conservative	Alan James Davis	362	15.7	–10.2
Labour	Martin William Glozier	45	2.0	–6.9
Majority		567	24.6	N/A
Turnout		2,313	48.10	+12.10
Registered electors		4,809		
Liberal Democrats hold		Swing		

=== Prestbury ===
Prestbury
Party	Candidate	Votes	%	±%
Green	Jan Foster*	993	41.2	+3.6
Reform	Lance Alan Fletcher	621	25.8	N/A
Conservative	Chris Mason	430	17.9	–13.4
Liberal Democrats	Benjamin David Ingram	364	15.1	+2.6
Majority		372	15.4	N/A
Turnout		2,417	50.35	+9.35
Registered electors		4,800		
Green hold		Swing		

=== Springbank ===
Springbank
Party	Candidate	Votes	%	±%
Liberal Democrats	Peter Jeffries*	719	45.1	–19.7
Reform	Haydn Pearl	498	31.2	N/A
Green	Sarp Cetin	195	12.2	+1.8
Conservative	Helen Shill	162	10.2	–9.0
CPA	David Edgar	22	1.4	N/A
Majority		221	13.8	N/A
Turnout		1,598	32.80	+8.80
Registered electors		4,872		
Liberal Democrats hold		Swing		

=== St Mark's ===
St Mark's
Party	Candidate	Votes	%	±%
Liberal Democrats	Richard James Pineger*	752	43.9	–7.8
Reform	Antony Neil Fillingham	438	25.6	N/A
Green	Kieran Scott	297	17.3	+4.5
Conservative	Colin John Parsons	160	9.3	–10.6
Labour	Julie Frances Farmer	67	3.9	–12.6
Majority		314	18.3	N/A
Turnout		1,720	36.68	+8.68
Registered electors		4,689		
Liberal Democrats hold		Swing		

=== St Paul's ===
St Paul's
Party	Candidate	Votes	%	±%
Green	Ashleigh Davies*	723	50.5	+11.0
Liberal Democrats	Cathal Lynch*	374	26.1	–1.5
Reform	Steve Buckley	208	14.5	N/A
Conservative	Sandra Gloria Parsons	87	6.1	–4.7
Labour	Christopher John Meehan	40	2.8	–17.0
Majority		349	24.4	N/A
Turnout		1,440	31.77	+6.77
Registered electors		4,533		
Green hold		Swing		

Cathal Lynch was a sitting councillor for Hesters Way ward

=== St Peter's ===
St Peter's
Party	Candidate	Votes	%	±%
Liberal Democrats	Cathy Dearden	876	44.4	–8.6
Green	John Jarvis	444	22.5	+7.1
Reform	Anthony William Green	386	19.6	N/A
Conservative	Risha Santilal	187	9.5	−6.6
Labour	Michael Thomas Farmer	72	3.7	–12.2
TUSC	Billy Jones	6	0.3	N/A
Majority		432	21.9	N/A
Turnout		1,983	39.97	+11.97
Registered electors		4,961		
Liberal Democrats hold		Swing		

=== Swindon Village ===
Swindon Village
Party	Candidate	Votes	%	±%
Liberal Democrats	Richard Lawler	606	37.8	–12.8
Reform	Matthew David William Podmore	462	28.8	N/A
Green	Ian Cameron	363	22.7	–2.3
Conservative	Edward Wadih Hazzan	126	7.9	–7.9
Labour	Chris Johnson	45	2.8	N/A
Majority		144	9.0	N/A
Turnout		1,605	41.66	+9.66
Registered electors		3,853		
Liberal Democrats hold		Swing		

=== Up Hatherley ===
Up Hatherley
Party	Candidate	Votes	%	±%
Liberal Democrats	Julie Margaret Sankey*	1,177	51.2	–0.7
Reform	Tristram John Francis Torrance	456	19.8	N/A
Conservative	Joshua James Godfrey	431	18.8	–6.5
Green	Elizabeth Johnson	234	10.2	–1.3
Majority		721	31.4	N/A
Turnout		2,302	46.60	+7.60
Registered electors		4,940		
Liberal Democrats hold		Swing		

=== Warden Hill ===
Warden Hill
Party	Candidate	Votes	%	±%
Liberal Democrats	Tony Oliver*	1,094	52.2	–0.4
Reform	David Paul Dodwell	441	21.0	N/A
Conservative	Georgie Bass	360	17.2	–11.8
Green	Sarah Quekett	177	8.4	+0.6
Labour	Ned Holt	27	1.3	–4.7
Majority		653	31.1	N/A
Turnout		2,105	48.74	+7.74
Registered electors		4,319		
Liberal Democrats hold		Swing		
