= 2014 Cheltenham Borough Council election =

2014 UK local government election

Results of the 2014 Cheltenham Borough Council election

The 2014 Cheltenham Borough Council election took place on 22 May 2014 to elect members of Cheltenham Borough Council in England. This was on the same day as other local elections.

== Election result ==
Cheltenham Borough Council Election Result 2014
| Party | Seats | Gains | Losses | Net gain/loss | Seats % | Votes % | Votes | +/− |
|---|---|---|---|---|---|---|---|---|
| Liberal Democrats | 14 | 2 | 2 | 0 | 70.0 | 42.5 | 14,153 | -0.5 |
| Conservative | 4 | 2 | 2 | 0 | 20.0 | 29.6 | 9,857 | -6.8 |
| UKIP | 0 | 0 | 0 | 0 | 0 | 10.0 | 3,327 | +6.5 |
| PAB | 2 | 0 | 0 | 0 | 10.0 | 6.7 | 2,249 | -0.4 |
| Labour | 0 | 0 | 0 | 0 | 0 | 4.9 | 1,639 | +0.3 |
| Green | 0 | 0 | 0 | 0 | 0 | 3.5 | 1,172 | -1.9 |
| Independent | 0 | 0 | 0 | 0 | 0 | 1.9 | 646 | N/A |
| TUSC | 0 | 0 | 0 | 0 | 0 | 0.4 | 143 | N/A |
| NHA | 0 | 0 | 0 | 0 | 0 | 0.4 | 135 | N/A |

== Ward results ==
=== All Saints ===
All Saints
| Party | Candidate | Votes | % | ±% |
|---|---|---|---|---|
| Liberal Democrats | Dan Murch | 587 | 41.3 | −1.4 |
| Conservative | Steve Thomas | 406 | 28.5 | −9.9 |
| UKIP | Bob Bransby | 154 | 10.8 | N/A |
| Green | Aina Wylie | 152 | 10.7 | +1.4 |
| Labour | Diana Hale | 124 | 8.7 | −0.9 |
| Majority | | 181 | 12.8 | +8.5 |
| Turnout | | 1,425 | 35 | +4 |
| Liberal Democrats hold | | Swing | | |

=== Battledown ===
Battledown
| Party | Candidate | Votes | % | ±% |
|---|---|---|---|---|
| Conservative | Matt Babbage | 814 | 46.0 | −9.5 |
| Liberal Democrats | Paul McCloskey | 741 | 41.9 | +12.1 |
| UKIP | Lyn Bransby | 215 | 12.1 | N/A |
| Majority | | 73 | 4.1 | −21.6 |
| Turnout | | 1,789 | 42 | +9 |
| Conservative hold | | Swing | | |

=== Benhall and The Reddings ===
Benhall and The Reddings
| Party | Candidate | Votes | % | ±% |
|---|---|---|---|---|
| Liberal Democrats | Nigel Britter* | 1,188 | 66.7 | +30.0 |
| Conservative | Angela de Souza | 594 | 33.3 | −13.5 |
| Majority | | 594 | 33.4 | +23.3 |
| Turnout | | 1,829 | 45 | +3 |
| Liberal Democrats hold | | Swing | | |

=== Charlton Kings ===
Charlton Kings
| Party | Candidate | Votes | % | ±% |
|---|---|---|---|---|
| Liberal Democrats | Helena McCloskey* | 926 | 45.3 | −1.1 |
| Conservative | Tim Cooper | 638 | 31.2 | −10.6 |
| UKIP | Justin Dunne | 361 | 17.7 | N/A |
| Labour | Neville Mozley | 119 | 5.8 | N/A |
| Majority | | 288 | 14.1 | +9.5 |
| Turnout | | 2,053 | 47 | +5 |
| Liberal Democrats hold | | Swing | | |

=== Charlton Park ===
Charlton Park
| Party | Candidate | Votes | % | ±% |
|---|---|---|---|---|
| Liberal Democrats | Paul Baker | 861 | 45.9 | −1.0 |
| Conservative | Penny Hall* | 767 | 40.9 | −12.2 |
| UKIP | Justin Dunne | 154 | 8.2 | N/A |
| Labour | John Bride | 46 | 2.5 | N/A |
| Green | Wayne Spiller | 46 | 2.5 | N/A |
| Majority | | 94 | 5.0 | −1.2 |
| Turnout | | 1,875 | 47 | +5 |
| Liberal Democrats gain from Conservative | | Swing | | |

Note: the election in Charlton Park was delayed due to the death of a candidate. The election was held on 3 July 2014.

=== College ===
College
| Party | Candidate | Votes | % | ±% |
|---|---|---|---|---|
| Liberal Democrats | Garth Barnes* | 886 | 52.5 | −9.5 |
| Conservative | Emily Croft | 417 | 24.7 | −13.3 |
| Green | Sarah Field | 223 | 13.2 | N/A |
| UKIP | Sue Jones | 162 | 9.6 | N/A |
| Majority | | 469 | 27.8 | +3.8 |
| Turnout | | 1,698 | 41 | +7 |
| Liberal Democrats hold | | Swing | | |

=== Hesters Way ===
Hesters Way
| Party | Candidate | Votes | % | ±% |
|---|---|---|---|---|
| Liberal Democrats | Simon Wheeler* | 633 | 51.6 | −7.7 |
| Conservative | Janet Honeywill | 302 | 24.6 | +2.1 |
| Labour | Clive Harriss | 179 | 14.6 | −3.6 |
| TUSC | Andrew Causon | 113 | 9.2 | N/A |
| Majority | | 331 | 27.0 | −9.8 |
| Turnout | | 1,240 | 25 | +4 |
| Liberal Democrats hold | | Swing | | |

=== Lansdown ===
Lansdown
| Party | Candidate | Votes | % | ±% |
|---|---|---|---|---|
| Conservative | Chris Mason | 703 | 48.7 | −3.4 |
| Liberal Democrats | Mel Gladwin | 592 | 41.0 | −6.9 |
| Labour | Keith White | 148 | 10.3 | N/A |
| Majority | | 111 | 7.7 | +3.5 |
| Turnout | | 1,459 | 33 | +7 |
| Conservative hold | | Swing | | |

=== Leckhampton ===
Leckhampton
| Party | Candidate | Votes | % | ±% |
|---|---|---|---|---|
| Conservative | Chris Nelson | 813 | 36.4 | −7.0 |
| Independent | Ian Bickerton* | 516 | 23.1 | N/A |
| Liberal Democrats | Iain Dobie | 505 | 22.6 | −16.1 |
| UKIP | Ian Statham | 217 | 9.7 | −0.1 |
| Green | Barbara Knight-Elliott | 182 | 8.2 | +0.2 |
| Majority | | 297 | 13.3 | +8.6 |
| Turnout | | 2,240 | 53 | +11 |
| Conservative gain from Liberal Democrats | | Swing | | |

Note: Ian Bickerton was the sitting councillor. He was elected as a Liberal Democrat in 2010.

=== Oakley ===
Oakley
| Party | Candidate | Votes | % | ±% |
|---|---|---|---|---|
| Liberal Democrats | Colin Hay* | 575 | 45.5 | −9.4 |
| UKIP | John Hopwood | 328 | 25.9 | N/A |
| Labour | Alec Gamble | 189 | 15.0 | −5.8 |
| Conservative | Lucy Strachan | 172 | 13.6 | −3.6 |
| Majority | | 247 | 19.6 | −14.5 |
| Turnout | | 1,272 | 29 | +4 |
| Liberal Democrats hold | | Swing | | |

=== Park ===
Park
| Party | Candidate | Votes | % | ±% |
|---|---|---|---|---|
| Liberal Democrats | Max Wilkinson | 1,026 | 44.9 | +23.0 |
| Conservative | Rob Garnham* | 970 | 42.5 | −13.3 |
| Green | Victoria Angelo-Thompson | 186 | 8.1 | −5.1 |
| Labour | Kevin Boyle | 102 | 4.5 | N/A |
| Majority | | 56 | 2.4 | −31.5 |
| Turnout | | 2,292 | 45 | +11 |
| Liberal Democrats gain from Conservative | | Swing | | |

=== Pittville ===
Pittville
| Party | Candidate | Votes | % | ±% |
|---|---|---|---|---|
| PAB | Adam Lillywhite | 725 | 41.0 | −5.1 |
| Liberal Democrats | Dennis Parsons | 662 | 37.5 | +19.4 |
| Conservative | Paul Wood | 380 | 21.5 | −4.2 |
| Majority | | 63 | 3.5 | −16.9 |
| Turnout | | 1,781 | 42 | +5 |
| PAB hold | | Swing | | |

=== Prestbury ===
Prestbury
| Party | Candidate | Votes | % | ±% |
|---|---|---|---|---|
| PAB | John Payne | 1,524 | 76.4 | +4.4 |
| Conservative | Simon Probert | 306 | 15.3 | +−0.0 |
| Liberal Democrats | Abu Syed | 165 | 8.3 | −4.4 |
| Majority | | 1,218 | 61.1 | +4.4 |
| Turnout | | 2,010 | 45 | +7 |
| PAB hold | | Swing | | |

=== Springbank ===
Springbank
| Party | Candidate | Votes | % | ±% |
|---|---|---|---|---|
| Liberal Democrats | Peter Jeffries* | 648 | 47.6 | −17.7 |
| UKIP | Peter Joiner | 338 | 24.8 | N/A |
| Conservative | Elizabeth Fox | 200 | 14.7 | −1.7 |
| Labour | Anthony Cheetham | 145 | 10.7 | −7.6 |
| TUSC | Joe Sucksmith | 30 | 2.2 | N/A |
| Majority | | 310 | 22.6 | −24.4 |
| Turnout | | 1,367 | 28 | +7 |
| Liberal Democrats hold | | Swing | | |

=== St Mark's ===
St Mark's
| Party | Candidate | Votes | % | ±% |
|---|---|---|---|---|
| Liberal Democrats | Sandra Holliday* | 673 | 43.6 | −7.9 |
| UKIP | Peter Bowman | 371 | 24.0 | N/A |
| Conservative | Jerry Forrest | 239 | 15.5 | −6.2 |
| Labour | Rod Gay | 133 | 8.6 | −8.4 |
| Green | Demelza Jones | 128 | 8.3 | −1.5 |
| Majority | | 302 | 19.6 | −10.2 |
| Turnout | | 1,552 | 33 | +6 |
| Liberal Democrats hold | | Swing | | |

=== St Paul's ===
St Paul's
| Party | Candidate | Votes | % | ±% |
|---|---|---|---|---|
| Liberal Democrats | Jon Walklett* | 299 | 30.2 | −21.0 |
| Conservative | Andrew Coffey | 157 | 15.9 | −2.0 |
| Labour | Ann Gate | 151 | 15.3 | −4.8 |
| NHA | Neil Beck | 135 | 13.7 | N/A |
| Independent | Daud McDonald | 130 | 13.1 | N/A |
| Green | Adrian Becker | 117 | 11.8 | +1.0 |
| Majority | | 142 | 14.3 | −16.8 |
| Turnout | | 993 | 21 | +6 |
| Liberal Democrats hold | | Swing | | |

=== St Peter's ===
St Peter's
| Party | Candidate | Votes | % | ±% |
|---|---|---|---|---|
| Liberal Democrats | Pat Thornton* | 695 | 47.1 | −16.7 |
| UKIP | Barry Lodge | 332 | 22.5 | N/A |
| Conservative | Jonathan Moffitt | 253 | 17.2 | −2.5 |
| Labour | Robert Irons | 195 | 13.2 | −3.3 |
| Majority | | 363 | 24.6 | −19.5 |
| Turnout | | 1,480 | 29 | +7 |
| Liberal Democrats hold | | Swing | | |

=== Swindon Village ===
Swindon Village
| Party | Candidate | Votes | % | ±% |
|---|---|---|---|---|
| Liberal Democrats | Flo Clucas | 835 | 66.3 | −9.8 |
| Conservative | Sophie Tartaglia | 424 | 33.7 | +9.8 |
| Majority | | 411 | 32.6 | −19.6 |
| Turnout | | 1,323 | 30 | +5 |
| Liberal Democrats hold | | Swing | | |

=== Up Hatherley ===
Up Hatherley
| Party | Candidate | Votes | % | ±% |
|---|---|---|---|---|
| Liberal Democrats | Andrew McKinlay* | 990 | 50.4 | −1.7 |
| Conservative | John Young | 562 | 28.6 | −3.3 |
| UKIP | Jeff Hack | 305 | 15.5 | −0.4 |
| Labour | Catherine Mozley | 108 | 5.5 | N/A |
| Majority | | 428 | 21.8 | +1.6 |
| Turnout | | 1,970 | 47 | +5 |
| Liberal Democrats hold | | Swing | | |

=== Warden Hill ===
Warden Hill
| Party | Candidate | Votes | % | ±% |
|---|---|---|---|---|
| Conservative | Chris Ryder* | 740 | 39.3 | −21.5 |
| Liberal Democrats | Tony Oliver | 666 | 35.4 | +14.0 |
| UKIP | Roger Tasker | 337 | 17.9 | N/A |
| Green | Timothy Bonsor | 138 | 7.3 | −10.5 |
| Majority | | 74 | 3.9 | −35.5 |
| Turnout | | 1,887 | 43 | +7 |
| Conservative gain from Liberal Democrats | | Swing | | |

Note: the Conservatives had previously gained the Liberal Democrat seat in Warden Hill in a by-election. This election confirmed that by-election gain.
