= Ann Jellicoe =

British actress, theatre director and playwright (1927–2017)

- Born: Patricia Ann Jellicoe; 15 July 1927; Middlesbrough, Yorkshire, England, U.K.
- Died: 31 August 2017 (aged 90)
- Education: Royal Central School of Speech and Drama
- Occupations: Playwright, theatre director, actress
- Spouse: Roger Mayne (1962–2014, his death)

Patricia Ann Jellicoe OBE (15 July 1927 – 31 August 2017) was an English playwright, theatre director and actress. She is most notable for having pursued innovations in the dramatic arts.

== Biography ==
Jellicoe was born in Middlesbrough, Yorkshire in England in 1927 and from childhood showed an interest and an aptitude for the theatre. She attended Polam Hall School and Queen Margaret's School, York and studied performing arts at the Central School of Speech and Drama. This was followed by experience in repertory and fringe theatre.

Jellicoe established a Sunday Theatre Club (Cockpit Theatre Club) where she produced and directed a number of plays exploring the possibilities of open stage theatre, including a one-act of her own.

Thereafter, Jellicoe used many of her plays to further explore her innovative ideas on theatre. In 1956, The Observer established a playwright's competition to find new talent. Jellicoe submitted The Sport of My Mad Mother, which won a prize in the competition. In writing this play Jellicoe applied many of the ideas she had learnt in her early years at Central School. The play was subsequently staged by the Royal Court Theatre and directed by George Devine and Jellicoe. Although originally a commercial failure, the play was later performed internationally in many languages. Set in a Cockney neighbourhood of London, it combines realism, mysticism, music, dance, and ritual to create a feminist myth about modern civilisation. The play's title derives from a Hindu religious saying: "All creation is the sport of my mad mother Kali" (a Hindu goddess). Among London audiences, "the sport of me mad mother" might be recognized as a Cockney expression implying something highly unusual. Jellicoe revised the original 1958 version in 1962.

Jellicoe's most notable play is The Knack, first performed at the Royal Court in 1962. A major hit, the play was later adapted into a film version which won the Palme d'Or at Cannes. Directed by Richard Lester, the film's cast included Michael Crawford and Rita Tushingham.

Jellicoe has also written plays for children.

In 1962, Jellicoe married the photographer Roger Mayne. They moved to Lyme Regis in Dorset in 1975, and lived at Colway Manor. In 1978, Jellicoe set up the Colway Theatre Trust to explore the concept of community plays: pioneering work which she continued to develop over the next ten years. A community play as practised by Colway is the result of no less than 18 months work. They are original plays written for and about a specific community. The writer generally works with a community research team. Plays are traditionally performed in a promenade style where the audience and cast share the same space with action happening on stages around the edge of that space and in the body of the standing audience. In 2000, Colway Theatre relocated to Kent in South East England and changed its name to Claque.

After Mayne died in 2014, Jellicoe moved to West Bay in Dorset. Jellicoe herself died at the end of August 2017.

== Selected works ==
Following list from Who's Who

- The Knack: A Comedy in Three Acts. London: Encore, 1962; New York: French, 1962.
- The Sport of My Mad Mother. Revised version. London: Faber, 1964; New York: Dell, 1964. Originally published in The Observer Plays, London: Faber & Faber, 1958.
- Shelley; or, The Idealist. London: Faber & Faber, 1966; New York: Grove Press, 1966.
- Some Unconscious Influences in the Theatre. Cambridge: Cambridge University Press, 1967. Judith Wilson Lecture, 1967.
- The Giveaway: A Comedy. London: Faber & Faber, 1970.
- The Seagull by Anton Chekhov, translated by Jellicoe & Adriadne Nicolaeff. New York: Avon, 1975.
- Three Jelliplays. London: Faber & Faber, 1975. Contains You'll Never Guess; Clever Elsie, Smiling John, Silent Peter, and A Good Thing or a Bad Thing.
- Devon, by Jellicoe and Roger Mayne. London: Faber & Faber, 1975. A Shell Guide.
- Community Plays: How to Put Them On. London: Methuer, 1987.

Community Plays: Writer, Director & Producer:

- The Reckoning, Lyme Regis, 1978
- The Tide, Axe Valley, 1980
- Mark og Mont, (Money & Land) Holbaek, Denmark 1989
- Under the God, Dorchester, 1989
- Changing Places, Woking, 1992

Community plays by other writers: director and/or producer including: Howard Barker, David Edgar, Charles Wood, John Downie, Sheila Yeger, Andrew Dickson, Arnold Wesker, David Cregan, Nick Darke, Peter Terson and Jon Oram

National Life Stories conducted an oral history interview (C1316/04) with Ann Jellicoe in 2008 for its The Legacy of the English Stage Company held by the British Library.
