= Roger Mayne =

British photographer (1929–2014)

Roger Mayne (5 May 1929 – 7 June 2014) was an English photographer, best known for his documentation of the children of Southam Street, London.

== Life and work ==
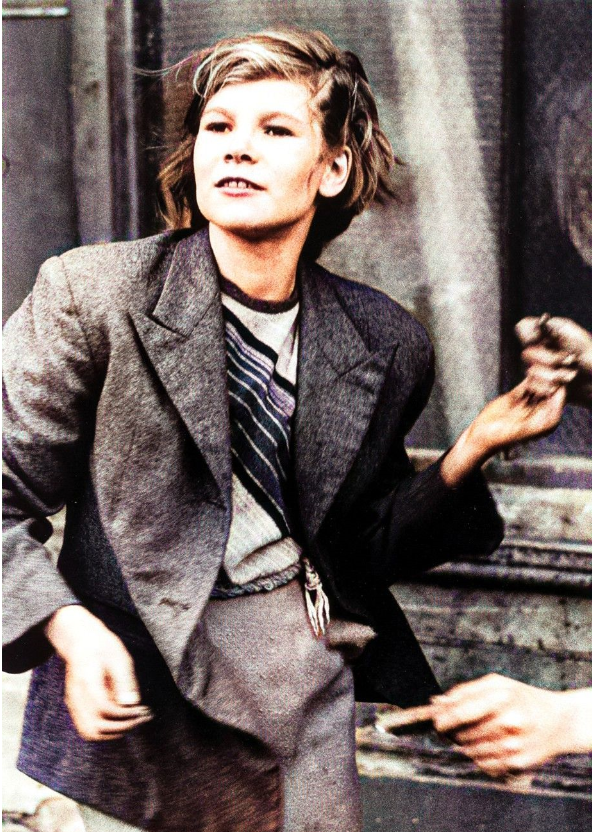
"Girl Jiving", Southam Street, 1957

Born in Cambridge, Mayne studied Chemistry at Balliol College, Oxford University. Here he became interested in photographic processing, and met Hugo van Wadenoyen, a key figure in British photography's break with pictorialism. On graduating in 1951 Mayne contributed pictures to Picture Post, and was an occasional film stills photographer. In the early 1950s he made photographic portraits of many residents in the artist's-colony town of St. Ives, Cornwall. He operated very much in an aesthetic vacuum, struggling to find any coherent tradition of British photography to follow. In 1956 he had a one-man show of his portraits at the ICA (UK), and George Eastman House (US). By 1957 he was established as a freelance photographer for London magazines and book-jacket designers.

With some financial and limited curatorial security established, he began to look for a significant personal project. He found it in the street life of Southam Street in Notting Dale (now often considered part of Notting Hill), which he photographed between 1956 and 1961. The novelist Colin MacInnes asked Mayne to contribute the cover shot for Absolute Beginners (1959), which is set in the area around Southam Street. The Southam Street collection is of national importance, and is now held by the Victoria and Albert Museum, London.

Most of Southam Street was demolished in 1969 to make way for Trellick Tower; a small section still exists. Mayne's Southam Street work had a major retrospective exhibition at the Victoria and Albert Museum in 1986; and was brought to a new audience in the 1990s, through being extensively used for concert backdrops, record sleeves and press-adverts by the singer Morrissey.

In the early 1960s Mayne moved into colour photography, photographing Greece and Spain, artists and their studios, and then landscapes, and publishing work in the mid and late 1960s in the new Sunday Times and Observer colour magazines.

In 1962, Mayne married the playwright Ann Jellicoe. They moved to Lyme Regis in Dorset in 1975.

A major exhibition of his portraits was held at the National Portrait Gallery in 2004, and there have been other major exhibitions at Victoria Art Gallery, Bath (2013) and at The Photographers' Gallery, London (2017). He was represented in an important exhibition at Tate, Liverpool in 2006. Mayne's work is also seen in the film version of Absolute Beginners.

Mayne's tenure at the Bath Academy of Art was a seminal influence on his student, the cinematographer Roger Deakins

== Exhibitions ==
=== Solo exhibitions ===
- Photographs from London, ICA, London, 1956.
- Daughter and Sun, Half Moon Gallery, London, 1972.
- Roger Mayne photographs 1964–73, The Photographers' Gallery, London, 1974.
- Roger Mayne: landscape photographs, Newlyn Gallery, Penzance, 1980.
- Roger Mayne: street photographs 1956–61, South Bank Centre, London, 1987.
- Roger Mayne, Gitterman Gallery, New York, 2004.
- Seizing an Instant, National Portrait Gallery, London, 2004.
- Roger Mayne, Gitterman Gallery, New York, 2007.
- Roger Mayne at 80: A celebratory exhibition of photographs, Bernard Quaritch, London, 2009.
- Victoria Art Gallery, Bath, January–April 2013.
- The Photographers' Gallery, London, March–June 2017.

=== Group exhibitions ===
- Making history: Art and documentary in Britain from 1929 to now, Tate Liverpool, Liverpool, 2006. With works by Bill Brandt, Vanley Burke, William Coldstream, Nathan Coley, Nick Hedges, Nigel Henderson, Tony Ray-Jones, Humphrey Spender and Julian Trevelyan.
- Selektion #1: Arbeiten in Schwarz/Weiß, Galerie f5,6, Galerie für Fotografische Kunst, Munich, 2006.
- After Image: Social Documentary Photography in the 20th century, National Gallery of Victoria, Melbourne, 2007.
- Straßenfotografie – Meisterwerke aus drei Jahrhunderten, Kunsthaus Kaufbeuren, Kaufbeuren, 2007.

== Collections ==
- Art Institute of Chicago, Chicago, Illinois.
- J. Paul Getty Museum, Los Angeles.
- Metropolitan Museum of Art, New York.
- National Portrait Gallery, London.
- Princeton University Art Museum, Princeton, New Jersey.
- Victoria and Albert Museum, London.
