= Broadoak Academy =

Broadoak Academy...
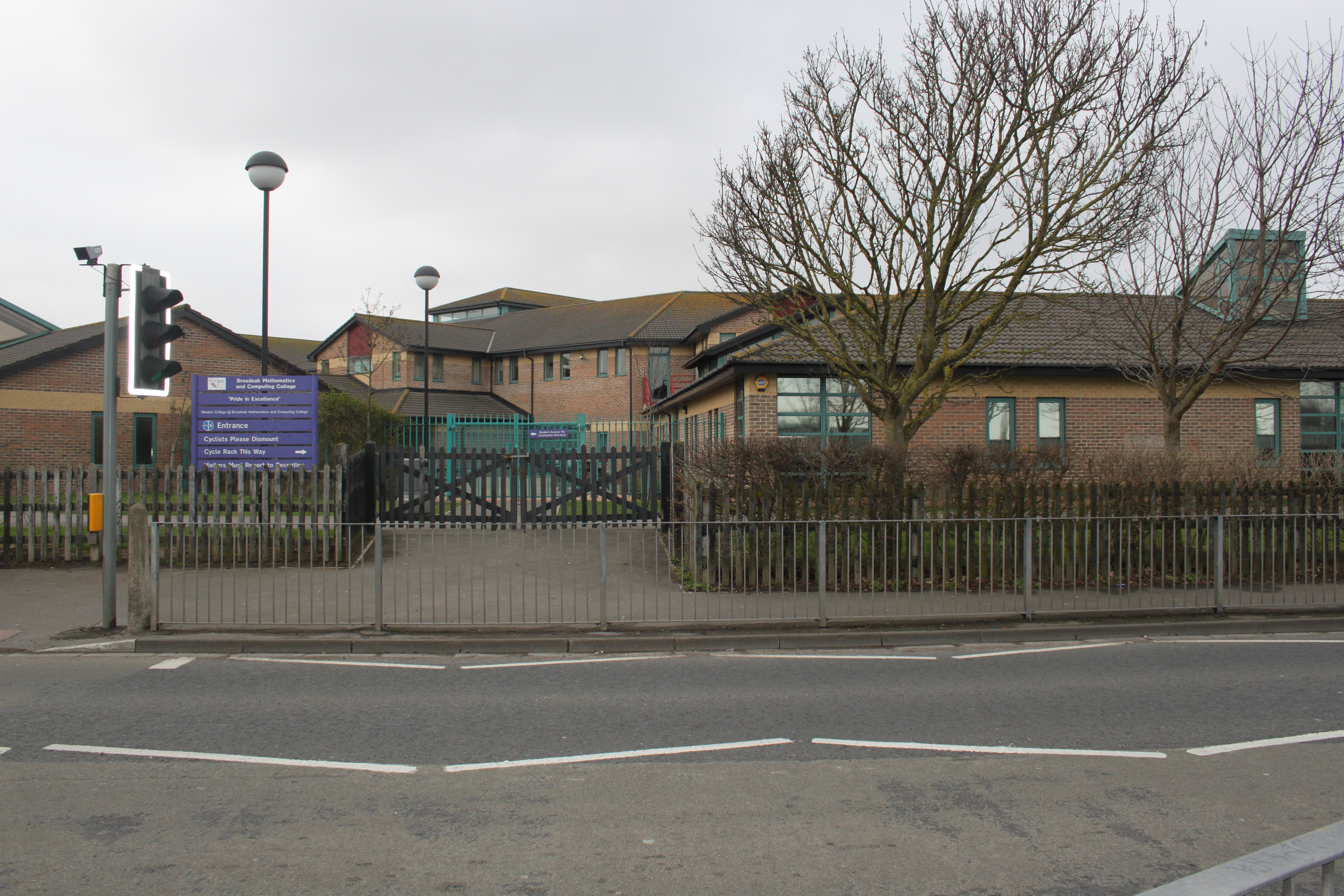

Location
- Windwhistle Road; Weston-super-Mare, Somerset, BS23 4NP; England; 51.3288°N 2.9761°W

Information
- Type: Academy
- Established: 1922; 104 years ago
- Local authority: North Somerset Council
- Trust: Cabot Learning Federation
- Department for Education URN: 147351 Tables
- Ofsted: Reports
- Head: Ian Walsh
- Gender: Coeducational
- Age: 11 to 16
- Enrolment: 902 (2012)
- Website: broadoakacademy.clf.uk

Broadoak Academy is a coeducational secondary school located in Weston-super-Mare, North Somerset, England.

== History ==
Secondary education in Weston-super-Mare adopted the Comprehensive system in 1971. Broadoak School was formed by the amalgamation of the Boys' and Girls' Grammar Schools together with Uphill primary Modern School. The grammar became a comprehensive school in 1971, when it also admitted girls and changed its name to Broadoak. At the same time, the nearby Uphill Secondary Modern School in Oldmixon became the sixth form centre for Broadoak School.

Following a decline in student numbers, the sixth form was taken over by Weston College in 1999. The old grammar school buildings were demolished and replaced by a new school building in 1999. The former sixth form centre was demolished by Weston College in 2006. It was replaced by a new university and sixth form campus, which included the Jill Dando Centre, named after Broadoak sixth form student and head girl Jill Dando.

In the 2002–2003 academic year the headteacher of The Kings of Wessex School in Cheddar was seconded to the school by the local education authority, after the school's governors lost control of their budget in March 2002, when they reached a £250,000 deficit.

Broadoak became a specialist school in September 2005 and changed its name to Broadoak Mathematics and Computing College.

Previously a community school administered by North Somerset Council, in February 2012 Broadoak Mathematics and Computing College converted to academy status. In July 2019 the school was formally renamed as Broadoak Academy, and is now sponsored by the Cabot Learning Federation.

== Academic achievement ==
In 2023 Ofsted rated the school as “Good”.

In 2007, the school was given the Artsmark award by the Arts Council England.

== Notable alumni ==
=== Weston Boys' Grammar School ===
- Hugh Dykes, now Lord Dykes a Liberal Democrat peer
- Brian Rose, former Somerset County Cricket Club and England cricketer
