= Hugo van Wadenoyen =

British photographer (1892–1959)

Hugo van Wadenoyen (July 18, 1892 in Vlaardingen, Netherlands – March 1, 1959 in Cheltenham) was a British photographer, of Dutch origins. He lived in Cheltenham, England, and was an influential figure in the long drawn-out genesis of British fine art photography, especially between 1945 and 1965.

== Biography ==
Van Wadenoyen moved from the Netherlands to Cardiff, Wales in 1900, where his father would start a photographic studio.

== Photography ==
He became a Fellow of the Royal Photographic Society in 1919 at age twenty-six and in his early years took photographs in a Pictorialist style. In 1945, Van Wadenoyen led the "Combined Societies," a progressive group of local photographic societies (Hereford, Wolverhampton, and Bristol) that broke away from the moribund Royal Photographic Society.

He undertook a series of instructional books on photography, published by the Focal Press.

Van Wadenoyen's book Wayside Snapshots (Focal Press, 1947) marked a decisive British break with Pictorialism in photography, was a brave early attempt to use the book format as a means of showing a photographer's personal pictures. Some of the book's fresh approaches to landscape strongly influenced Raymond Moore. Van Wadenoyen was also a mentor to Roger Mayne, involving Mayne in the Combined Societies group exhibitions between 1951 and 1955.

== Works ==
- Instructional books on photography published by Focal Press (circa 1940s), edited by Andor Kraszna-Krausz
  - No. 4: All about PORTRAITS and Your Camera
  - No. 7: All about LAND, SEA, SKY and Your Camera
  - No. 9: All about DAYLIGHT INDOORS and Your Camera
  - No. 13: All about ONE LAMP ONLY and Your Camera
  - No. 14: All about THE SECOND LAMP and Your Camera
  - No. 17: All about AGAINST THE SUN EFFECTS and Your Camera (1941)
- Photographing People: Ways to New Portraiture (London, New York: Focal Press, 1939)
- with John Holtan, Making an Enlarger from Functional Plans (London: Focal Press, 1960? 2nd ed.)
