= 2018 Cheltenham Borough Council election =

2018 UK local government election

- 3 May 2018

21 out of 40 seats to Cheltenham Borough Council 21 seats needed for a majority
	First party	Second party
Party	Liberal Democrats	Conservative
Seats before	29	7
Seats won	17	3
Seats after	32	6
Seat change	▲3	▼1
Popular vote	15,504	12,196
Percentage	45.8%	36.0%
	Third party
Party	PAB
Seats before	3
Seats won	1
Seats after	2
Seat change	▼1
Popular vote	1,450
Percentage	5.4%
- Map showing the results of the 2018 Cheltenham Borough Council elections by ward. Yellow shows the Liberal Democrats, blue shows the Conservatives and black People Against Bureaucracy.
Council control before election
Liberal Democrat
Council control after election
Liberal Democrat

The 2018 Cheltenham Borough Council election was held on 3 May 2018 to elect members of Cheltenham Borough Council in England. This was on the same day as other local elections. The result was a victory for the incumbent Liberal Democrat administration, which increased its overall majority.

== Overall results ==
Party	Previous council	New council	+/-
Liberal Democrats	29	32	▲3
Conservatives	7	6	▼1
People Against Bureaucracy	3	2	▼1
Independent	1	0	▼1
Total	40	40	

Cheltenham Borough Council Election Result 2018
Party	Seats	Gains	Losses	Net gain/loss	Seats %	Votes %	Votes	+/−
Liberal Democrats	17	3	0	+3	81.0	45.8	15,504	+0.3
Conservative	3	0	1	-1	14.3	36.0	12,196	+6.7
Labour	0	0	0	0	0.0	7.7	2,600	+1.4
PAB	1	0	1	-1	4.8	5.4	1,450	-1.4
Green	0	0	0	0	0.0	4.3	1,450	-1.9
Independent	0	0	1	-1	0.0	0.8	268	-2.5

== Ward results ==
=== All Saints ===
All Saints
Party	Candidate	Votes	%	±%
Liberal Democrats	Alex Hegenbarth*	674	47.1	−5.4
Conservative	Ben Stone	522	36.5	+5.9
Labour	Derek Anthony Nigel Lockhart	139	9.7	−1.9
Green	Sarah Jane Field	96	6.7	−0.6
Majority		152	10.6	−13.3
Turnout		1,433	34	−1
Liberal Democrats hold		Swing		

=== Battledown ===
Battledown
Party	Candidate	Votes	%	±%
Conservative	Matt Babbage*	971	58.2	+2.6
Liberal Democrats	Susan Jane Allen	503	30.1	+1.1
Labour	Caroline Adele Gavin	108	6.5	−2.5
Green	Spencer Richard Allman	87	5.2	−1.2
Majority		468	28.1	+1.5
Turnout		1,672	38	+1
Conservative hold		Swing		

=== Benhall & The Reddings ===
Benhall & The Reddings
Party	Candidate	Votes	%	±%
Liberal Democrats	Nigel Charles Britter*	1,036	55.3	+5.7
Conservative	James William Harold Russell	746	39.8	−2.0
Labour	Francis Xavier Chacko	91	4.9	+1.0
Majority		290	15.5	+7.7
Turnout		1,873	47	+1
Liberal Democrats hold		Swing		

=== Charlton Kings ===
Charlton Kings
Party	Candidate	Votes	%	±%
Liberal Democrats	Angie Boyes	915	47.8	−1.4
Conservative	Dan Collins	747	39.0	+1.4
Labour	Joanna Susan Hughes	150	7.8	+1.6
Green	Lorraine Elizabeth Mason	101	5.3	−1.7
Majority		168	8.8	−2.8
Turnout		1,921	44	−1
Liberal Democrats hold		Swing		

=== Charlton Park ===
Charlton Park
Party	Candidate	Votes	%	±%
Liberal Democrats	Paul Richard Baker*	1,050	49.2	−2.2
Conservative	David Grahame Lewis	962	45.1	+5.0
Green	Karen Wilson	68	3.2	+0.1
Labour	David John Beesley	54	2.5	−2.9
Majority		88	4.1	−7.2
Turnout		2,136	53	+3
Liberal Democrats hold		Swing		

=== College ===
College
Party	Candidate	Votes	%	±%
Liberal Democrats	Garth Wallington Barnes*	976	57.7	−5.3
Conservative	Peter Frantz Vagn	448	26.5	+4.6
Labour	Lynda Peggy Johnson	162	9.6	+4.6
Green	Drew Alexander Davie	105	6.2	+0.2
Majority		528	31.2	−9.9
Turnout		1,692	38	−2
Liberal Democrats hold		Swing		

=== Hesters Way ===
Hesters Way
Party	Candidate	Votes	%	±%
Liberal Democrats	Simon Albert Wheeler*	669	55.0	+2.3
Conservative	Stephen Charles Lovatt	386	31.7	+0.3
Labour	Clive Robert Harriss	161	13.2	+4.2
Majority		283	23.3	+2.0
Turnout		1,218	24	−1
Liberal Democrats hold		Swing		

=== Lansdown ===
Lansdown
Party	Candidate	Votes	%	±%
Conservative	Chris Mason*	720	52.9	±0.0
Liberal Democrats	Barbara Anne Clark	406	29.8	+5.0
Labour	Miranda Jane Latham-Jackson	148	10.9	−0.6
Green	Adrian Becker	87	6.4	−4.3
Majority		314	23.1	−5.0
Turnout		1,362	33	+3
Conservative hold		Swing		

=== Leckhampton ===
Leckhampton
Party	Candidate	Votes	%	±%
Liberal Democrats	Martin Horwood	1,082	47.2	+27.2
Conservative	Stephen Cooke	1,069	46.6	+18.1
Conservative	Chris Nelson*	1,067	46.5	+18.0
Liberal Democrats	Glenn Andrews	834	36.4	+16.4
Green	Peter Frings	302	13.2	+8.4
Labour	Steve Harrop	78	3.4	+0.4
Labour	Christopher Meehan	56	2.4	−0.6
Majority		13	0.1	−11.5
Turnout		2,293	52	+4
Liberal Democrats gain from Independent		Swing		
Conservative hold		Swing		

=== Oakley ===
Oakley
Party	Candidate	Votes	%	±%
Liberal Democrats	Max Wilkinson**	768	54.2	+6.9
Labour	Liz Ashley	331	23.4	+4.1
Conservative	Ben Carlton	317	22.4	−3.9
Majority		437	30.8	+9.8
Turnout		1,320	33	+4
Liberal Democrats hold		Swing		

Max Wilkinson was a sitting councillor in Park.

=== Park ===
Park
Party	Candidate	Votes	%	±%
Liberal Democrats	Dilys Mary Juliet Barrell	1,154	47.6	+4.4
Conservative	Laura Elizabeth Kennedy	1,101	45.4	−1.5
Labour	Kevin Michael Boyle	91	3.8	−1.4
Green	Barbara Anne Knight-Elliott	77	3.2	−1.6
Majority		53	2.2	−1.5
Turnout		2,430	50	+5
Liberal Democrats hold		Swing		

=== Pittville ===
Pittville
Party	Candidate	Votes	%	±%
Liberal Democrats	Jo Stafford	628	31.7	−14.3
Conservative	Stephen Alexander Fifield	624	31.5	+16.5
PAB	Adam Lewis Kirkham Lillywhite*	514	25.9	−3.5
Labour	Andrew James Nicholson	150	7.6	+2.6
Green	Stephen John Bear	65	3.3	−1.3
Majority		4	0.2	−16.4
Turnout		1,984	41	±0
Liberal Democrats gain from PAB		Swing		

=== Prestbury ===
Prestbury
Party	Candidate	Votes	%	±%
PAB	John Payne*	1,324	65.7	−3.3
Liberal Democrats	Catherine Jane Stimpson	411	20.4	+8.8
Conservative	Jerry Forrest	279	13.9	−1.0
Majority		913	45.3	−8.8
Turnout		2,022	44	+4
PAB hold		Swing		

=== Springbank ===
Springbank
Party	Candidate	Votes	%	±%
Liberal Democrats	Peter Jeremy Jeffries*	818	64.3	+7.3
Conservative	Rich Newman	323	25.4	+4.6
Labour	John Malcolm Bride	132	10.4	N/A
Majority		495	38.9	+2.7
Turnout		1,277	25	−4
Liberal Democrats hold		Swing		

=== St Mark’s ===
St Mark’s
Party	Candidate	Votes	%	±%
Liberal Democrats	Sandra Jane Holliday*	676	52.8	−10.1
Conservative	Joshua David William	356	27.8	+15.7
Labour	Matthew James Bevington	159	12.4	+3.7
Green	David John Clarke	89	7.0	+0.5
Majority		320	25.0	−25.8
Turnout		1,284	26	−5
Liberal Democrats hold		Swing		

=== St Paul’s ===
St Paul’s
Party	Candidate	Votes	%	±%
Liberal Democrats	Jonny Brownsteen	442	38.8	+2.2
Labour	Craig Francis Fraser	293	25.7	+9.7
Independent	Daud McDonald	268	23.5	−2.8
Conservative	Tamba Abass Manyeh	136	11.9	+1.0
Majority		149	13.1	−0.2
Turnout		1,142	26	+5
Liberal Democrats hold		Swing		

=== St Peter’s ===
St Peter’s
Party	Candidate	Votes	%	±%
Liberal Democrats	Victoria May Atherstone	617	39.9	−6.6
Conservative	Hannah Wright	507	32.8	+6.7
Green	Jim Blackstock	278	18.0	−0.3
Labour	Robert Ramuz Irons	145	9.4	+0.3
Majority		110	7.1	−13.3
Turnout		1,548	29	±0
Liberal Democrats hold		Swing		

=== Swindon Village ===
Swindon Village
Party	Candidate	Votes	%	±%
Liberal Democrats	Flo Clucas*	744	62.1	+16.8
Conservative	Edward Wadih Hazzan	455	37.9	+24.3
Majority		289	24.2	+12.9
Turnout		1,217	27	−4
Liberal Democrats hold		Swing		

=== Up Hatherley ===
Up Hatherley
Party	Candidate	Votes	%	±%
Liberal Democrats	Andrew McKinlay*	1,015	56.9	−7.6
Conservative	Emma Jane Logan	645	36.2	+15.7
Labour	Kenneth Syme	124	7.0	+3.2
Majority		370	20.7	−23.3
Turnout		1,788	43	±0
Liberal Democrats hold		Swing		

=== Warden Hill ===
Warden Hill
Party	Candidate	Votes	%	±%
Liberal Democrats	Iain Andrew Paterson Dobie	920	46.4	−0.6
Conservative	Margaret Emma Frances Nelson	882	44.5	+12.4
Green	Timothy Cosmo Bonsor	95	4.8	−0.1
Labour	Ian Hugh White	84	4.2	−2.3
Majority		38	1.9	−13.0
Turnout		1,983	45	+4
Liberal Democrats gain from Conservative		Swing		
