= Cheltenham Borough Council =

Local authority in Gloucestershire, England

Type
- Type: Non-metropolitan district

Leadership
- Mayor: Martin Horwood, Liberal Democrat since 18 May 2026
- Leader: Rowena Hay, Liberal Democrats since 7 December 2020
- Chief Executive: Gareth Edmundson since 2019

Structure
- Seats: 40 councillors
- Graph of the party split among 40 seats.
- Political groups: Administration (35) Liberal Democrats (35) Other parties (5) Green (3) PAB (1) Reform (1)

Elections
- Voting system: First past the post
- Last election: 7 May 2026

Meeting place
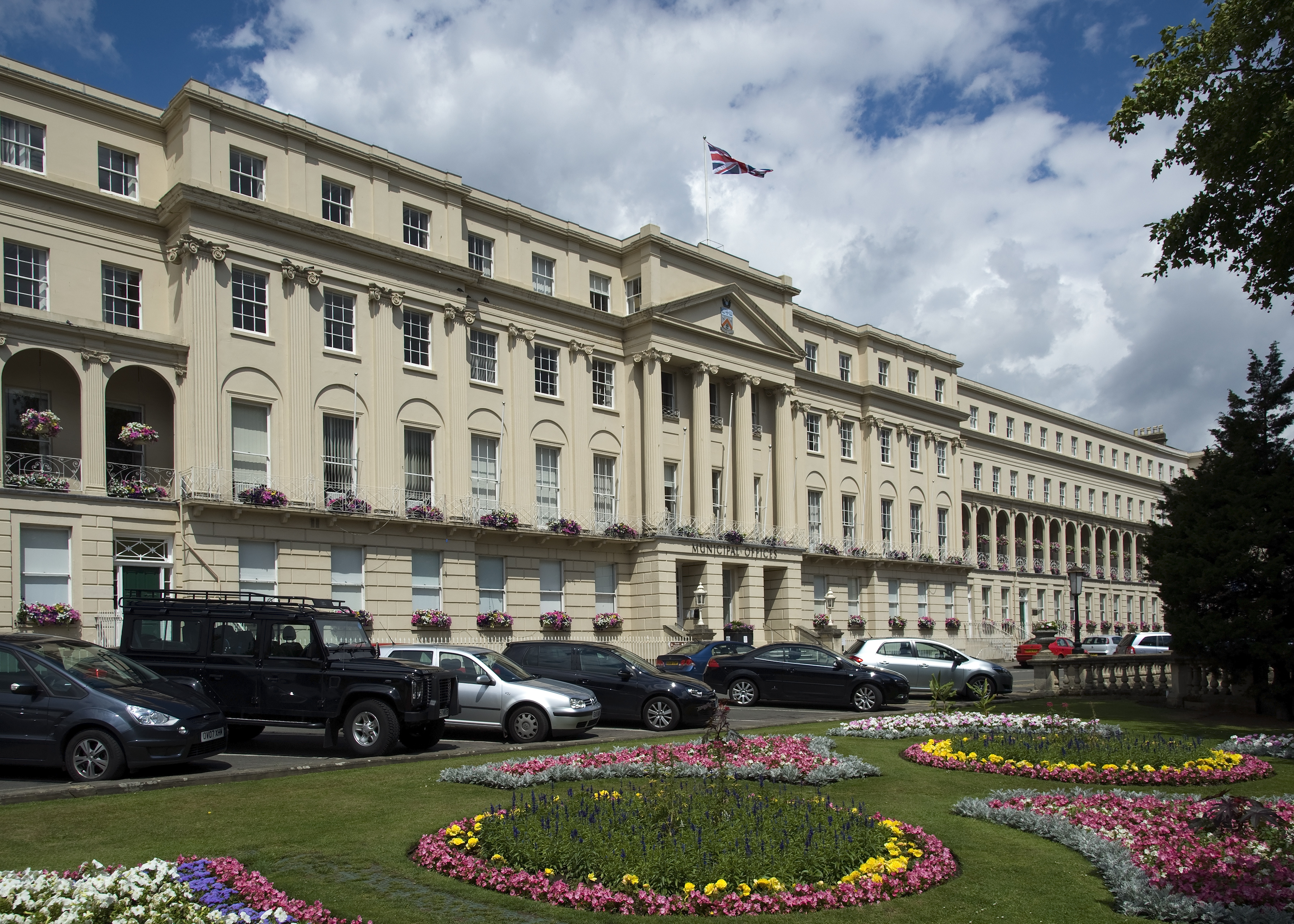
- Municipal Offices, Promenade, Cheltenham, GL50 9SA

Website
- www.cheltenham.gov.uk

Cheltenham Borough Council is the local authority for Cheltenham, a non-metropolitan district with borough status in Gloucestershire, England. The council is based at the Municipal Offices on the Promenade.

The neighbouring districts are Tewkesbury and Cotswold.

== History ==
The town of Cheltenham was incorporated as a municipal borough in 1876, governed by a body formally called the "mayor, aldermen and burgesses of the borough of Cheltenham", but generally known as the corporation or town council. Prior to 1876 the town had been administered by a body of improvement commissioners which had been established in 1786.

The borough was reformed in 1974 under the Local Government Act 1972, becoming a non-metropolitan district and absorbing the area of the former Charlton Kings urban district at the same time. Cheltenham kept its borough status, allowing the council to take the name Cheltenham Borough Council and letting the chair of the council take the title of mayor, continuing Cheltenham's series of mayors dating back to 1876.

The borough was further enlarged in 1991 when it gained the parishes of Leckhampton, Prestbury, Swindon and Up Hatherley, all of which had previously been in Tewkesbury borough.

Under current local government reorganisation plans, the council will be abolished from 2028, with a single council for all of the current Gloucestershire County Council area.

== Governance ==
Cheltenham Borough Council provides district-level services. County-level services are provided by Gloucestershire County Council. Parts of the borough are also covered by civil parishes, which form a third tier of local government. The rest of the borough, roughly corresponding to the pre-1974 municipal borough, is an unparished area.

=== Political control ===
The council has been under Liberal Democrat majority control since 2010.

Political control of the council since the 1974 reforms has been as follows:

Party in control	Years
Conservative	1974–1979
No overall control	1979–1991
Liberal Democrats	1991–1999
No overall control	1999–2000
Conservative	2000–2002
Liberal Democrats	2002–2004
No overall control	2004–2010
Liberal Democrats	2010–present

=== Leadership ===
The role of mayor is largely ceremonial in Cheltenham. Political leadership is instead provided by the leader of the council. The leaders since 2002 have been:

Councillor	Party	From	To
Andrew McKinlay	Liberal Democrats	10 May 2002	May 2006
Duncan Smith	Conservative	11 May 2006	May 2008
Steve Jordan	Liberal Democrats	8 May 2008	7 Dec 2020
Rowena Hay	Liberal Democrats	7 Dec 2020	

=== Composition ===
Following the 2026 election, the composition of the council was:

Party	Councillors
Liberal Democrats	35
Green	3
People Against Bureaucracy	1
Reform UK	1
Total	40

== Premises ==
The council is based at the Municipal Offices on the Promenade. The building was built as a row of 19 terraced houses called Harward's Buildings between 1823 and 1840. Seven houses in the terrace were acquired by Cheltenham Borough Council in 1916 and converted to become their offices, with the other houses being acquired later.

== Elections ==
Since the last boundary changes in 2024 the council has comprised 40 councillors representing 20 wards, with each ward electing two councillors. Elections are held in alternate years, with half the council (one councillor for each ward) being elected each time for a four-year term of office.

The 2026 borough elections were held on 7 May, following the government's decision in February to withdraw the postponement of the elections.

== Local government reorganisation ==
In July 2026, the government announced that Cheltenham Borough Council would be replaced as part of a new single unitary council for Gloucestershire. The new council, which will bring together the existing county, district, borough and city councils, is due to take effect on 1 April 2028. Elections to a shadow authority are scheduled for May 2027.The new authority will be known as Gloucestershire Council and will have 110 councillors.

== Coat of arms ==
Cheltenham’s coat-of-arms were granted in 1877, and are still in use by the council.

Armorial achievement	Blazon	References
	Crest Upon a mount between two branches of oak proper, a fountain thereon a pigeon proper. === Escutcheon === Or, a chevron engrailed gules between two pigeons argent in chief and an uprooted oak tree in base proper; atop, a chief azure under a cross flory argent between two open books proper binding. === Motto === SALUBRITAS ET ERUDITIO	
