= Haydon Wick =

Civil parish in Swindon, Wiltshire, England

Coordinates: 51.595°N 1.815°W

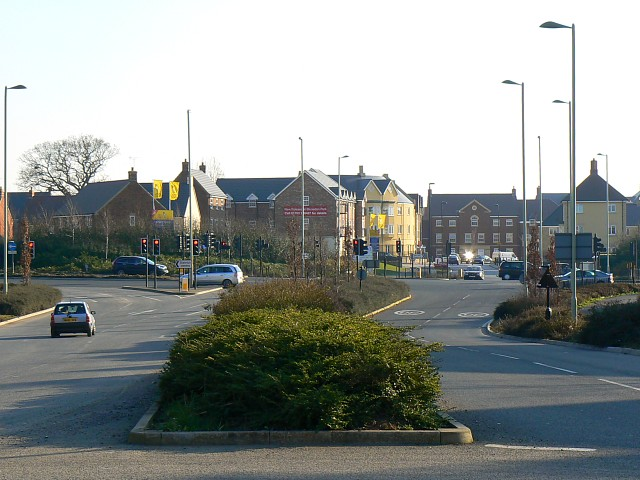

- Location within Wiltshire
- Population: 25,036 (in 2021)
- OS grid reference: SU129885
- Civil parish: Haydon Wick
- Unitary authority: Swindon
- Ceremonial county: Wiltshire
- Region: South West
- Country: England
- Sovereign state: United Kingdom
- Post town: Swindon
- Postcode district: SN25
- Dialling code: 01793
- Police: Wiltshire
- Fire: Dorset and Wiltshire
- Ambulance: South Western
- UK Parliament: Swindon North
- Website: Parish Council

Haydon Wick is a suburb and civil parish of Swindon, Wiltshire, England. It had a population of 25,036 at the 2021 census. The parish includes the former hamlet of Haydon and the suburbs of Greenmeadow and Priory Vale.

== Government ==
The first tier of local government is Haydon Wick Parish Council, with two electoral wards: Haydon Wick (9 councillors) and Priory Vale (9 councillors). The council is concerned with the overall economic, cultural and physical well-being of the residents of Greenmeadow, Haydon Wick village, Haydonleigh, Abbey Meads, Haydon End, Taw Hill, Oakhurst, Woodhall Park and West Moredon.

The parish lies within the Borough of Swindon where it is represented by six Borough Councillors for the wards of Haydon Wick and Priory Vale.

== History ==
Prior to 1928, Haydon Wick was part of the parish of Rodbourne Cheney.

Gas was installed in 1930, electricity arrived in 1939 and sewers came after 1928.

Originally a small village, during the latter part of the 20th century and the first decade of the 21st, housebuilding increased the number of properties within the parish considerably. Parts of the parish fall within the Priory Vale northern development. The North Swindon District Centre (or Orbital Shopping Park), which includes a large Asda supermarket, is within the parish.

== Transport ==
Swindon's Bus Company provides the regular local bus service from Haydon Wick into Swindon town.

The Swindon and Cricklade Railway has rebuilt Blunsdon railway station and Hayes Knoll railway station, just outside the parish boundary, and within the parish Taw Valley Halt has been open since 2014. The railway society is currently building a new station at Mouldon Hill.

== Amenities ==
The River Ray flows through the parish; it offers pleasant walks and is home to many species of fish and wildlife.

Known locally as Clifford Meadow, Haydon Meadow is a Site of Special Scientific Interest within the Parish where Anacamptis morio, a rare protected species of Orchid family Orchidaceae may be seen. This flower was adopted as the logo for the Priory Vale development, elements of which lie within the parish.

Mouldon Hill Country Park lies within the parish; the park has a number of paths, a walkway, and a lake. Within it, a new steam railway station is being created by the Swindon and Cricklade Railway.

== Churches ==
Churches within the parish include The Well, St John the Evangelist and Emmanual URC.

== Schools ==
Primary schools within the parish are Catherine Wayte, Greenmeadow, Haydonleigh, Haydon Wick, Orchid Vale Primary, and St. Francis. There is one secondary school, Nova Hreod Academy.
