= Mouldon Hill railway station =

Railway station in Swindon, England

Mouldon Hill

General information
- Location: Mouldon Hill Country Park, Swindon; England
- Coordinates: 51.58971°N 1.83092°W
- System: Station on heritage railway
- Operator: Swindon and Cricklade Railway
Location

Mouldon Hill railway station is the proposed southern terminus of the Swindon and Cricklade Railway, a heritage railway line in England. The station will be situated opposite the River Ray which flows through and within Mouldon Hill Country Park.

| Preceding station | Heritage railways | Following station |
Proposed extension
| Taw Valley Halt towards Hayes Knoll | Swindon & Cricklade Railway | Terminus |
