= Cricklade =

Town in Wiltshire, England

Coordinates: 51.641°N 1.856°W

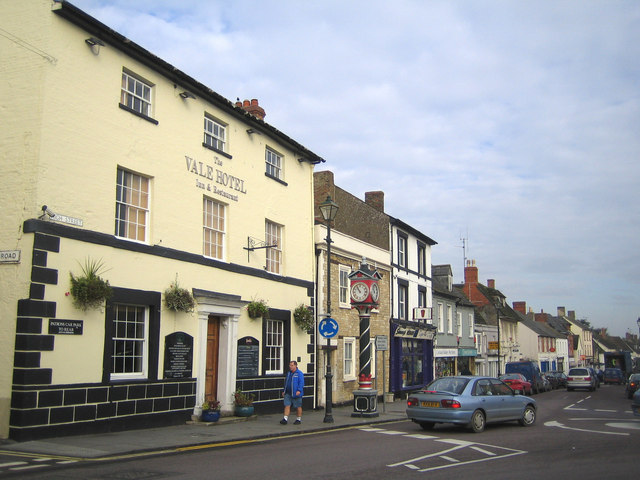
- Jubilee Clock and part of the High Street

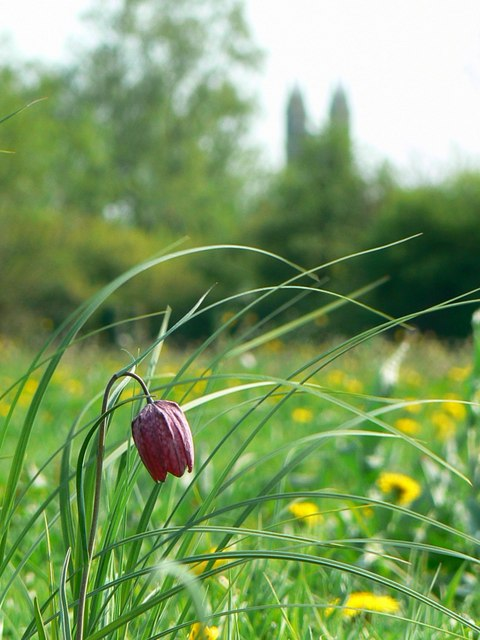
- Snake's head fritillaries in the National Nature Reserve, with the Anglican church behind

- Location within Wiltshire
- Population: 4,253 (2021 Census)
- OS grid reference: SU101936
- Civil parish: Cricklade
- Unitary authority: Wiltshire
- Ceremonial county: Wiltshire
- Region: South West
- Country: England
- Sovereign state: United Kingdom
- Post town: Swindon
- Postcode district: SN6
- Dialling code: 01793
- Police: Wiltshire
- Fire: Dorset and Wiltshire
- Ambulance: South Western
- UK Parliament: South Cotswolds
- Website: crickladetowncouncil.gov.uk

Cricklade is a town and civil parish on the River Thames in north Wiltshire, England, midway between Swindon and Cirencester. It is the northernmost town in Wiltshire. It is the first downstream town on the Thames. The parish population at the 2011 census was 4,227.

== History ==
The name Cricklade is of uncertain origin. The second part of the name derives from the Old English gelād meaning a 'difficult river crossing'. 'Crick' may derive from Primitive Welsh, either crūg meaning 'hill' or creig meaning 'rock'.

Cricklade was founded in the 9th century by the Anglo-Saxons, at the point where the Ermin Way Roman road crossed the River Thames. It was the home of a royal mint from 979 to 1100; there are some Cricklade coins in the town museum. The Domesday Book of 1086 records a settlement at Crichelade, with a church, and at the centre of a hundred of the same name.

=== Anglo-Saxon fortification ===
Cricklade is one of 30 burhs (boroughs, i.e. fortresses or fortified towns) recorded in the Burghal Hidage document, which describes a system of fortresses and fortified towns built around Wessex by King Alfred. Recent research suggests these burhs were built in the short period 878–879 to defend Wessex against the Vikings under Guthrum, and to act as an offensive to the Viking presence in Mercia. Cricklade was an important part of these defences, being a short distance down Ermin Way from Cirencester, where the Vikings made their base for a year. According to the Anglo-Saxon Chronicle, completion of this system precipitated the retreat of the Vikings from Mercia and London to East Anglia in late 879.

The square defences of the fortification have been excavated in several places on all four sides since the 1940s, possibly making them the most extensively sampled fortification of the period. In the initial phase, a walkway of laid stones marked the rear of a bank of stacked turfs and clay which had been dug from three external ditches. In the second phase, the front of the bank, which after only a short time probably became degraded, was replaced by a stone wall. This wall enclosed the defences on all four sides, considerably strengthening the defensive capabilities of the burh. It has recently been suggested the stone wall was inserted in the 890s. Other burhs of the Burghal Hidage were also strengthened with stone walls, which suggests this was part of a systematic upgrade of the defensive provisions for Wessex, ordered by the king.

The third phase is marked by systematic razing of the stone wall, which was pulled down over the inner berm (the space between the wall and the inner ditch). The stones were used to fill the inner two ditches, which shows the process was deliberate. A similar phase can be seen in the archaeological record at Christchurch, Dorset, another burh of the Hidage. Observations at other burhs suggest this phase of destruction was implemented over the whole of Wessex as a concerted policy, again, by inference, on the part of the king. The destruction may be linked to the accession of King Cnut in the early 11th century, to prevent the burhs being seized and used against him by his rivals.

The fourth phase is marked by reuse of the original Anglo-Saxon defences by inserting a timber palisade along the line of the original wall. This probably marks a renewal of the defences of the town during the civil war of 1144 under King Stephen.

There is little archaeological evidence of the community protected by these defences in the Saxon period, although there are signs that streets were laid out in a regular fashion behind the main north–south High Street. A gate in the northern line of the defences led to a causeway over the flood plain of the Thames and a bridge over the river, which was probably of a defensive nature.

=== Other settlements ===
Widhill, south-east of Cricklade beyond the River Ray, had two small estates at the time of Domesday Book and was later a tithing of St Sampson's parish, Cricklade. In 1934 the boundary of Cricklade parish was redrawn along the river, transferring the Widhill area into Blunsdon St Andrew parish (since 2017, St Andrews parish).

Outlying hamlets in Cricklade parish are Calcutt, Chelworth Lower Green, Chelworth Upper Green, Hailstone Hill and Horsey Down.

=== Later history ===
On John Speed's 1611 map of Wiltshire, the town's name is recorded as Crekelade. Cricklade Museum houses several publications recounting further historical details of the town and its people.

The Jubilee Clock, on a cast-iron pillar, stands at a road junction on the High Street. It was erected in 1897 to mark Queen Victoria's Diamond Jubilee.

== Governance ==
The civil parish elects a town council. It is in the area of Wiltshire Council unitary authority, which performs most of the major local-government functions.

There is an electoral ward with the name of Cricklade and Latton, which combines Cricklade parish with its neighbours to the north and north-east – Latton and Marston Maisey – and elects one member of Wiltshire Council. The ward population recorded in the 2011 census was 4,982.

The parish is in the South Cotswolds parliamentary constituency. From 1295 the Cricklade constituency returned two members of parliament. This parliamentary borough represented just the town until 1782, when its boundaries were extended into the surrounding countryside. It later came to include Swindon, then a village. In 1885, Cricklade became a county constituency electing a single member. Cricklade constituency was abolished in 1918, with the town joining the Chippenham constituency, which was renamed to North Wiltshire in 1983; a new South Cotswolds constituency came into effect at the 2024 general election, when the seat was won by Roz Savage for the Liberal Democrats.

== Sport and pastimes ==
=== Rugby Union ===
Cricklade Rugby Club was founded in 1992 by ex-school players from many schools, meeting at the bar of the Vale Hotel, Cricklade, then owned by ex-President and life members the Ross family. Initially players were committed to other clubs, so Sunday fixtures were played, the first one against Aldbourne on 6 September. In its second season the fixtures moved to Saturdays. The club joined the Dorset and Wilts leagues in 1994, but withdrew as the travelling involved was too burdensome. They were able to rejoin in 2001 when the leagues were re-structured into North and South.

The club at first used pitches provided by Prior Park College and the Duke of Gloucester Barracks. Since 2001 it has played on a prepared pitch in the town, leased from the town council. Over the years, Cricklade Rugby Club has toured over England, West and South Wales and Ireland, with teams spanning a broad range of levels of skill and age category.

=== Shows and festivals ===
The Cricklade Show is held each summer, typically featuring music, dancing and a cricket match.

The town holds an annual festival, usually taking place on Father's Day in June.

=== Charity sports ===
Run annually in the first Sunday of October, the Cricklade Fun Run hosts a half marathon, 10 km and Fun Run event for around 750 runners. This raises funds for a number of local charities.

The Cricklade Triathlon runs in the summer for both adults and juniors.

=== Leisure centre ===
Towards the end of 2006, North Wiltshire District Council proposed closing the leisure centre. After a campaign, the local residents took over the running of the centre and were successful in turning its fortunes. It has a swimming pool, sports hall with a range of markings, a bar and lounge area with balcony and barbecue, a skate park, and children's play areas. In 2009, money was raised for a climbing wall.

=== Cricket ===
Cricklade Cricket Club was established in 1877 and has been located since 1947 on the north side of Cricklade, where its ground (Southam) is next to the River Thames. For the 2016 season the club is running two senior Saturday teams, a friendly Sunday team, a midweek team and three youth teams (U15, U13 and U11s), all in the local Cotswold District Cricket Association leagues.

=== Association football ===
Cricklade Town F.C. is a non-League football team which plays at the Cricklade Leisure Centre.

Cricklade Youth Football Club provides and promotes the playing of association football for the youth of Cricklade from U7s to U16s. The club was the first in Wiltshire to gain the Wiltshire FA Charter Standard, an award for clubs across the country that meet the high standards required by the Football Association.

=== Cricklade cinema ===
Since Autumn 2013, Cricklade Town Hall has shown films every 4th Tuesday of the month from September to April. They include recent releases, classics, and non-mainstream films.

== Nature ==
=== North Meadow ===
North Meadow is a large nature reserve which preserves some 80 per cent of Britain's wild snake's head fritillaries in its 150 acres (61 ha). The meadow lies between the Thames and the Churn, which create a unique habitat for the fritillary by winter flooding. Such meadows were once common in Britain, but many were drained and ploughed for arable crops from the 1730s onwards. North Meadow escaped this owing to preservation of its court leet, the Saxon system of town governance that ensured the land was held in common. The site is now managed by Natural England, with support from the court leet.

=== Blakehill ===
In 2000, a disused airfield, formerly RAF Blakehill Farm, was bought from the Ministry of Defence by Wiltshire Wildlife Trust to form a second larger meadow of around 600 acres (240 ha), which opened to the public in 2005. It rears a small quantity of organic grade beef, usually from rare breeds such as English Longhorns.

=== Cotswold Water Park ===
Cricklade lies between the east and west sections of Cotswold Water Park, an extensive nature reserve formed from disused gravel pits.

== Schools ==
=== St Sampson's C of E Primary School ===
The state primary St Sampson's Church of England School was linked with the major local landmark, the Anglican St Sampson's parish church. It was divided in 1979 into two schools on the same Bath Road site: St Sampson's Infants' School, for ages 4–7, and St Sampson's C of E Junior School, for ages 7–11. In 2014, the schools merged again to form St Sampson's C of E (VC) Primary School.

=== Cricklade Manor Preparatory School ===
This private school is non-selective and has around 200 pupils aged 3–13. It is housed in the late 19th-century Manor House, which until 2017 housed a prep school linked to Prior Park College, Bath.

=== Former schools ===
Meadowpark School was an independent school established in 1996 for children aged 4–11, which closed in 2021. It was housed in the former St Mary's School, built in 1860 just south of the Town Bridge.

== Churches ==
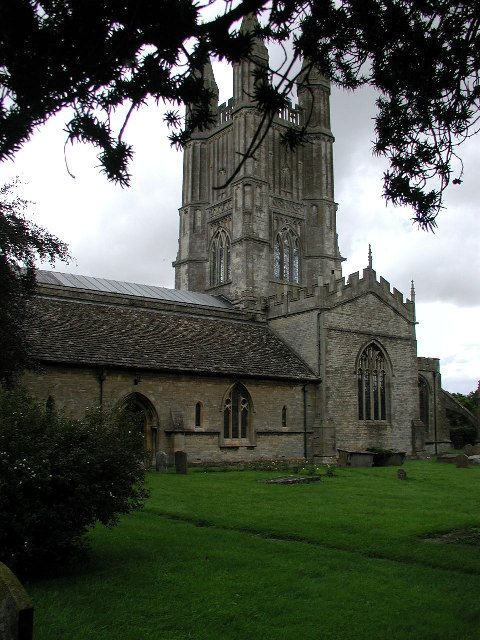
St Sampson's Church

=== Anglican ===
St Sampson's is the town's Church of England parish church. Dating from the 12th century, it is dedicated to the 5th-century Welsh saint, Samson of Dol. The present building rests on the remains of another, Saxon, church of AD 890. The main part was built in 1240–1280, although on close inspection the earlier work can still be seen. The large tower with four corner pinnacles, the dominant landmark of the town, was built in 1551–1553 by John Dudley, 1st Duke of Northumberland, father-in-law to Lady Jane Grey. The church is a Grade I listed building.

=== Roman Catholic ===
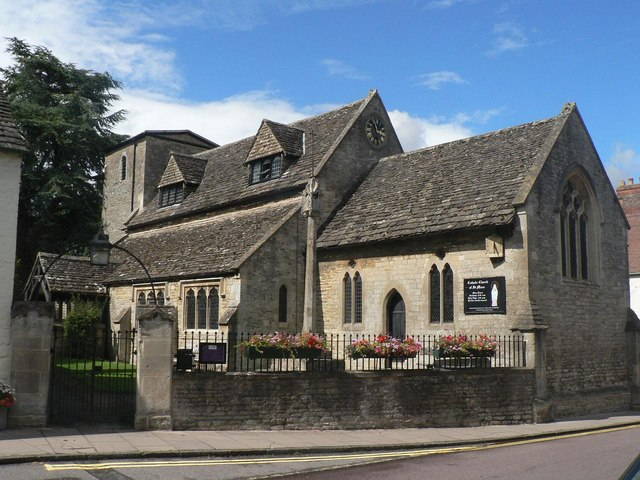
St Mary's Church

Since 1984, St Mary's Church has been leased by the Catholic congregation, after it was declared redundant by the Church of England in 1981. The building is Grade II* listed.

Standing just inside the Saxon town wall, it dates from the 12th century and has a low tower completed about 1400. St Mary's had its own small parish, the northern part of the town and its environs, until 1952, when it was united with St Sampson's.

The churchyard, south of the church, contains a complete 14th-century limestone cross, a Grade I listed structure.

=== United Church ===
Cricklade United Church, Calcutt Street, was built by Congregationalists in 1878, in front of a small meeting house of 1799 which is now the church hall. The congregation joined the United Reformed Church on its formation in 1972 and later merged with Methodists as Cricklade United Reformed and Methodist Church.

=== Former Methodist chapels ===
Primitive Methodists built a hall in Calcutt Street, near the High Street, in 1855, and the Wesleyans built theirs just north of the Town Bridge, near the Priory, in 1870.

In 1938 the two churches united and used the Calcutt Street hall. The Priory building was at first a Sunday school, then after the Second World War was taken over by Wiltshire County Council Education Department, and is now a community hall called Thames Hall. The Calcutt Street building became a doctors' surgery after the move to the United Church.

== Motto, blooms and twinning ==
Cricklade's Latin motto In Loco Delicioso means "in a pleasant place". In 2008 the town was awarded Best Small Town in UK in the Royal Horticultural Society's Britain in Bloom Finals and in 2011 the Champion of Champions award in the Britain in Bloom competition.

Cricklade has been twinned with the French town of Sucé-sur-Erdre since 1990. In June 2010 the 20th anniversary was celebrated in Cricklade. Sucé lies just north of Nantes in the Loire Valley, 30 miles (48 km) from the Atlantic coast. Visits are exchanged in alternate years. Cricklade Twinning Association also holds social events to raise funds towards hosting the visits by Sucé to Cricklade.

== Business and economy ==
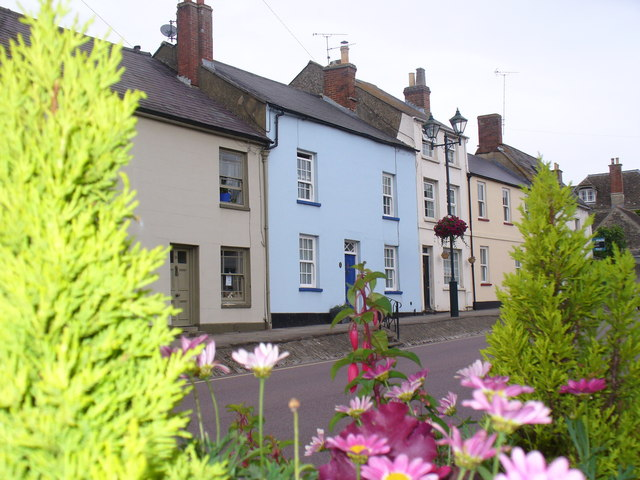
Large Georgian homes in central Cricklade

Cricklade Business Association represents the local business community and has close links with other non-profit organisations, such as the Rotarians, the Waylands Trust, and the charity that runs the leisure centre.

An above-average proportion of the ward population ward was retired at the time of the 2011 census.

There is a local museum in Calcutt Street run by the Cricklade Historical Society, housed in a former Baptist chapel. T. R. Thomson of Costorphine was a long-time resident of Cricklade and a moving spirit behind the establishment of the society. His book Materials for a History of Cricklade and various articles have enhanced the study of local history in the town.

== Media ==
Local news and television programmes are provided by BBC South and BBC West on BBC One, and by ITV Meridian and ITV West Country on ITV1. Television signals can be received from either the Oxford or Mendip TV transmitters.

Local radio stations are BBC Radio Wiltshire on 103.5 FM, Heart West on 97.2 FM, Greatest Hits Radio South West (formerly Sam FM) on 107.7 and Swindon 105.5, a community based radio station, broadcasts from its studios in Swindon on 105.5 FM.

The Swindon Advertiser and Gazette and Herald are the local newspapers that serve the town.

== Notable people ==
In birth date order:

- Robert of Cricklade (c. 1100 – c. 1174–1179) was a teacher and later prominent writer based in Cirencester Abbey and the Priory of St Frideswide, Oxford.
- John Hungerford (c. 1566–1635) was a politician whose interest in Cricklade led him to build the market house in the High Street and a flying buttress for the Lady Chapel of St Sampson's Church.
- Robert Jenner (1584–1651), merchant and politician, founded a school in Cricklade and was buried here.
- Nevil Maskelyne (1611–1679), was a landowner and MP for Cricklade. He gained the town a weekly market and four fairs a year from 1662.
- George R. Poulton (1828-1867), the American composer of the song "Aura Lea", was born here.
- Reginald Arkell (1882–1959), scriptwriter, novelist and humorist, died here.
- Ellis Peters (1913–1995), set her medieval mystery novel Brother Cadfael's Penance in Cricklade.
- Francis Maddison (1927–2006), historian and Arabist, directed archaeological excavations in Cricklade.

== Transport ==
The Thames Path runs through Cricklade then continues downstream on the south bank to Eysey Footbridge, where it crosses to the other bank.

The North Wilts Canal, opened in 1819, passed to the west of the town, linking the Thames and Severn Canal with the Wilts and Berks Canal. Abandoned in the early 20th century, parts are now being restored. The Town Bridge, built in 1812, marks the limits of navigation rights on the River Thames.

Cricklade railway station on the Midland and South Western Junction Railway linked Swindon with Cirencester, but was closed in 1961 and no trace of the station remains. Part of the railway route forms a cycle path (National Cycle Route 45). South of the town, the Swindon and Cricklade Railway is restoring the line as a leisure facility. Since 2007 passenger trains have been run between Blunsdon and Hayes Knoll, and in 2014 the line was extended to Taw Valley Halt on the edge of Swindon. It is also being extended towards Cricklade. The nearest station to Cricklade at present is Hayes Knoll. The nearest mainline railway station is Swindon on the Great Western Main Line.

The A419 Swindon to Cirencester road bypasses the town to the north-east.

Stagecoach West operates the hourly bus route 51 into Cricklade between Swindon and Cirencester.

== See also ==
- Cricklade (UK Parliament constituency) (1295–1918)
