= St Andrews, Swindon =

Civil parish in Swindon, Wiltshire, England

Coordinates: 51.606°N 1.816°W

St Andrews
- St Andrew's churchyard in 2008

- Groundwell Ridge in 2014

- Location within Wiltshire
- Area: 7.962 km^{2} (3.074 sq mi)
- Population: 19,137 (2021 census)
  - Density: 2,404/km^{2} (6,230/sq mi)
- Unitary authority: Borough of Swindon
- Ceremonial county: Wiltshire
- Region: South West
- Country: England
- Sovereign state: United Kingdom
- Post town: Swindon
- Postcode district: SN25
- Dialling code: 01793
- Police: Wiltshire
- Fire: Dorset and Wiltshire
- Ambulance: South Western
- UK Parliament: Swindon North
- Website: www.standrews-pc.gov.uk

St Andrews is a civil parish in Swindon, Wiltshire, England, around 3 1/2 miles (6 km) north-northwest of the town centre. Most of the civil parish is suburban and covers part of north Swindon, although it is centred on the formerly distinct village of Blunsdon St Andrew.

The civil parish was established in April 2017 after Blunsdon St Andrew civil parish was divided into two, with the other half becoming Blunsdon and the A419 acting as the split point.

Suburbs in the civil parish include Abbey Farm, Ash Brake, Eastbury, Groundwell West, Redhouse, St Andrews Ridge and Tadpole Garden Village. In 2021 St Andrews had a population of 19,096.

== History ==
The name Blunsdon derives from the Old English Bluntsdūn meaning 'Blunt's hill'.

Blunsdon St Andrew is recorded in the Domesday Book of 1086 as one of three settlements in the manor of Bluntesdone, in the hundred of Scipa. These settlements lay across Blunsdon Hill on either side of Ermin Way, a Roman road that linked the historic Roman towns of Glevum (Gloucester) and Calleva Atrebatum (Silchester), via Corinium (Cirencester). They were held by three different lords, though the record does not differentiate them further. Bluntesdone had altogether ten households, and a total value of £5 17s in 1086.

Blunsdon St Andrew is mentioned as Bluntesdon Seynt Andreu in 1281 in the county Assize Rolls, and again in 1299 in the Sarum Register.

In 1870 Blunsdon St Andrew was recorded as having a population of 84, in 16 households, and covering 1,422 acres. Its value, together with Broad Blunsdon and Bury Blunsdon, was £5,858.

Blunsdon Abbey was a Gothic mansion built near Blunsdon St Andrew church in 1858–1860 for wealthy sportsman Joseph Clayton de Windt, on the site of an earlier house. It was destroyed by fire in 1904 and remains as a ruin, with parts of the stable block – including a square tower – standing.

Blunsdon Abbey grounds in 2008

St Andrews parish contains two other Domesday manors, Widhill and Groundwell.

=== Widhill ===
Widhill, land lying north of Blunsdon St Andrew as far as the Roman road and bounded to the west by the River Ray, appears in Domesday Book as two estates at Wildehill with altogether 14 households. The area became a tithing of the parish of St Sampson, Cricklade, and for a time a small chapel served the two small settlements at Lower Widhill and Upper Widhill (sometimes North Widhill and West Widhill respectively). Robert Jenner, who prospered as a silver merchant in London, bought Widhill manor in 1624; the Jenner family remained at Widhill until the manor was sold in 1826.

In the late 19th century Widhill became part of Cricklade civil parish, then was transferred to Blunsdon in 1934; its population at the 1931 census had been 21.

Today, Lower Widhill Farm, Chapel Farm and Upper Widhill Farm survive in the strip of farmland between the north edge of Blunsdon St Andrew and the A419.

=== Groundwell ===
Groundwell, lying south of Blunsdon St Andrew and bounded to the east by Ermin Street and to the west and south by Moredon and Rodbourne, is recorded in the Domesday book as a manor of four households and/with a value of £3 10s. It remained as farmland until the northern expansion of Swindon in the mid 20th century. Groundwell Ridge is the site of a Roman rural sanctuary and villa complex, and is a scheduled monument. The site contains traces of domestic buildings from the second to fourth centuries, and earthworks thought to be a formal garden with religious water features.

== Parish Church ==
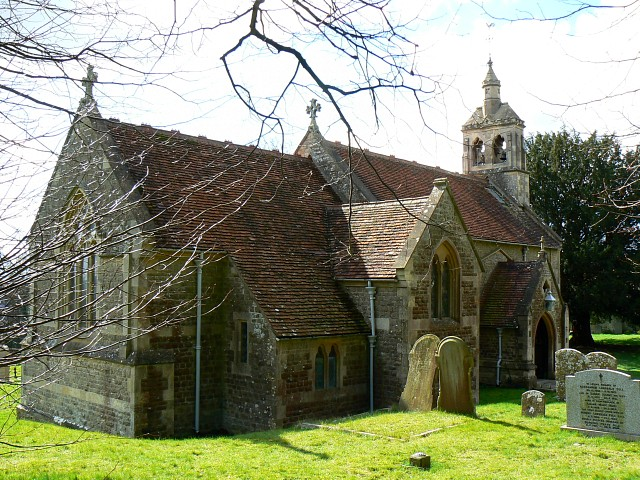
St Andrew's Church in 2008

The parish church of St Andrew is a Grade II* listed building, built in the Early English style with a nave, chancel and an aisle to the south. It has a bell turret with two bells. While parts of the building date from the 13th century, it was largely restored between 1864 and 1868 by architect William Butterfield. Further restoration from September 2009 included the stripping and re-laying of the roof tiles; over 10,000 new handmade clay tiles were used on the south elevation.

== Sport ==
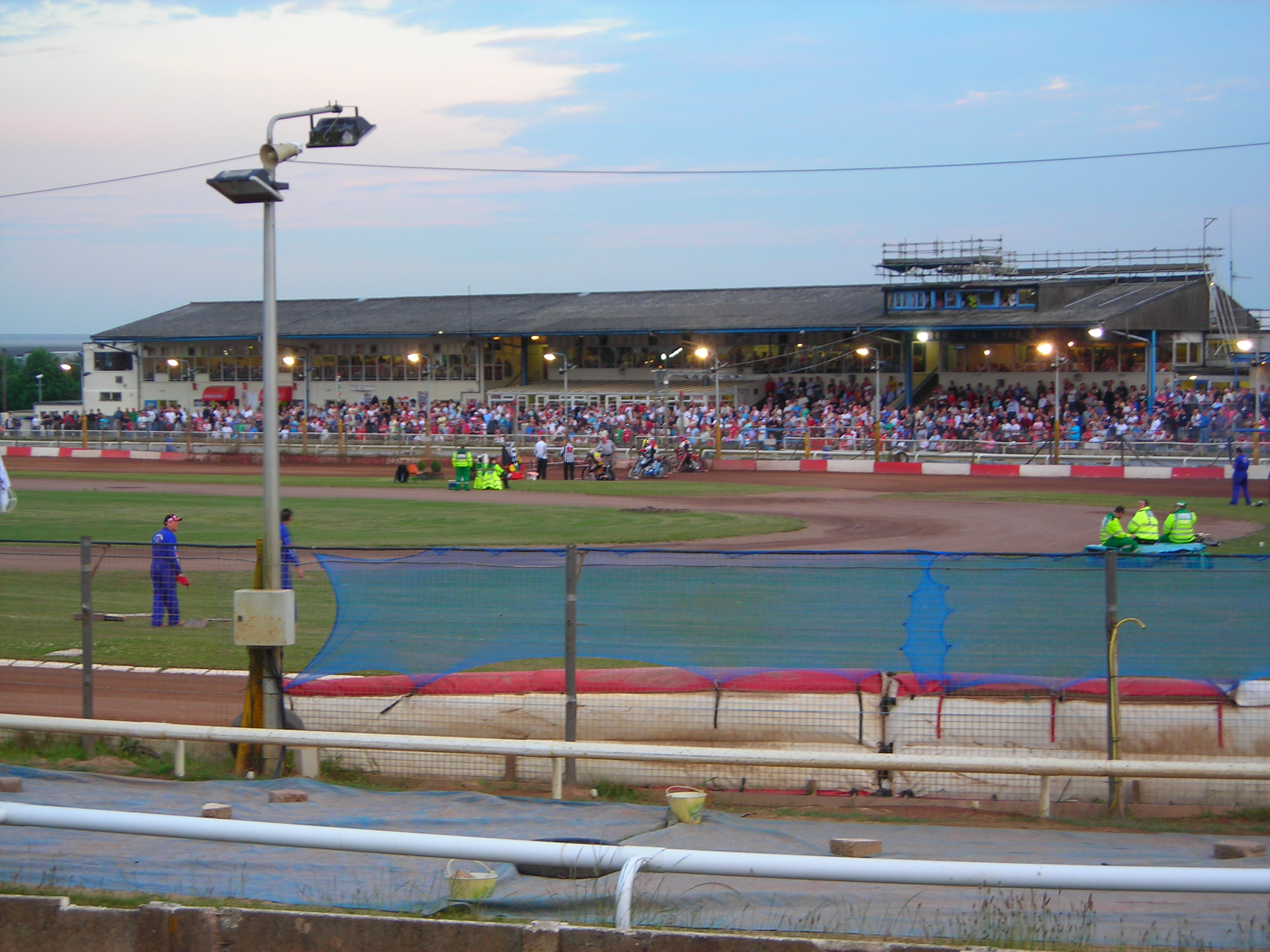
Abbey Stadium in 2009

Abbey Stadium, a greyhound racing and speedway track, lies within in the parish but has not been in operation since 2019 due to long-running uncertainty over redevelopment of the site. Until December 2025, it was the home of Swindon Greyhounds, broadcast three times per week. The stadium was also the home of the Swindon Robins speedway team since it opened in 1949. The Robins competed in national leagues, including the Elite League and the SGB Premiership in the 21st century, but have not raced since 2019.

== Governance ==
The first tier of local government is St Andrews Parish Council. For elections to Swindon Borough Council, the parish is split by the St Andrews East and St Andrews West and Tadpole wards, which elect two councillors each. They replaced the single united St Andrews ward in 2026. For general elections, the parish is part of the Swindon North constituency.

The St Andrews civil parish was formed on 1 April 2017, when the parish of Blunsdon St Andrew was divided in two along the line of the A419 road: the west half became the new parish of St Andrews, and the east half was renamed Blunsdon. At the same time, the boundary with Haydon Wick in the southwest of St Andrews parish was adjusted.

== Transport ==
Blunsdon railway station, which closed to passengers in 1924, sits just outside the parish boundary; however, it has been rejuvenated as part of the Swindon and Cricklade Railway, a heritage line.

== Notable people ==
- Margaret de Windt (1849–1936), daughter of the builder of Blunsdon Abbey, married the White Rajah Charles Brooke and thus became Ranee of Sarawak. Her brother Harry (1856–1933) was an explorer and travel writer.
