= Cricklade railway station =

Former railway station in Wiltshire, England

Cricklade

General information
- Location: Cricklade, Wiltshire; England
- Coordinates: 51.6396°N 1.8609°W
- Grid reference: SU097934
- Platforms: 2

Other information
- Status: Disused

History
- Original company: Swindon and Cheltenham Extension Railway
- Pre-grouping: Midland and South Western Junction Railway
- Post-grouping: Great Western Railway

Key dates
- 18 December 1883: Station opened
- 11 September 1961: Station closed for passengers
- July 1963: closed for goods
Location

Cricklade railway station was on the Midland and South Western Junction Railway in Wiltshire, England. The station opened on 18 December 1883 on the Swindon and Cheltenham Extension Railway line from Swindon Town to the temporary terminus at Cirencester Watermoor. The S&CER line then amalgamated with the Swindon, Marlborough and Andover Railway to form the M&SWJR, and through services to the junction at Andoversford with the Great Western Railway's Cheltenham Lansdown to Banbury line, which had opened in 1881, began in 1891.

Cricklade station was on the southern edge of the town of Cricklade, and was a passing place on the M&SWJR line, which was mostly single track. It was one of the busier stations on the line, with both passengers and freight traffic, and there was a large volume of milk traffic.

As a whole, traffic on the M&SWJR fell steeply after the Second World War and the line closed to passengers in 1961, with goods facilities at Cricklade being withdrawn in July 1963. No trace of the station remains, as link roads around the town now use the rail alignment and land beside the roads has been used for housing.

== Future and preservation ==
The Heritage Swindon and Cricklade Railway aim to extend north to Cricklade, where a new station site would be constructed as part of the S&CR's northern extension.

== Route ==
Disused railways
Cerney and Ashton Keynes; Line and station closed	Midland and South Western Junction Railway; Swindon & Cheltenham Extension Railway	Blunsdon; Line closed; station open
Preceding station	Heritage railways	Following station
Proposed extension
Terminus	Swindon & Cricklade Railway	Hayes Knoll towards Taw Valley Halt
