= South Cerney railway station =

Former railway station in Gloucestershire, England

South Cerney
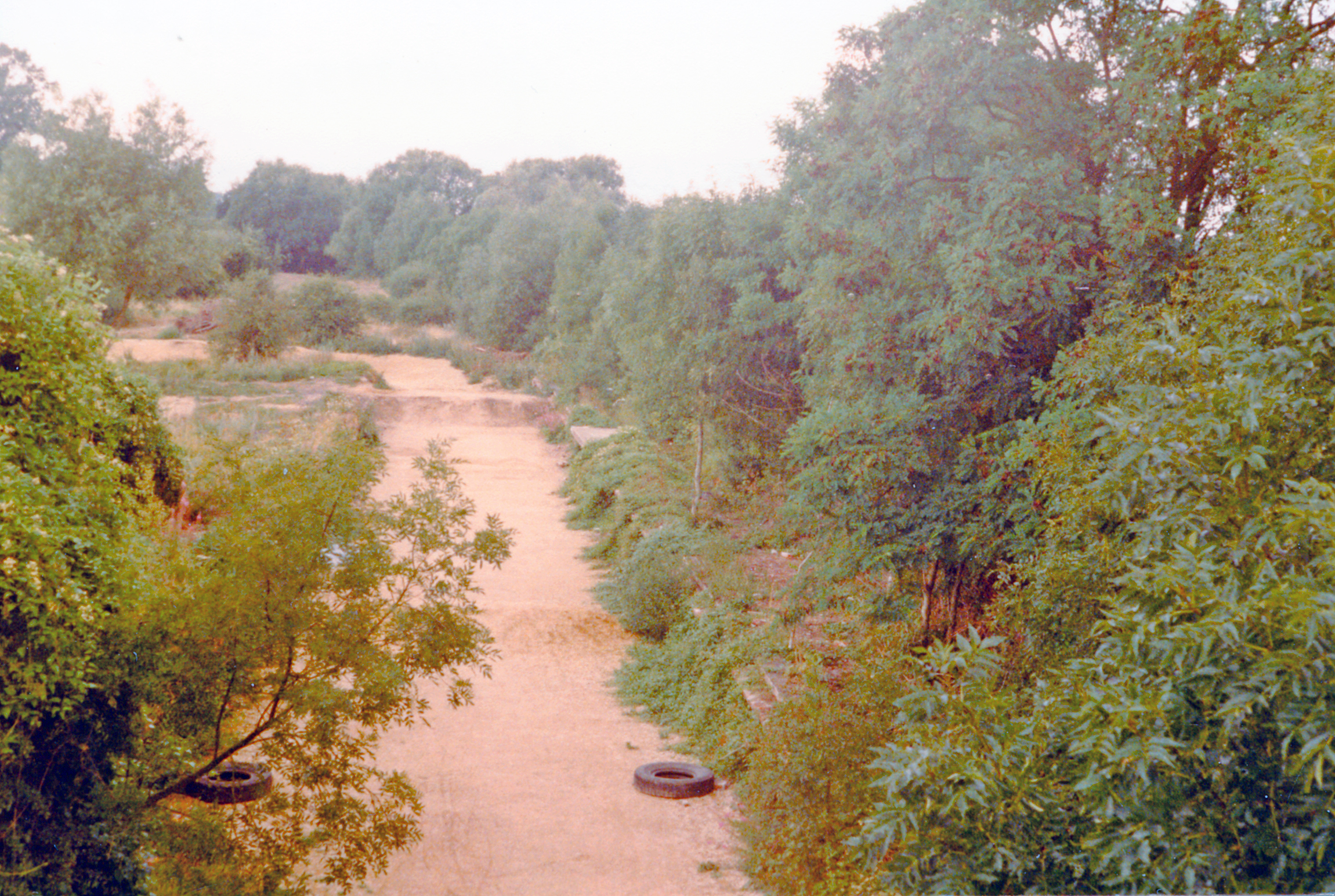
- Site of the station in 1984

General information
- Location: South Cerney, Cotswold; England
- Coordinates: 51.6731°N 1.9190°W
- Grid reference: SU056971
- Platforms: 2

Other information
- Status: Disused

History
- Original company: Swindon and Cheltenham Extension Railway
- Pre-grouping: Midland and South Western Junction Railway
- Post-grouping: Great Western Railway

Key dates
- 18 December 1883: Opened as Cerney and Ashton Keynes
- 1 July 1924: Renamed South Cerney
- 11 September 1961: Station closed for passengers
- July 1963: closed for goods
Location

South Cerney railway station was on the Midland and South Western Junction Railway in Gloucestershire. The station opened on 18 December 1883 on the Swindon and Cheltenham Extension Railway line from Swindon Town to the temporary terminus at Cirencester Watermoor. The S&CER line amalgamated in 1884 with the Swindon, Marlborough and Andover Railway to form the M&SWJR, and through services beyond Cirencester to the junction at Andoversford with the Great Western Railway's Cheltenham Lansdown to Banbury line, which had opened in 1881, started in 1891.

Cerney and Ashton Keynes station was just outside the village of South Cerney and about 2.5 miles north east of Ashton Keynes. In 1905, the Great Western Railway's Minety station on the Swindon to Kemble line was renamed "Minety and Ashton Keynes": it was about the same distance south west of Ashton Keynes.

However, the two stations were not in nominal competition for long. Cerney and Ashton Keynes were renamed as simply "Cerney" after 1910 and then, after the GWR had absorbed the M&SWJR at the Grouping in 1923, as "South Cerney".

Passenger traffic at the station was never high, but there was much goods activity associated with the local gravel pits. As a whole, traffic on the M&SWJR fell steeply after the Second World War and the line closed to passengers in 1961, with goods facilities at South Cerney being withdrawn in July 1963. The only traces of the station remaining are the line of the track through the railway arches and part of the Signal Box in the garden of Ashmoon House. Part of the line remains in use as a cycle path.

== Route ==
Preceding station	Disused railways	Following station
Cirencester Watermoor	Midland and South Western Junction Railway; Swindon & Cheltenham Extension Railway	Cricklade
