= Mouldon Hill Country Park =

Country park in Wiltshire, England

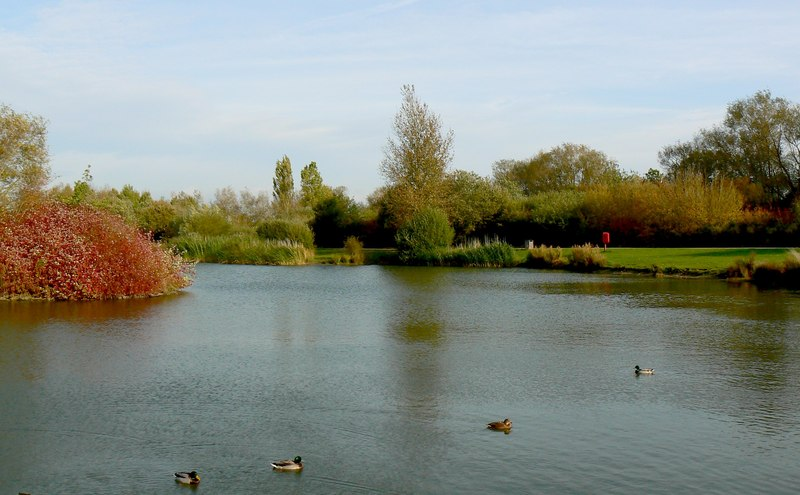

Highest point
- Elevation: 105 m (344 ft)
- Prominence: c. 15 m
- Coordinates: 51°35′23″N 1°49′47″W

Geography
- Location: Wiltshire, England
- OS grid: SU119879

Mouldon Hill Country Park is a country park to the north west of the town centre of Swindon, within the parish of Haydon Wick and close to Thamesdown Drive. It is owned and managed by Swindon Borough Council.

The park is named after the small hill within it that rises from the River Ray and peaks at 105 metres above sea level.

== Attractions ==
The park has a number of paths and walkways together with a hidden lake. A section of the North Wilts Canal flows through the park and has been restored by the Wilts & Berks Canal Trust. The River Ray passes through the park, and is home to many species of fish and wildlife.

There is a 2.1m height restriction entering the park and as of 03/07/20 no gate has been put in.

=== Heritage railway ===
The Swindon and Cricklade Railway, a nearby tourist attraction & heritage line, has a railway station within the park, named Mouldon Hill.
