= Red Post Junction =

Coordinates: 51.2045°N 1.5258°W

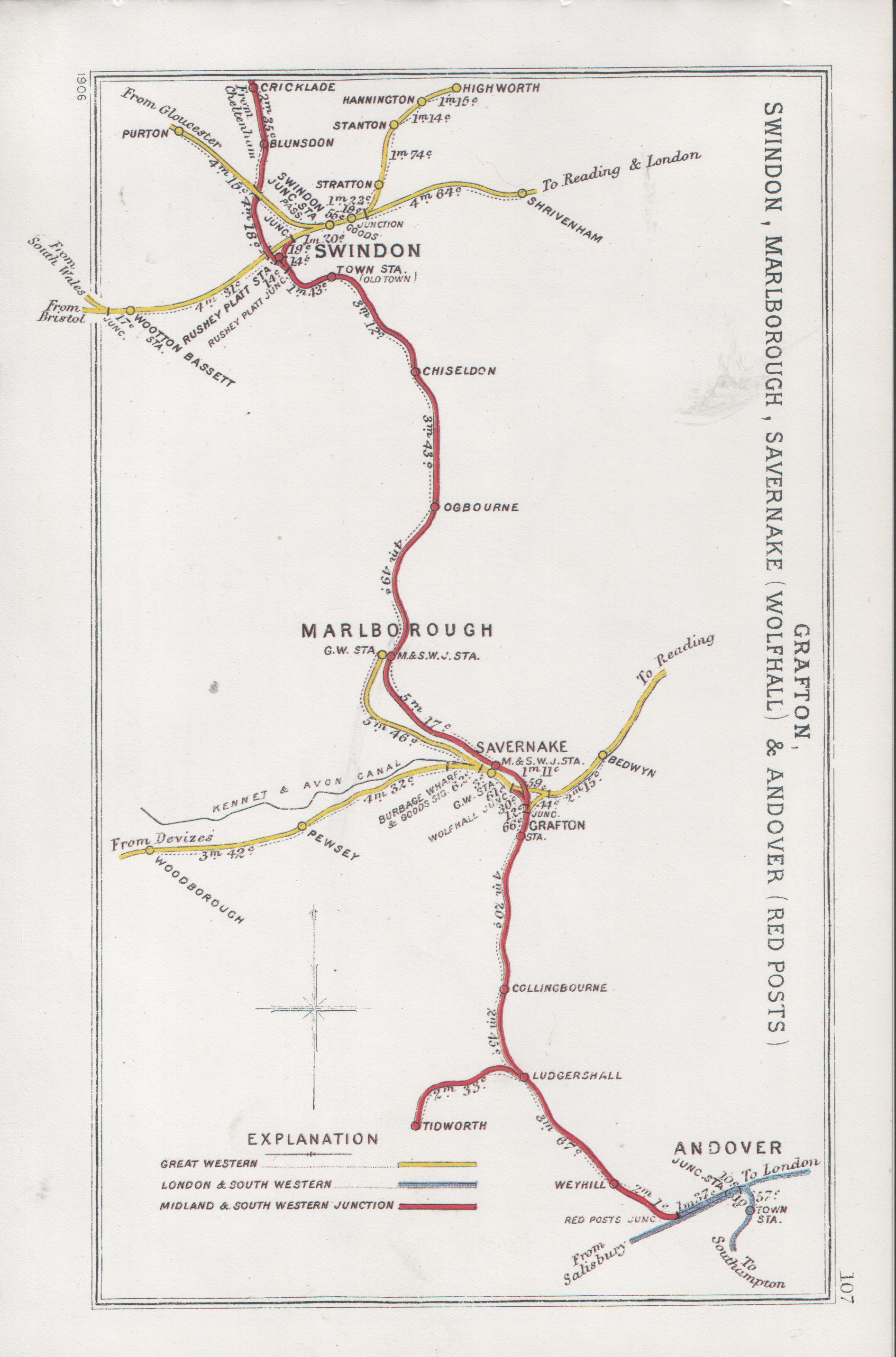
A 1906 Railway Clearing House Junction Diagram showing the southern portion of the Midland and South Western Junction Railway (in red). Red Posts [sic] Junction is at lower right, where that line meets the blue line.

Red Post Junction was a railway junction at Abbotts Ann in Hampshire, England between the former Basingstoke and Salisbury Railway and Midland and South Western Junction Railway. The junction was removed after the final closure of the M&SWJR in 1961.

== History ==
In 1873, two railway lengths were authorized which included the Red Post Junction (formerly known as the Andover Junction Station). The Red Post Junction served the Andover area.

== Remains ==
Although the physical junction was removed, there is a stub of the M&SWJR remaining to serve military installations at Ludgershall. This stub is connected to a goods line from Andover which runs alongside the main line until the tracks diverge at the site of Red Post Junction.
