= GWR No. 1334 =

Class of British steam locomotives

GWR No. 1334, 1335, 1336
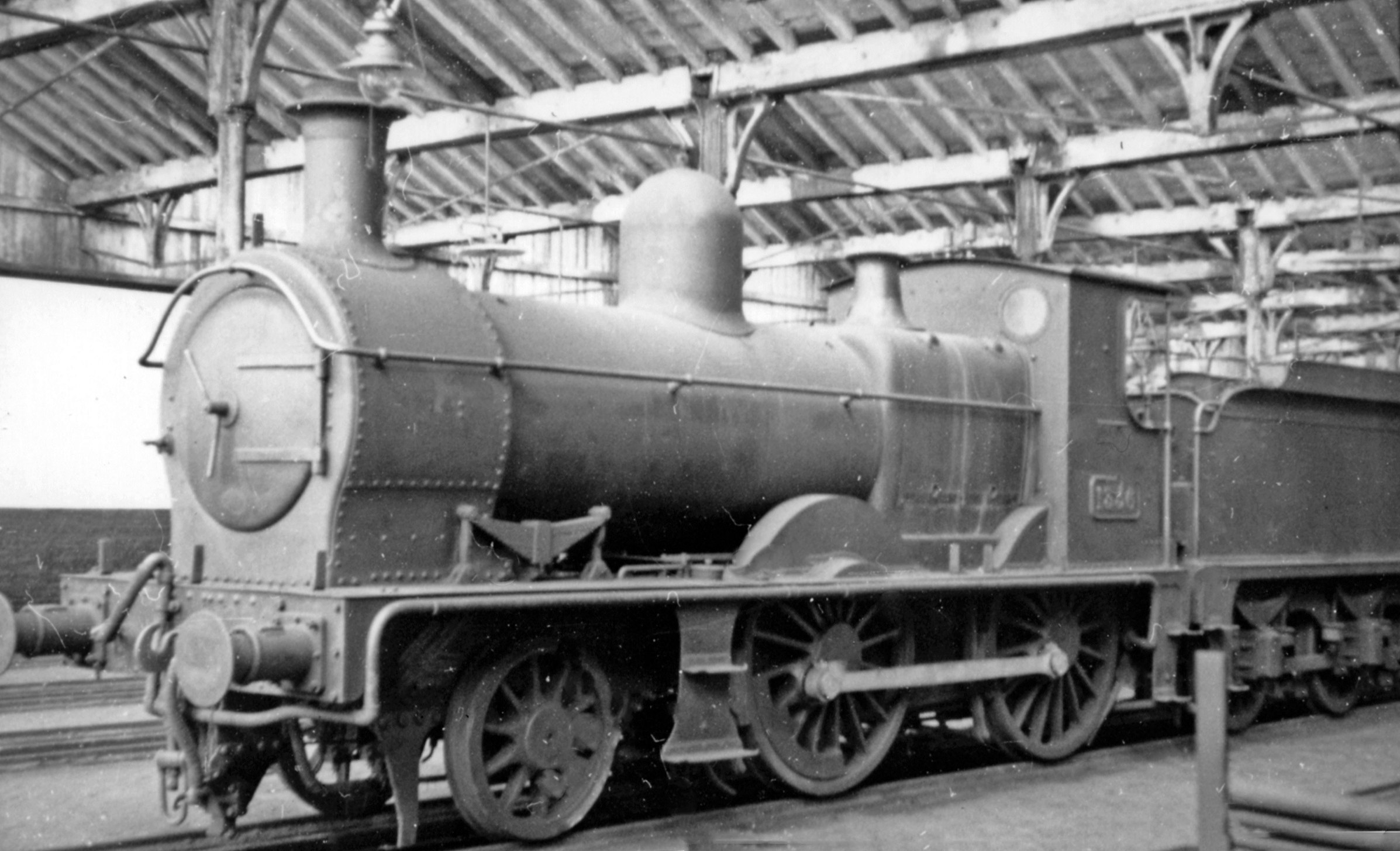
Type and origin
- Power type: Steam
- Designer: Dübs and Company
- Builder: Dübs and Company
- Build date: 1894
- Total produced: 3
Specifications
- Configuration
  - Whyte: 2-4-0
- Gauge: 4 ft 8 1/2 in (1,435 mm) standard gauge
- Driver dia.: 5 ft 6 in (2 m)
- Loco weight: 35.25 long tons (39.48 short tons; 35.82 t)
- Tender weight: 30.1 long tons (33.7 short tons; 30.6 t)
- Fuel type: Coal
- Boiler pressure: 165 psi (1,140 kPa)
- Cylinders: two inside
- Cylinder size: 17 in × 24 in (432 mm × 610 mm)
Performance figures
- Tractive effort: 13,400 lbf (60 kN)
Career
- Power class: BR: 1MT
- Numbers: 1334, 1335, 1336
- Disposition: All scrapped

GWR No. 1334, and sister locomotives 1335 and 1336, were 2-4-0 steam locomotives which the Great Western Railway inherited from the Midland and South Western Junction Railway.

== History ==
The locomotives had been numbered 10, 11 and 12 by the M&SWJR. They were re-boilered by the GWR and they were the only M&SWJR locomotives to survive into British Railways ownership in 1948.

== Withdrawal ==
The locomotives were withdrawn as follows. None were preserved.

Number	Shed code	Date withdrawn
1334	81E Didcot	30 September 1952
1335	81D Reading	30 September 1952
1336	81D Reading	31 March 1954

== Modelling ==
A 4 mm scale kit is available from Nu-Cast
