= Taw Valley Halt railway station =

Railway station in Wiltshire, England

Taw Valley Halt
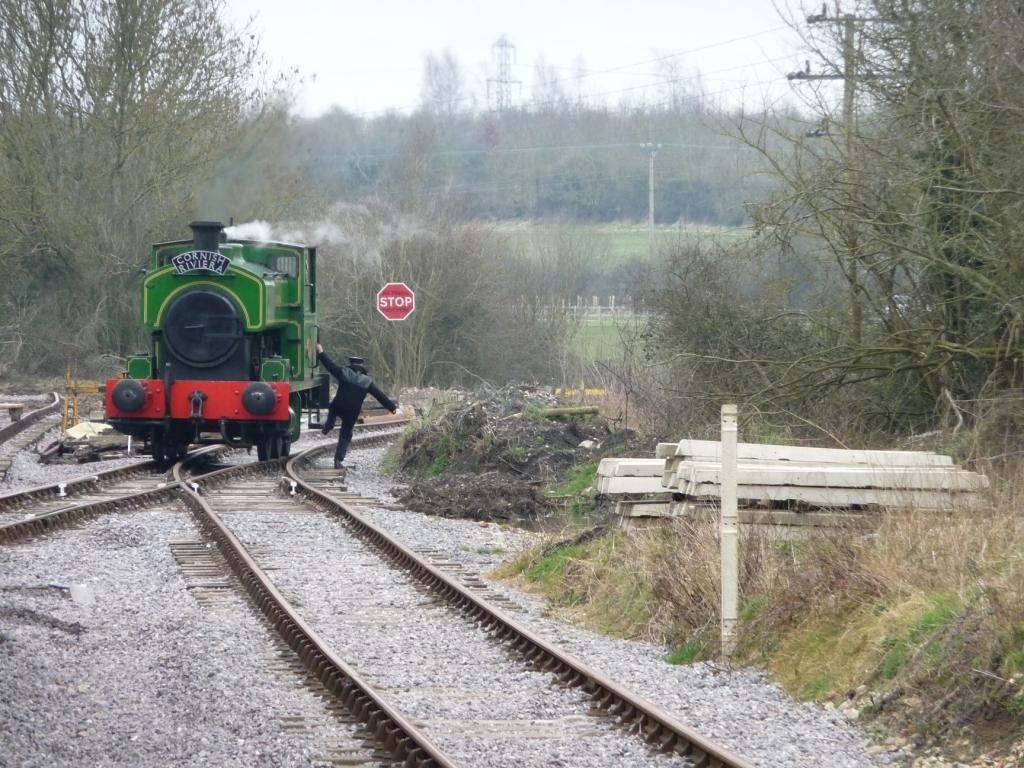

General information
- Location: Haydon Wick, Swindon; England
- Coordinates: 51.5916°N 1.8290°W
- Grid reference: SU118880
- System: Station on heritage railway
- Operator: Swindon and Cricklade Railway
- Platforms: 1

Key dates
- 2014: Opened
Location

Taw Valley Halt railway station is the current (and temporary) southern terminus of the Swindon and Cricklade Railway, a heritage railway line in Wiltshire, South-West England. The restored line was extended to the site of the halt in 2012, and the halt was opened in 2014. The halt is at the point where the new track diverges from the original route of the Midland and South Western Junction Railway. There is a short siding on the original trackbed.

The halt is close to Mouldon Hill Country Park on the northwest outskirts of Swindon. Plans call for the line to be continued south to a new terminus at Mouldon Hill, within the park.

Preceding station	Heritage railways	Following station
Blunsdon towards Hayes Knoll	Swindon & Cricklade Railway	Terminus
Proposed extension
Blunsdon towards Hayes Knoll	Swindon & Cricklade Railway	Mouldon Hill Terminus
