= Hayes Knoll railway station =

Railway station in Wiltshire, England

Hayes Knoll
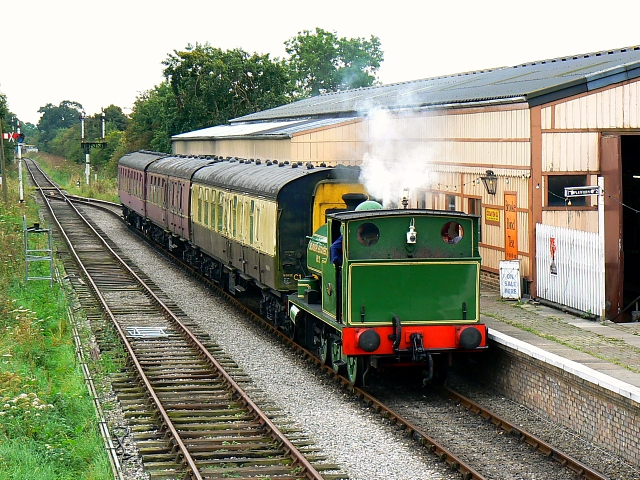
- Hayes Knoll railway station

General information
- Location: Wiltshire; England
- Coordinates: 51.61348°N 1.84692°W
- Grid reference: SU106905
- System: Station on heritage railway
- Manager: Swindon and Cricklade Railway
- Platforms: 1

Key dates
- December 1999: Opened
Location

Hayes Knoll railway station is found on the heritage Swindon and Cricklade Railway in Wiltshire, England.

Hayes Knoll station was built in 1999 as part of the work to reopen the section of the former Midland and South Western Junction Railway line between Swindon and Cricklade, the entire route having been closed in 1961. It is just east of Hayes Knoll hamlet in Purton parish, about 1,000 yards (900 m) north of the rebuilt Blunsdon station and 4 1/2 miles (7 km) north-west of the centre of Swindon.

The station has one platform, an engineering workshop and locomotive shed, at a place where the original railway trackbed includes an additional piece of land in railway ownership. It thus provides an initial destination for trains from Blunsdon, and engineering facilities required to operate the railway. There is no public access to Hayes Knoll station except by train.

The locomotive depot has five 'roads' that are accessed by means of a headshunt to the north of the depot, where Hayes Oak sidings are. The second road is primarily for the use of steam locomotives and has two inspection pits (one indoors, one outdoors), a watering column and areas to drop ash, store tools and keep wood. The other roads are for the use of both carriages and locomotives. The roads outside the depot building are mainly for storage of wagons required to run the depot such as wagon mounted water and diesel tanks, the septic tank for the toilets, coal wagons and other items of rolling stock necessary to keep the depot functioning.

Preceding station	Heritage railways	Following station
Terminus	Swindon & Cricklade Railway	Blunsdon towards Taw Valley Halt
Proposed extension
Cricklade Terminus	Swindon & Cricklade Railway	Blunsdon towards Taw Valley Halt
