= Blunsdon railway station =

Railway station in Wiltshire, England

Blunsdon
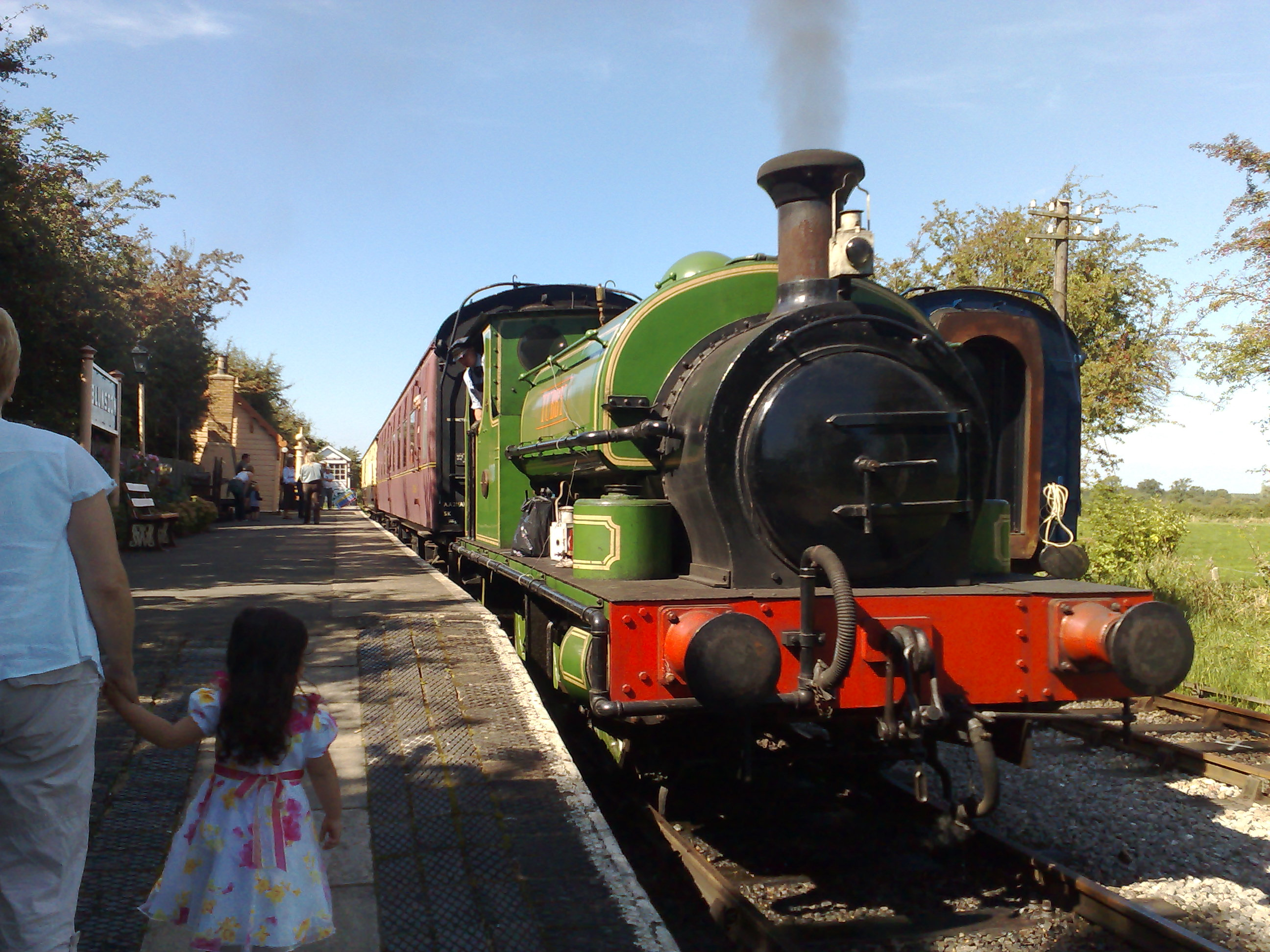
- Hudswell Clarke saddle tank Tubby at Blunsdon

General information
- Location: Tadpole Lane, Swindon SN25 2DA; Wiltshire; England
- Coordinates: 51.60702°N 1.84362°W
- Grid reference: SU109897
- System: Station on heritage railway
- Platforms: 1

History
- Original company: Swindon and Cheltenham Extension Railway
- Pre-grouping: Midland and South Western Junction Railway
- Post-grouping: Great Western Railway

Key dates
- 1 September 1895: opened
- 22 September 1924: closed for passengers
- 1 August 1937: closed for goods
Location

Blunsdon railway station is a station on the Swindon and Cricklade Railway, a heritage line in Wiltshire, England. The first station on the site was built in 1895 to serve the villages of Blunsdon St Andrew and Broad Blunsdon, north of Swindon, and closed in 1937.

== History ==
Blunsdon was one of the last stations to be opened by the Midland and South Western Junction Railway in 1895, on a line that had opened in 1883.

Its site was in Purton parish, next to the overbridge carrying a lane between Purton and the villages of Blunsdon St Andrew and Broad Blunsdon. It was little more than a single-platform halt, and milk was the main traffic. It had a short curved siding, used for such traffic as fertiliser and other agricultural goods. The platform was south of the bridge, while the siding and goods yard were to the north.

The station was also one of the first on the line to be closed. Regular passenger trains stopped calling in 1922, leaving one passenger train service stopping at Blunsdon on a Sunday until 1924. The station closed completely on 1 August 1937 when goods traffic ceased.

== Heritage railway ==
The site became the headquarters of the Swindon and Cricklade Railway in the late 1970s because it offered the best road access to the trackbed between Swindon and Cricklade. By that time, almost every trace of the original station had gone, and the present structures – several of them relocated from other closed railways – are all new.

Blunsdon station offers attractions including the Swindon and Cricklade railway shop, cafe, toilets and car parking.

== Route ==
Preceding station	Heritage railways	Following station
Hayes Knoll Terminus	Swindon & Cricklade Railway	Taw Valley Halt Terminus
Disused railways
Cricklade	Midland and South Western Junction Railway; Swindon & Cheltenham Extension Railway	Moredon Halt
