= Midland and South Western Junction Railway =

Transport company

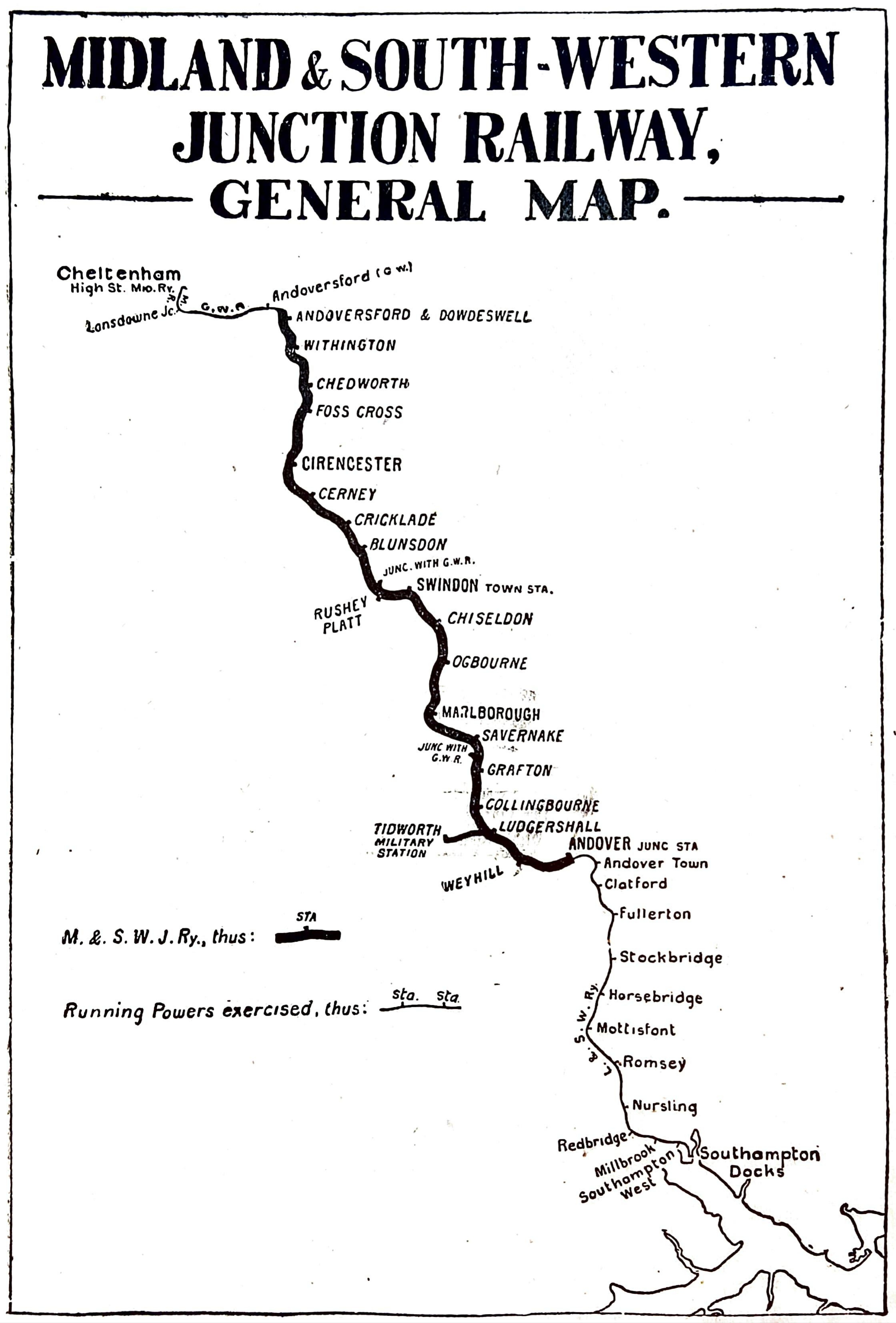
- 1920 map of the railway

Overview
- Status: Disused
- Termini: Cheltenham Spa; Andover

Service
- Type: Heavy rail
- Operator(s): Midland and South Western Junction Railway; Great Western Railway; British Railways

History
- Opened: 1884–1891
- Closed: Passengers 1961; Goods 1964–1970

Technical
- Line length: 63 miles 75 chains (102.9 km) (1919)
- Track length: 118 miles 63 chains (191.2 km) (1919)
- Track gauge: 4 ft 8 1/2 in (1,435 mm) standard gauge

The Midland and South Western Junction Railway (M&SWJR) was an independent railway built to form a north–south link between the Midland Railway and the London and South Western Railway in England, allowing the Midland and other companies' trains to reach the port of Southampton. The M&SWJR was formed in 1884 from the amalgamation of the Swindon, Marlborough and Andover Railway and the Swindon and Cheltenham Extension Railway. The line was absorbed by the Great Western Railway at the 1923 grouping of the railways, and became part of British Railways on nationalisation in 1948. The railway closed to passengers in 1961, and to goods between 1964 and 1970. A small part of it has been reopened as the heritage Swindon and Cricklade Railway.

== First proposals ==
By 1845 the Great Western Railway (GWR) had established itself as the dominant railway company controlling west to east trunk routes from Bristol and the West of England to London. The GWR was a 7 ft 1/4 in (2,140 mm) broad gauge railway and it sought to monopolise the area it occupied, excluding competing railways. A number of schemes had been proposed to build a north-south railway route, particularly one connecting the manufacturing districts of the West Midlands and Lancashire to Southampton and the Channel Ports. Such a railway would inevitably cut through the territory – at first simply occupied by the west to east Bristol line – which the GWR considered to be its own.

As early as 1846 a Manchester and Southampton Railway was proposed; it would have been 88 miles (142 km) long, running from north of Cheltenham to Southampton, passing to the east of Swindon and near Marlborough. It would have cost £1.5 million to build. It was defeated in the House of Lords by a narrow margin after the GWR had given an undertaking to lay narrow gauge rails on its line between Oxford and Basingstoke, facilitating north-south connections by that route.

The ambition of an independent through railway from north to south was eventually reduced to serving local communities, and the first line on the corridor envisaged was the Andover and Redbridge Railway, which was incorporated on 12 July 1858. Redbridge was on the London and South Western Railway (LSWR) a short distance west of Southampton, an important port. The LSWR quickly acquired the young company (in 1863) and opened the line on 6 March 1865.

== A broad gauge line at Marlborough ==
The Berks and Hants Extension Railway (B&HER), an extension of the earlier Berks and Hants Railway, opened on 11 November 1862. A member of the GWR family of railways, it was built on the 7 ft 1/4 in (2,140 mm) broad gauge and ran broadly west to east between Devizes and Hungerford, passing south of the important market town of Marlborough and forming another barrier to north-south connections.

During construction, Marlborough businessmen promoted an independent branch line from the B&HER, and it was authorised by the Marlborough Railway Act 1861 (24 & 25 Vict. c. clxvii) on 22 July 1861; it was to be called the Marlborough Railway and form a junction with the B&HER at Savernake. The line opened on 15 April 1864. Trains departed from a new platform at Savernake, to make the journey of 5 miles 49 chains (9.03 km) to a station which later became Marlborough High Level, with no intermediate stations.

This line too was worked by the GWR, and the B&HER and the Marlborough Railway were absorbed by the Great Western Railway in 1886; the Marlborough Railway was purchased for £9,250 in cash. Both lines were converted to 4 ft 8 1/2 in (1,435 mm) standard gauge in 1874.

== Swindon, Marlborough and Andover Railway ==
=== Early efforts ===
Swindon, Marlborough, and Andover Railway Act 1873
- Act of Parliament
- Parliament of the United Kingdom
- Long title: An Act for making a Railway from the Great Western Railway at Swindon to the London and South-western Railway at Andover; and for other purposes.
- Citation: 36 & 37 Vict. c. cxciv

Dates
- Royal assent: 21 July 1873

Text of statute as originally enacted

Business interests at Swindon and Marlborough pressed to promote a north-south connection, and a Swindon, Marlborough, Southampton and New Forest Railway was promoted, soon renamed the Swindon, Marlborough and Andover Railway (SM&AR). With considerable support at Marlborough and from the LSWR, and perhaps surprising support from the Marlborough Railway and the GWR, the Swindon, Marlborough, and Andover Railway Act 1873 (36 & 37 Vict. c. cxciv) which authorised the scheme received royal assent on 21 July 1873, with share capital of £375,000 and borrowing powers of £125,000. The Marlborough Railway was authorised to subscribe up to £25,000 in addition, and improvements to their railway could be carried out.

The line was to start a short distance east of the GWR Swindon station, curving sharply to the south and passing through a 773-yard (707 m) tunnel south of Hunt Street, and run to a joint Marlborough station, possibly an enlargement of the existing station; there would be an end-on connection with the Marlborough Railway. Running powers were granted over the Marlborough Railway and a short distance of the adjacent main line of the Berks and Hants Extension Railway, from Savernake to Wolfhall Junction. From the junction a second section of the SM&AR was to run southwards to join the London and South Western Railway (LSWR) at Andover. The final section to Andover was to run adjacent to the LSWR main line, but a connection to it there at the point of geographical junction was prohibited. (Note: The location was called Abbots Ann, later Red Post or sometimes Red Posts.) The LSWR was to build the third line over that section, and lease it to the SM&AR.

Swindon, Marlborough, and Andover Railway Act 1878
- Act of Parliament
- Parliament of the United Kingdom
- Long title: An Act to extend the time granted to the Swindon, Marlborough, and Andover Railway Company for the completion of certain railways and works; and for other purposes.
- Citation: 41 & 42 Vict. c. xiii

Dates
- Royal assent: 16 April 1878

Text of statute as originally enacted

When tenders for the construction were invited at the end of 1874, only one was received, for £350,390 11s 0d. Efforts were made to obtain competing tenders, and eventually a contract was let to William Wright on 25 June 1875. However faulty work in the tunnel at Swindon soon led to a collapse of the workings there, and shortly to the failure of the contractor in December 1875. The company continued work directly but ran out of money and work ceased in October 1876. It seemed that the scheme was to be abandoned, but authority for an extension of time was obtained in the Swindon, Marlborough, and Andover Railway Act 1878 (41 & 42 Vict. c. xiii) in July 1878

=== Swindon to Marlborough ===
Swindon, Marlborough, and Andover Railway Act 1879
- Act of Parliament
- Parliament of the United Kingdom
- Long title: An Act for enabling the Swindon, Marlborough, and Andover Railway Company to construct new or deviation Lines of Railway; to abandon certain portions of their authorised Railway; and for other purposes.
- Citation: 42 & 43 Vict. c. xci

Dates
- Royal assent: 3 July 1879

Text of statute as originally enacted

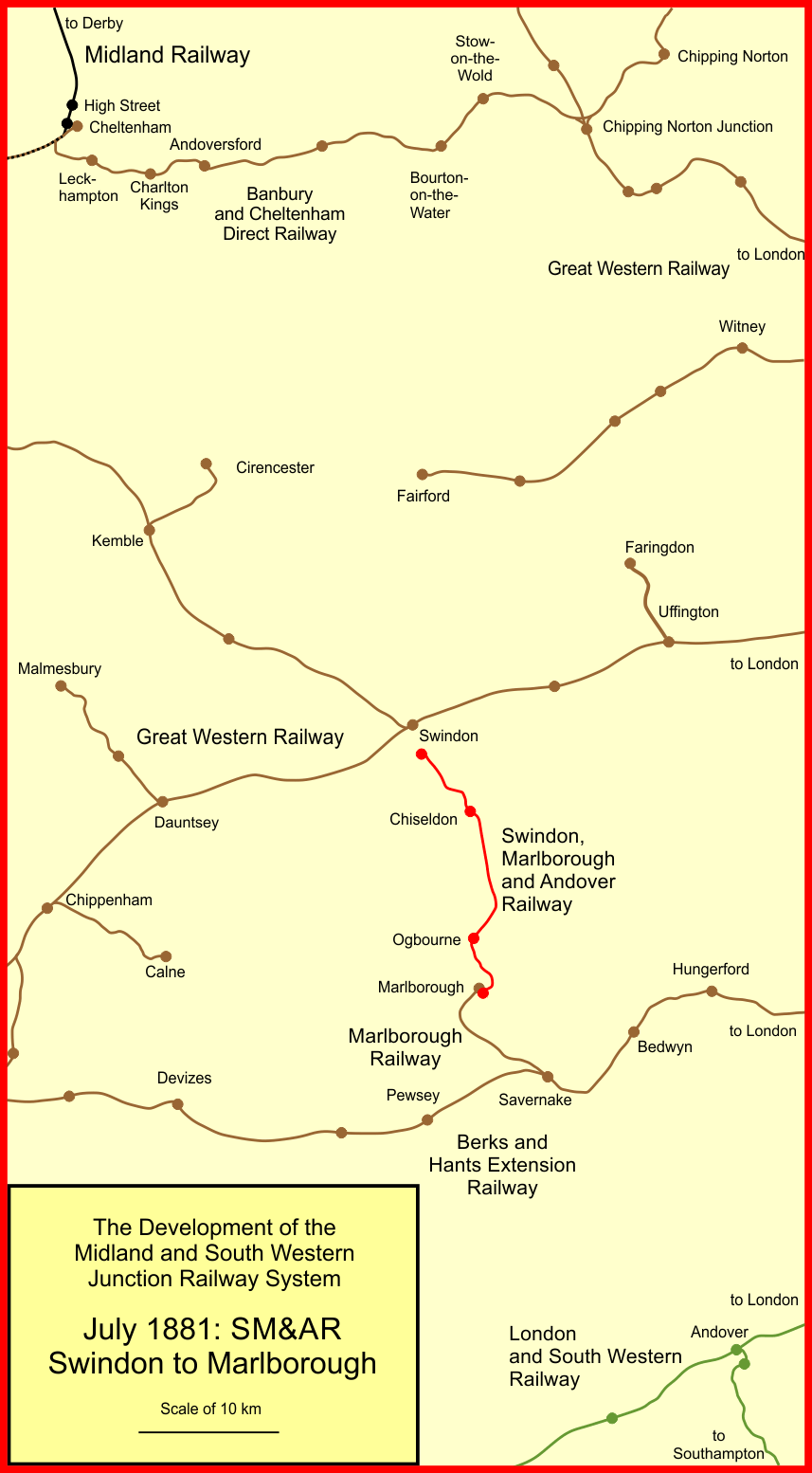
Swindon and Marlborough in 1881

The company realised that there was no hope of raising the necessary capital to continue, and planned an altered route with easier engineering. Deviations were authorised by the Swindon, Marlborough, and Andover Railway Act 1879 (42 & 43 Vict. c. xci) on 3 July 1879; these reduced the earthworks and avoided the Swindon tunnel, at the expense of more and steeper gradients. The route southwards from Swindon was now to curve round the west of the hill on which the Old Town stands, leaving the GWR main line at Rushey Platt, west of the Swindon GWR station. There was also a deviation at Marlborough to avoid the need for a viaduct, but this had the effect of bringing the line into the Marlborough Railway somewhat south of its station, so that the SM&AR had to provide its own station there, duplicating the Marlborough Railway station. The deviations amounted to about 8 miles (13 km) out of the 12 1/2 miles (20 km) between Swindon and Marlborough.

Swindon, Marlborough and Andover Railway Act 1880
- Act of Parliament
- Parliament of the United Kingdom
- Long title: An Act for granting further powers to the Swindon, Marlborough, and Andover Railway Company.
- Citation: 43 & 44 Vict. c. xviii

Dates
- Royal assent: 29 June 1880

Text of statute as originally enacted

In September 1879 work was resumed by Watson, Smith & Watson "on terms guaranteeing interest payments to shareholders at 5 per cent per annum until the line was open for traffic". That firm's financial strength was considered controversial, and it is not clear how the contractor was to be remunerated, but preference dividends were authorised by an act of Parliament, the Swindon, Marlborough and Andover Railway Act 1880 (43 & 44 Vict. c. xviii), on 29 June 1880. Construction now proceeded more rapidly, and the section from Swindon (SM&AR station, later Swindon Town) to Marlborough (SM&A station) was opened formally on 26 July 1881 and to the public on 27 July 1881. There were intermediate stations at Chiseldon and Ogbourne.

An accident occurred on 11 July 1881 under trial running conditions at Chiseldon, when a guard slipped from the footboard of a train and his foot was crushed by the wheel of his train.

No terms for access to Swindon GWR station had been set, and the company now negotiated with the GWR; the GWR was hostile, seeing the SM&AR as facilitating a potential north–south penetrating route, and the terms went to arbitration; this awarded considerably reduced charges compared with the GWR's initial demands: £3,900 per annum for the use of Swindon GWR station, plus other charges. A passenger service between the SM&AR and GWR stations at Swindon was started by the SM&AR on 6 February 1882.

=== Marlborough to Andover ===
Construction of the line south of Savernake was making good progress and on 21 March 1882 Major Marindin inspected the line for opening. The new SM&AR works were found to be satisfactory, but of course opening the line throughout required running from Marlborough to Savernake over the Marlborough Railway. It had opened in 1864 as a single line 7 ft 1/4 in (2,140 mm) broad gauge branch. Never intended as a through line, it was steeply graded and sharply curved, and worked by wooden train staff and ticket, on the time interval system without block telegraph. At Savernake it joined the Berks and Hants Extension Railway, which was itself a single line, and the Savernake station had "only one through platform and very rudimentary signalling equipment". Passenger trains crossed there by reversing from the platform into the loop. Marindin said it was "not fit for the existing traffic, and still less for the additional traffic that would pass through it upon the opening of the additional lines".

Swindon, Marlborough and Andover Railway Act 1882
- Act of Parliament
- Parliament of the United Kingdom
- Long title: An Act for granting further powers to the Swindon Marlborough and Andover Railway Company, and for other purposes.
- Citation: 45 & 46 Vict. c. cxcv

Dates
- Royal assent: 10 August 1882

Text of statute as originally enacted

Swindon Marlborough and Andover Railway Act 1883
- Act of Parliament
- Parliament of the United Kingdom
- Long title: An Act for granting further Powers to the Swindon Marlborough and Andover Railway Company; and for other purposes.
- Citation: 46 & 47 Vict. c. cxxi

Dates
- Royal assent: 16 July 1883

The SM&AR was therefore refused permission to open until the GWR (effectively the managing company for the B&HER and the Marlborough Railway) improved the arrangements at Savernake, in particular providing interlocking and the signalling system on the branch. This required an enabling act, the Swindon, Marlborough and Andover Railway Act 1882 (45 & 46 Vict. c. cxcv).

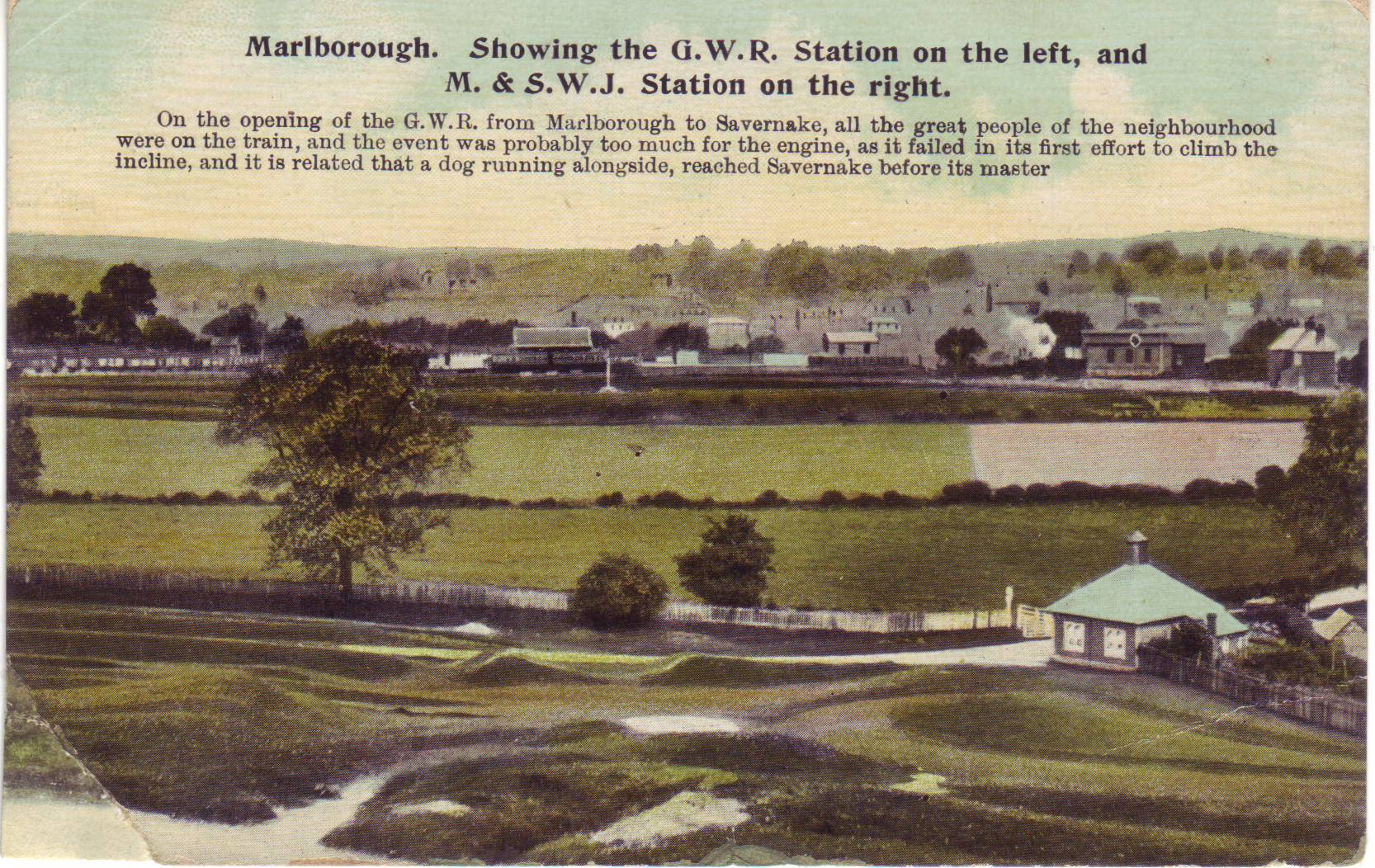
Marlborough railway stations from an old postcard

At this time the southern section of the SM&AR was ready, and the company had engaged and trained staff to work the line, so it started a train service from its Grafton station to Andover, beginning on 1 May 1882 and using a temporary connection at the point of geographical junction near Andover (later to be called Red Post Junction). Permanent use of such a connection was prohibited, and the third track from there to Andover, for the use of SM&AR trains, came into use on 20 November 1882. Intermediate stations were at Collingbourne, Ludgershall and Weyhill.

The GWR was not hastening to make the Marlborough line ready for the intruder, and the financial responsibility for the improvement works went to arbitration; meanwhile the officials of the SM&AR, responsible for two separated sections of railway, had to acquire a horse and trap for managerial visits to their line. The works were finalised on 30 January 1883, so finally the SM&AR was able to operate throughout from Swindon to Andover, from 5 February 1883. Its own route ran from Rushey Platt (near Swindon) to Marlborough Junction (13 miles 47 chains, 21.87 km) and Wolfhall Junction (east of Savernake on the B&HER) to Red Post Junction (west of Andover, 14 miles 1 chain, 22.55 km). All was single track except the connecting curve at Rushey Platt and a short section at Marlborough. The capital expenditure had been over £600,000.

== Swindon and Cheltenham Extension Railway ==
Swindon and Cheltenham Extension Railway Act 1881
- Act of Parliament
- Parliament of the United Kingdom
- Long title: An Act for making a railway between Swindon and Cheltenham; and for other purposes.
- Citation: 44 & 45 Vict. c. cxlvi

Dates
- Royal assent: 18 July 1881

Text of statute as originally enacted

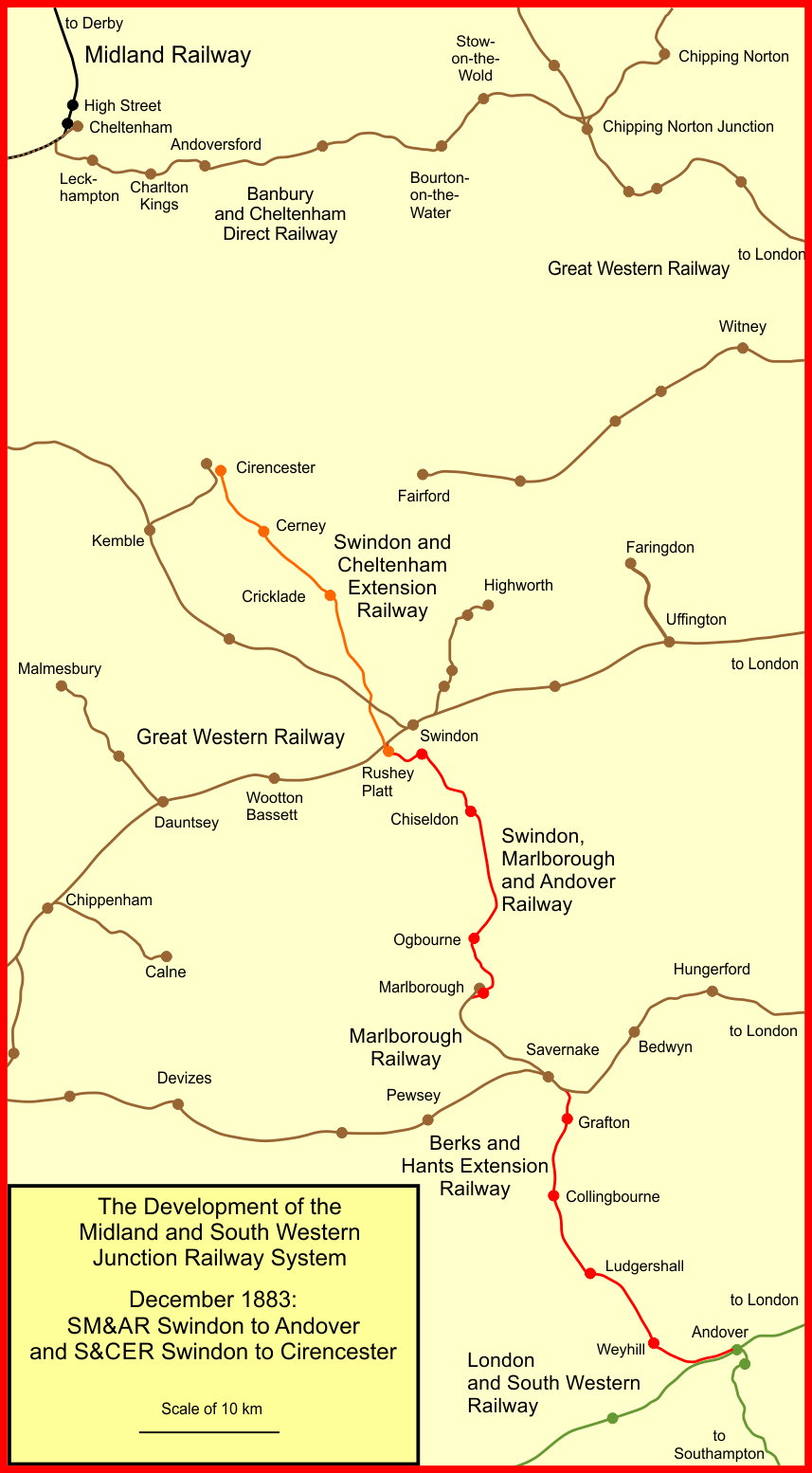
Forerunners of the MSWJR in 1883

The original aspiration had been to link the Midland Railway with the south coast: reaching Swindon was not enough. On 18 July 1881 an act of Parliament, the Swindon and Cheltenham Extension Railway Act 1881 (44 & 45 Vict. c. cxlvi), was obtained to incorporate a "nominally independent company", the Swindon and Cheltenham Extension Railway (S&CER). It was to build from Rushey Platt to Andoversford, a little to the east of Cheltenham, on the recently opened Banbury and Cheltenham Direct Railway, a member of the GWR group of affiliates. This would give the S&CER access to Cheltenham. The act authorised some branches (never built), and was secured in the face of GWR opposition, due to the S&CER's allegiance to the SM&AR and through it to the LSWR.

Obtaining the act had cost the company dear in parliamentary expenses, but it instructed Watson, Smith and Watson to proceed with construction; it appears that little supervision of the contractor was exercised, however. Moreover, the GWR continued its obstructive tactics, now in connection with the bridge for the S&CER to cross the GWR main line at Rushey Platt.

Facing serious financial difficulties as well, the company managed to open a section of line between Swindon and Cirencester on 18 December 1883 (although a token goods service had run from 1 November); there were intermediate stations at Rushey Platt (immediately south of the GWR line, with separate platforms on the curve to the GWR and the new main line), Cricklade and South Cerney. The S&CER was worked from the outset by the SM&AR.

== Midland and South Western Junction Railway ==
Swindon, Marlborough and Andover, and Swindon and Cheltenham Extension Railways (Amalgamation) Act 1884
- Act of Parliament
- Parliament of the United Kingdom
- Long title: An Act to amalgamate the Undertakings of the Swindon Marlborough and Andover and the Swindon and Cheltenham Extension Railway Companies; and for other purposes.
- Citation: 47 & 48 Vict. c. lxiv

Dates
- Royal assent: 23 June 1884

Swindon and Cheltenham Extension Railway Act 1884
- Act of Parliament
- Parliament of the United Kingdom
- Long title: An Act to confer further Powers on the Swindon and Cheltenham Extension Railway Company; and for other purposes.
- Citation: 47 & 48 Vict. c. lxviii

Dates
- Royal assent: 23 June 1884

The S&CER had been a creature of the SM&AR and had been worked by it, and it was an obvious step to amalgamate; this was done by the Swindon, Marlborough and Andover, and Swindon and Cheltenham Extension Railways (Amalgamation) Act 1884 (47 & 48 Vict. c. lxiv) on 23 June 1884, which specified that company would be renamed the Midland and South Western Junction Railway Company. The network stretched from Cirencester to Red Post Junction, still without forming a through connection northwards. Some work proceeded on the final section, but the company was in serious financial difficulty and the contractor Watson, Smith and Watson went bankrupt in 1885; they may have been working for credit. The M&SWJR itself was now unable to pay its bills and went into receivership in 1884, although it continued trading under the supervision of the Receiver in Chancery. The receiver insisted on the immediate suspension of the Swindon connecting passenger service to the GWR station, on which the M&SWJR had lost £1,464 even before paying the heavy toll charges of the GWR.

In this desperate situation the only hope was to complete the through line, and the company obtained authority to issue debenture stock (which would have precedence in any profit distribution over all prior stock issues) in 1886 and again in 1887, and a contract was let to Charles Braddock. He undertook to pay for the land acquisition and to pay some interest liabilities of the M&SWJR in return for £189,000 in perpetual 5% debenture stock.

Further troubles befell, when the Chedworth tunnel sustained a partial collapse on 9 June 1890 followed by the failure of an underbridge nearby in February 1891. Although the Swindon and Cheltenham Extension Railway Act 1884 gave running powers from Andoversford to Cheltenham over the GWR (Banbury and Cheltenham Direct Railway), their terms needed to be negotiated and once again the GWR made this as difficult as possible. A token goods service to Dowdeswell was started on 16 March 1891.

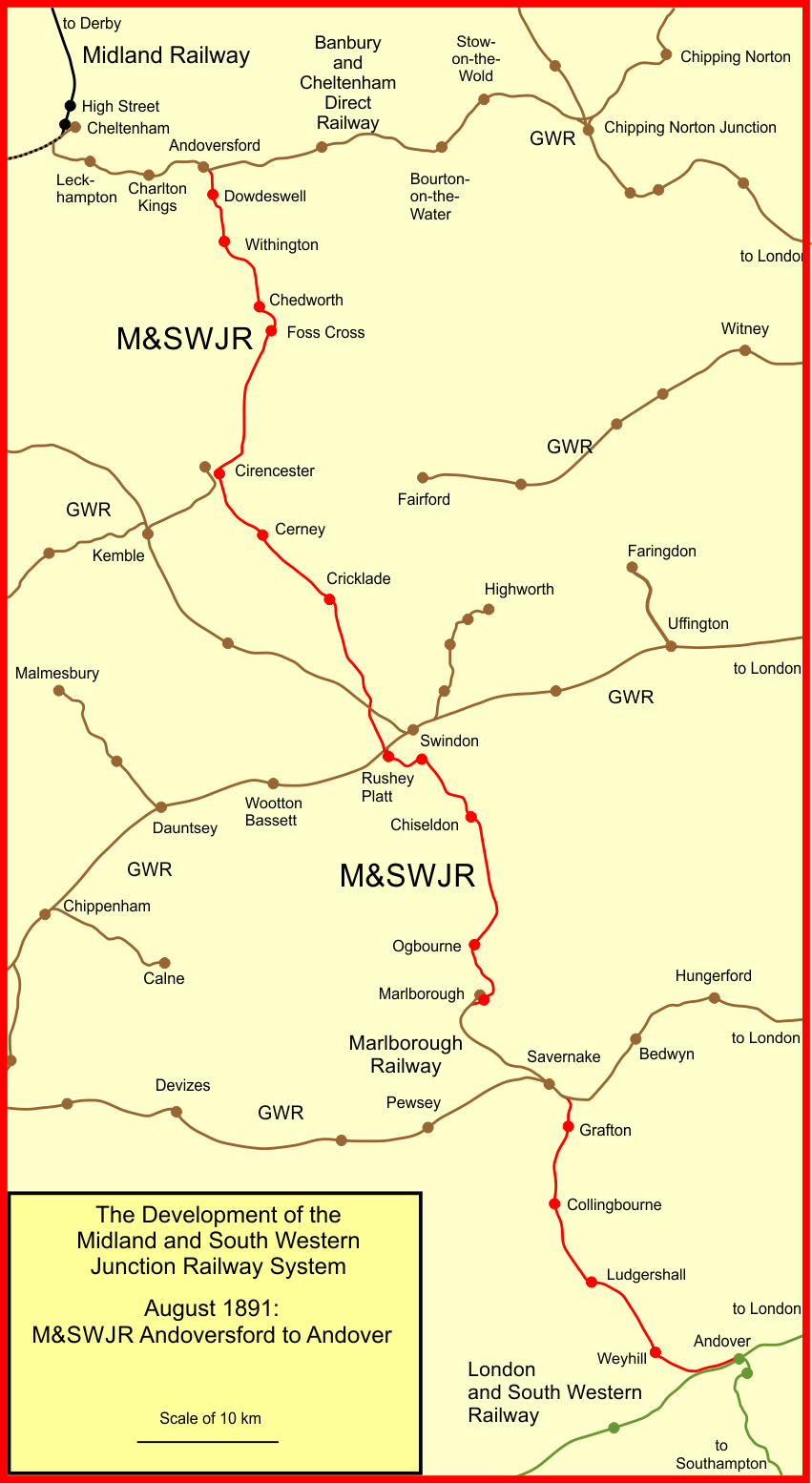
The MSWJR in 1891

On 1 August 1891 the company finally completed negotiations to reach the Midland Railway station at Cheltenham station (later Lansdown) and the trains ran throughout at last, with through carriages to Southampton worked by the LSWR from Andover. Apart from the running arrangements over other lines, the new section consisted of 13 3/4 miles (22 km) of single track; there were stations at Withington and Foss Cross. Tyer's electric tablet system was installed for signalling the single line; this was a considerable improvement on the staff and ticket system used on the previously opened sections. The Midland Railway considerably enlarged its passenger accommodation and also its goods facilities at Cheltenham High Street.

The construction of the line throughout had cost £1,300,000.

Chedworth station was opened on 1 October 1892 on the northern section, and Dowdeswell station was renamed Andoversford & Dowdeswell on 2 October 1892. Blunsdon station, south of Cerney, opened on 1 September 1895.

== Reaching Southampton ==
While reaching a connection with the Midland Railway in the north, the company achieved a success in the south: full running powers from Andover to Southampton Docks were granted by the Swindon, Marlborough and Andover Railway Act 1882 (45 & 46 Vict. c. cxcv); "a valuable right enjoyed by no other company". Goods operation started on 1 November 1892 and passenger working with M&SWJR engines and crews on 1 June 1894. The company now had finally achieved the connection to run its own trains between the Midland Railway at Cheltenham and a port on the English Channel at Southampton.

== Sam Fay ==
In the early years of the MS&WJR and its constituents, managerial control of the company's activities was poor, and receipts were weak while the interest on loans was crippling; indeed the company was in receivership. This was recognised by the directors and in 1891 they approached the London and South Western Railway (LSWR) for advice. The LSWR were supportive and seconded Sam Fay, then 35 years old, to the company; he became general manager and secretary. In five years Fay increased receipts by 63% while working expenses increased by only 13%; he was able to obtain discharge from bankruptcy for the company on 10 November 1897. After this success, Fay returned to the LSWR to become its general manager in April 1899.

== By-passing the GWR at Marlborough ==
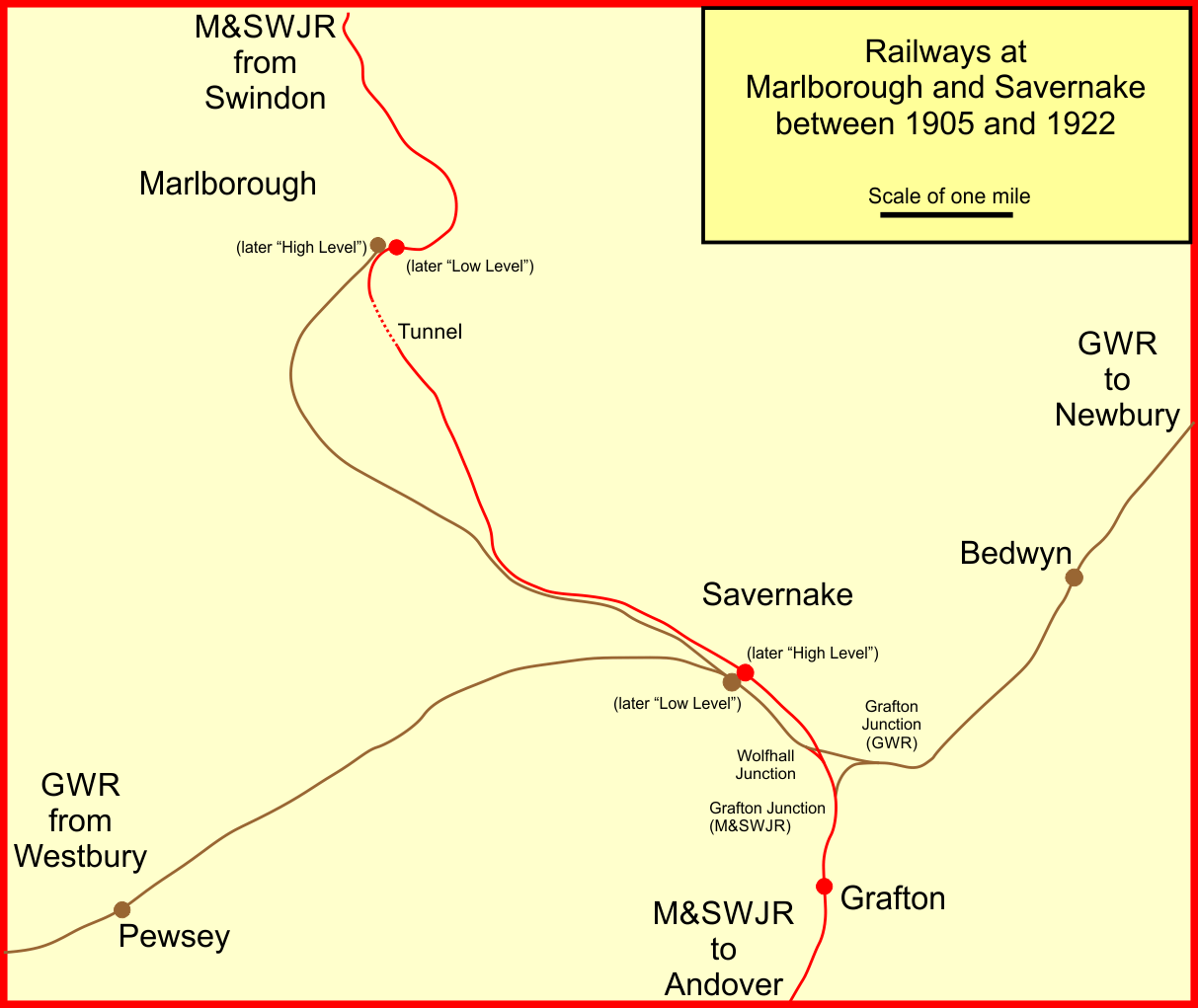
Railways near Marlborough and Savernake

The through connection had been achieved by running over the track of the hostile GWR (Note: The GWR worked the Marlborough Railway and the Berks and Hants Extension Railway and formally took them over in 1892.) from Marlborough to Grafton Junction. This showed itself in signalling delays, suggested to be contrived purposely; in restrictions on fares and goods rates, and the potential to veto through charges; and an obligatory ticket inspection stop at Savernake. Moreover, the line had steep gradients which limited the loads of through trains; and there was a charge of £3,000 annually for use of the line.

There were attempts to obtain parliamentary authorisation for a railway to pass round the GWR, in 1884 and 1889, but both foundered due to GWR opposition in Parliament. A more carefully assembled proposal was put forward in 1894, in collaboration with Henry Brudenell-Bruce, 5th Marquess of Ailesbury, owner of much land adjoining the intended route.

Marlborough and Grafton Railway Act 1896
- Act of Parliament
- Parliament of the United Kingdom
- Long title: An Act to confer further powers upon the Governor and Company of the New River brought from Chadwell and Amwell to London commonly called the New River Company for the execution, of new works the purchase of additional lands and the raising of further money and for other purposes.
- Citation: 59 & 60 Vict. c. ccxxx

Dates
- Royal assent: 7 August 1896

On this occasion the bill was successful, the nominally independent Marlborough and Grafton Railway was incorporated on 7 August 1896 by the Marlborough and Grafton Railway Act 1896 (59 & 60 Vict. c. ccxxx), and on 26 June 1898 the new line opened. The new line was 5 3/4 miles (9.3 km) in length; it was double track, and existing line from just south of Savernake to Grafton was doubled and passed to the new company. There was a 647-yard (592 m) tunnel near Marlborough and the ruling gradient was 1 in 100, markedly easier than over the Marlborough Railway. The connections into the GWR line at Marlborough and at Savernake (Wolfhall Junction) were removed.

Midland and South Western Junction Railway Act 1899
- Act of Parliament
- Parliament of the United Kingdom
- Long title: An Act to confer further powers on the Midland and South Western Junction Railway Company to authorise them to acquire the undertaking of the Marlborough and Grafton Railway Company and for other purposes.
- Citation: 62 & 63 Vict. c. clxxviii

Dates
- Royal assent: 1 August 1899

The new company was vested in the M&SWJR by the Midland and South Western Junction Railway Act 1899 (62 & 63 Vict. c. clxxviii) on 1 August 1899.

== Alliance with the Midland Railway ==
Having secured its through route to Cheltenham, the M&SWJR was able to negotiate a preferential status with the Midland Railway, which agreed to route through traffic preferentially over the line, and the Midland obtained running powers over the M&SWJR, and, remarkably, over the GWR section. The Midland also made generous loans to the M&SWJR, needed for doubling part of their route.

== Co-operation from the Great Western ==
More surprisingly, Fay negotiated a cooperative arrangement with the GWR. That company (Note: The GWR had absorbed the Banbury and Cheltenham Direct Railway in 1897.) was to double its line between Andoversford and Cheltenham, to install additional block posts (enabling closer headways), and to permit M&SWJR trains to call at intermediate stations on that line. The M&SWJR agreed to abandon a proposed new line from Andoversford to Winchcombe, north of Cheltenham, which would have bypassed the GWR section of route; this proposal is likely to have been tactical. The arrangements were confirmed by agreements of 14 March and 10 April 1899, and represented the pinnacle of the achievements of the general manager, Sam Fay.

== Tidworth ==
Tensions were increasing in South Africa, and in October 1899 hostilities resumed there, in the Second Boer War. In preparation for military action, the War Office wished to substantially expand the garrison camp at Tidworth. As part of this process, the War Office had the Tidworth Camp Railway constructed by contractors; this connected to the M&SWJR at Ludgershall. At first it was a siding, coming into use in 1901 for the construction of the barracks. On 1 July 1902 it opened for public goods traffic, and for passengers on 1 October 1902. By agreement of 16 February 1903 the M&SWJR adopted it as a public railway, leased from the War Department. It was 2 miles 33 chains (3.88 km) in length, nearly all single track.

Such was the volume of traffic associated with the military that the station became the "senior" station on the M&SWJR system, with annual receipts exceeding those on the entire remainder of the system together.

== Infrastructure changes to 1922 ==
The loan from the Midland Railway was quickly put to use in doubling most of the line; opening of double line track took place:

- from Weyhill to Ludgershall 28 August 1900
- from Andoversford to Withington 2 September 1900
- from Cirencester to Foss Cross 12 July 1901
- from Ludgershall to Collingbourne 1 September 1901
- from Foss Cross to Withington 8 June 1902
- from Collingbourne to Grafton 2 November 1902.

As part of the agreement, the GWR doubled their line between Andoversford Junction and Lansdown Junction, opening on 28 September 1902.

The passenger service on Rushey Platt curve had been withdrawn in 1885, and the passenger station itself closed on 1 October 1905.

On 25 March 1913, Moredon Platform was opened a short distance north of Rushey Platt; it was a short sleeper-built structure and seems to have been primarily intended for milk traffic. Passenger services were not advertised.

Connection to the LSWR line at Red Post Junction was prohibited, but this was waived during World War I and a connection was made there in 1917.

When the Marlborough and Grafton line was opened, the connection from the B&HER line at Wolfhall junction was left as a disused siding, but it was used for wagon transfers from 1 November 1900. It was later replaced by a facing connection controlled from a new M&SWJR signal box also called Wolfhall Junction on 28 July 1902. The GWR had obtained running powers to Ludgershall in connection with anticipated troop movements, and the GWR opened a double line east curve at Wolfhall on 6 September 1905; the earlier MS&WJR signal box was relocated somewhat to the south so as to control the junction for this curve as well as the previous west curve.

Correspondingly, the connection to the GWR line at Marlborough was removed in 1898 on opening of the M&GR line; it was reinstated for wagon transfers in November 1926.

The SM&AR line had originally been laid with Vignoles (flat bottom) rails of 70 pounds per yard (35 kg/m) in 18-to-24-foot (5.5–7.3 m) lengths, but the northward extension was laid with 75 lb/yd (37 kg/m) bullhead rail. The track limited locomotive weight, and was gradually replaced by 87 lb/yd (43 kg/m) bullhead track, but this took until 1928.

Cerney station was renamed South Cerney on 1 July 1924. Blunsdon station closed in September 1924.

== Train services ==
On the opening of the entire M&SWJR line, the passenger train service was not well organised, but in 1892 two complete trains (locomotive and carriages) were borrowed from the LSWR and these worked fast trains between Southampton and Cheltenham until M&SWJR stock was available. The best trains ran before the start of World War I, taking 2 h 27 min northbound and 2 h 36 min southbound between Southampton West (now renamed Central) and Cheltenham, a distance of 94 3/4 miles (152.5 km). Through coaches were taken on by the Midland Railway to various destinations including Sheffield, Manchester, Bradford and Leeds.

== Locomotives ==
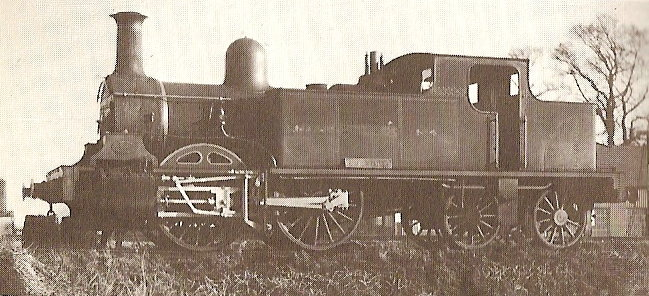
Swindon Marlborough & Andover Railway single Fairlie 0-4-4T locomotive of 1878.

The SM&AR purchased three 0-6-0 tank locomotives from Dübs and Company for its opening; numbered 1 to 3, they had 4-foot (1,219 mm) diameter wheels and outside cylinders. Three 2-4-0 tank engines were acquired from Beyer Peacock in 1882 and a fourth in 1884. These were intended for passenger work and were numbered 5 to 8, having 5-foot-6-inch (1,676 mm) wheels and outside cylinders. The latter proved more effective for longer hauls.

No. 4 in the series was an 0-4-4 Fairlie tank engine with 5 ft 6 in (1,676 mm) driving wheels and Walschaerts valve gear. This had been built by the Avonside Engine Company as a demonstration for the Paris exhibition of 1878 and was purchased by the SM&AR in 1882. It proved to be unreliable and expensive to maintain, and in 1892 it was scrapped on the orders of Fay.

The bankrupt company now had only seven locomotives to operate its extended route, and in 1893 a director, Percy Mortimer, advanced the purchase price of a 4-4-0 tender engine, from Dübs; it became no. 9. It had 6-foot (1,829 mm) driving wheels, but at 69 long tons (70 t) with tender, it was too heavy for the railway's light track. Fay now managed to establish a trust for the purpose of funding locomotive purchase (and the building of a new repair depot at Cirencester), and in 1894 the company acquired three lighter 2-4-0 tender locomotives with 5 ft 6 in (1,680 mm) wheels, numbers 10 to 12. These three locomotives were taken into the GWR locomotive stock when the M&SWJR was absorbed by that company in 1923 under the Railways Act 1921.

In 1894 the company also acquired two 0-6-0 tank locomotives with inside cylinders from Dübs, numbered 13 and 4 (the Fairlie locomotive having been scrapped).

Three locomotives were acquired from Beyer, Peacock and Company: an 0-4-4 tank engine with 5 ft 2 in (1,575 mm) wheels, no. 15, and a distinctive 2-6-0 tender engine originally destined for a South American railway but never delivered. This locomotive, acquired in 1895, became no 14 and had 4-foot driving wheels and outside cylinders, but required some adjustments for use in England including the front buffer beam being mounted slightly above the frames. When running fast on freights no. 14 had a very distinctive gait which gained it the nickname of Galloping Alice. The locomotive was so successful that another identical one was ordered, no. 16 being delivered in 1897.

In 1897, two 4-4-4 tank engines with 5 ft 3 in (1,600 mm) driving wheels were purchased from Sharp, Stewart and Company; they proved to be useful on stopping passenger trains and were numbered 17 and 18.

Six 0-6-0 tender engines were purchased from Beyer, Peacock in 1899 and a further four in 1902; they had 5 ft 2 1/2 in (1,588 mm) wheels and proved capable on both goods and passenger work; they were numbered 19 to 28. They were followed by nine 4-4-0 tender engines acquired from the North British Locomotive Company, delivered from 1905 to 1914. They had 5 ft 9 in (1,753 mm) driving wheels. At 82 long tons (83 t) with tender they were heavy, but by this time the permanent way had been strengthened by rail replacement. Their tractive effort was 14,650 lbf (65.2 kN) at 75% of working boiler pressure. They were numbered 1 to 8, and 31.

All except the original numbers 1–8 passed to the Great Western Railway at the grouping in 1923. Only numbers 10–12 survived into British Railways ownership in 1948. These three became GWR and BR numbers 1334, 1335, 1336.

== Signalling ==
The signalling system adopted on the first lines of the constituent companies of the M&SWJR was train staff and ticket. The signals provided by the contractor showed a white aspect when clear, and red at danger, an arrangement not uncommon at the time.

When the northern extension was opened from Cirencester to Andoversford Junction, the more modern and flexible Tyers electric tablet was adopted. When the double-track Marlborough and Grafton line was opened, Sykes lock-and-block was installed. This is a sophisticated system whose advantage is in handling densely trafficked lines; its complexity was a disadvantage and it was replaced in 1902 with Tyers single-wire three-position block instruments; the latter pattern was being installed on the newly widened double-track sections elsewhere on the route.

When the 1933 rationalisation took place in the Marlborough and Savernake areas, there remained a short section of single line between Wolfhall Junction and Grafton South Junction; this was track circuited and worked without token or staff, by "special single line instrument", the section signals being electrically interlocked; this was one of the first such installations in the country.

By 1960 the signalling system was "electric token" throughout the single line sections, except for the short section at Wolfhall Junction referred to above. Absolute block applied on the double track sections: Savernake West to Wolfhall Jn and Grafton South Jn to Red Post Jn; there was a three-road section from Swindon "A" to Swindon "B" signal box.

== Operating methods ==
Adrian Vaughan recounts an anecdotal conversation about the M&SWJR's operating methods; a man called Nelson Edwards is recalling pre-grouping days; with him are Bill Curtis, ex M&SWJR, and Sid Tyler, GWR:

"We were even short of goods brake vans. When we wanted to run a trip out to Moredon power station with coal we had a special brake van kept for the job—it was an old water tank. When I stood inside it acting as guard my head just poked out of the filler hole nicely, shorter chaps stood on a box inside."

"Not only that," said Bill, "but we were short on tail lamps too. If a special had to run up to Tidworth we often had to hang a churn lid on the buffer of the last wagon." Nelson agreed that this was done on the Moredon trips too.

"Well I'm damned," said Sid, "what would you have done if the couplings had broken and you were in a water tank at the back of the train going up the bank from Rushey [Platt] to [Swindon] Old Town? You've no chance without brakes, down the hill and of at the first catch point!"

Nelson and Bill grinned happily at the fuss Sid was making. "It was a man at the rear of the train anyhow," said Bill. "That was better than nothing."

== Grouping ==
=== General changes ===
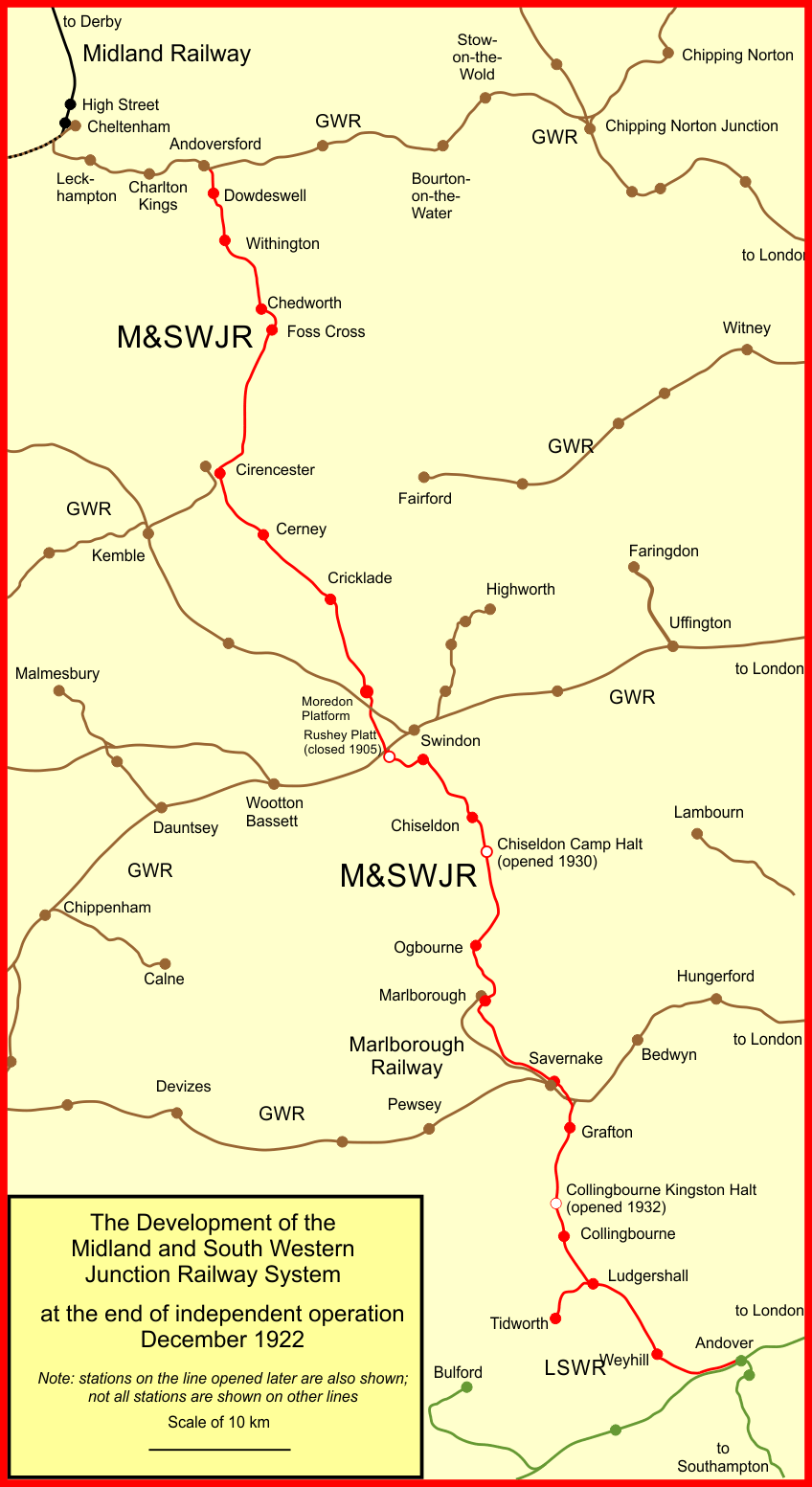
The MSWJR in 1922

At the beginning of 1923, most of the railways of Great Britain were "grouped" into one of four large companies, under the Railways Act 1921. The Great Western Railway absorbed numerous smaller lines, including the M&SWJR; the effective date was 1 July 1923. At this time the M&SWJR owned 29 locomotives, 134 coaching vehicles, and 379 goods and service vehicles.

The company was in a poor condition in financial terms: the capital outlay had totalled £2,120,000, and in the best year 1913, cash available for distribution after loan interest, rents, etc., was about £25,000; with several categories of preference shares, this meant that ordinary shareholders had received nothing. Shareholders received £4 per cent for preference stocks and £2 per cent for ordinary shares, paid in GWR deferred certificates.

In planning through trains from the North and Midlands to the South Coast, the GWR found the M&SWJR unattractive: it ran towards the south-east, at Andover facing east, and failed to make a useful connection at Swindon. The GWR preferred to develop the route via Oxford and Basingstoke which was double track throughout, and already engineered as a trunk line. At Cheltenham, the GWR continued to run the M&SWJR route trains to the Midland (now LMS) station. However the GWR restored the Swindon Town to Swindon main line station link, from 22 October 1923.

The new owner was unsympathetic to the poor receipts brought in by the line: this was especially the case north of Rushey Platt. Virtually the whole of the down line from Cirencester to Rushey Platt was in need of relaying, and the GWR set about single-tracking that section in the first years of its ownership of the line to obviate part of the renewal; the process was completed in 1927, with two crossing places. It also instituted its "economic system of track maintenance" in which there were to be planned gaps in the revenue earning train service to enable permanent way maintenance to be carried out; this was combined with the GWR motor trolley system on the northern section, in which motorised rail vehicles could operate on the line to convey men and materials to work sites.

The M&SWJR station at Andoversford & Dowdeswell duplicated the GWR Andoversford station, which could serve both the MS&WJR line and the Kingham line; Andoversford & Dowdeswell closed on 1 April 1927.

In 1929, Swindon Borough Council required to increase electricity generating capacity, and it commissioned a new power station at Moredon. The location was at the present-day Purton Road near the junction with Thamesdown Drive, but at that time was in a rural location. Coal was brought in over the M&SWJR line—up to 200 wagons a day.

In 1930 the GWR put in hand a scheme to strengthen the numerous weak bridges on the line, enabling heavier locomotives to run.

Blunsdon station was very little used by passengers, and its train service had been reduced to one southbound call per week (in reality for milk traffic) from 1922; from September 1924 the passenger call was terminated, and Moredon Platform closed on 1 October 1932. New stations were opened at Chiseldon Camp (1 December 1930) (Note: Maggs says "After the war a platform was opened at Chiseldon Camp, the Southern Command demobilisation centre. This must have been temporary.) and Collingbourne Kingston (1 April 1932).

Cirencester station was renamed Cirencester Watermoor on 1 July 1924; Withington station was renamed Withington (Gloucestershire) on the same day.

The World War I connection to the LSWR line at Red Post Junction was removed in 1936.

=== Rationalisation at Marlborough and Savernake ===
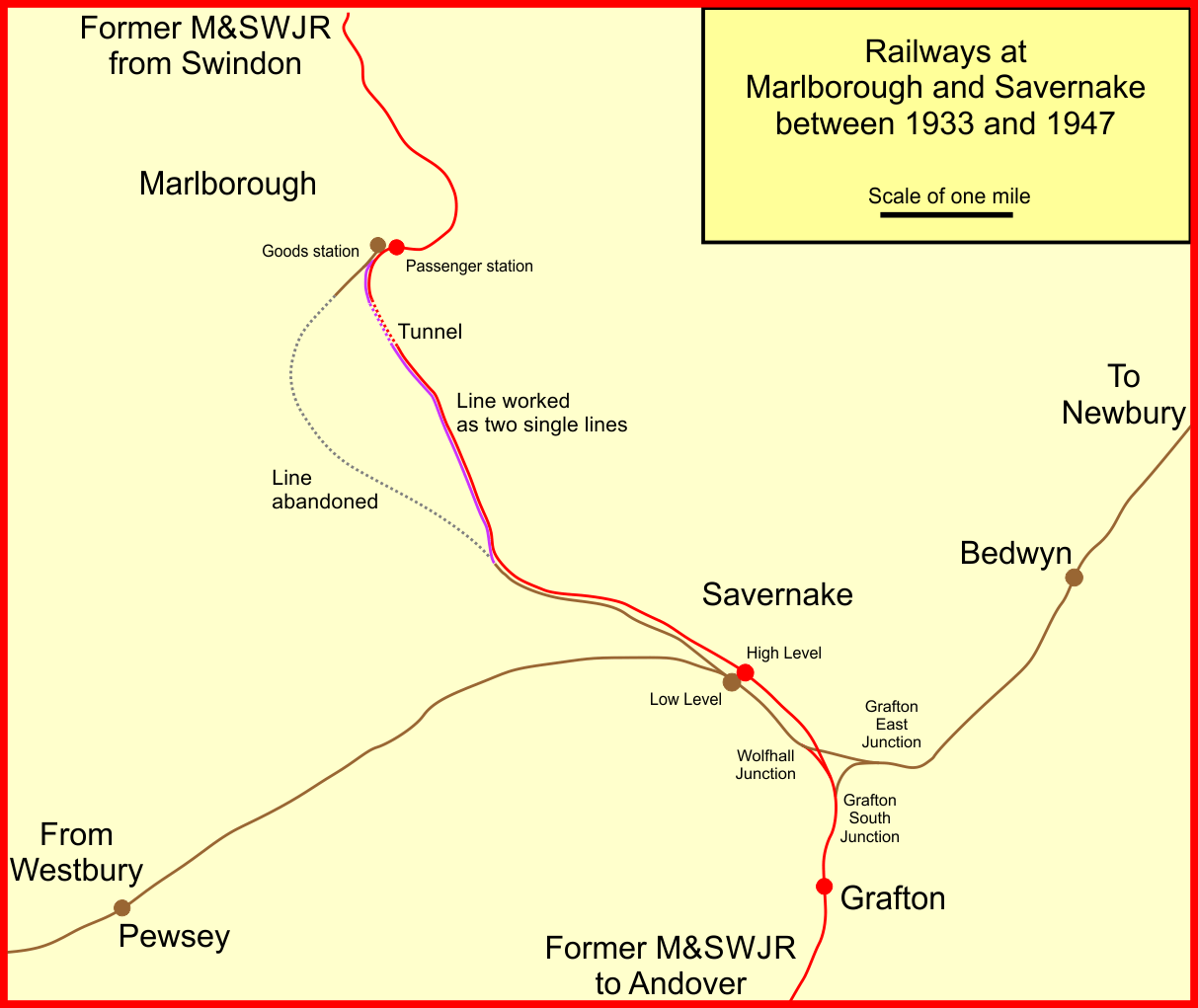
Marlborough and Savernake railways from 1933

In 1923 the GWR found itself with two stations at both Marlborough and Savernake, and duplicate lines between them. No immediate action was taken, except that distinguishing names were allocated from 1 July 1924: Marlborough Low Level and Savernake High Level for the M&SWJR stations; and the original connection between the two lines at Marlborough was reinstated for wagon transfer in November 1926.

Savings could have been made by immediately closing the old Marlborough Railway line and the M&GR route, and both Marlborough High Level and Savernake High Level stations, by the provision of a link from the GWR branch to the M&SWJR line at Hat Gate, immediately west of Forest Road overbridge a little west of Savernake stations, where the two routes ran close alongside one another. However this would have introduced a ruling gradient of 1 in 60 on the line, at the Wolfhall and Grafton spur.

In fact nothing was done until 1933, when a less radical rationalisation was carried out: the former M&SWJR double track route was made into two single lines from Marlborough Tunnel South: the M&SWJR down (southbound) line was now dedicated to through trains to and from Savernake High Level over the M&GR line, and the former up (northbound) line connected to Savernake Low Level (the old Berks and Hants Extension line) using the link at Hat Gate; the majority of the original Marlborough Railway branch was closed and passenger traffic concentrated on the M&SWJR station there. This was implemented with effect from Monday 27 February 1933.

== Second World War and after ==
The exigencies of the Second World War caused the reinstatement of the Red Post Junction connection on 5 September 1943, together with doubling between Weyhill and the junction. Most of the crossing loops were extended to accommodate 60 wagons plus engine and van. There were extensive troop exercise areas and camps on the line, and in addition the north-south link leading to Southampton was heavily used for military purposes.

Marlborough Tunnel required to be relined; it had given trouble before, and the track had been interlaced during the work. By now, however the rationalisation scheme had converted the double line into two single lines, for Savernake High Level and Low Level trains respectively. Between 26 July 1944 and 18 August 1946, there were temporary signal boxes: Marlborough Tunnel North and Marlborough Tunnel South, with a single line operating through the tunnel and the split for Savernake stations taking place at Marlborough Tunnel South.

A large ammunition store was established north of Savernake in July 1940; US troops operated it, supplying armaments during the Battle of the Atlantic, and it later became especially important in the build-up for the Invasion of Normandy in 1944. The rail connection to Southampton was important. At first the base was served by loading and unloading at Marlborough goods yard, but in mid-1943 work started on establishing a rail to road transfer site; the connection was located about half a mile (about 1 km) west of Hat Gate Cottage at a ground frame, and was commissioned on 18 August 1943. This had been the site of the 1933 connection between the M&SWJR and GWR lines. The siding ran north in three reception sidings, and then north-east in two mileage sidings, where the actual unloading took place. The sidings were known as North Savernake Sidings, and came into use on 18 August 1943. The location is shown as a wooded strip of land marked "Dismtd Rly" on the current (2013) Ordnance Survey map. and the hard standing area is now (2013) in use as light industry.

At the end of hostilities the site continued to be used for recovered ammunition, prior to disposal at sea.

There was a serious explosion at the site on 2 January 1946. GWR locomotive no 2816 had arrived with an ammunition train with 32 wagons of ammunition from Newport Eastern Valley. After the locomotive was uncoupled and running round the train, there was an explosion in one of the wagons; several wagons were immediately set on fire. 2816 was reattached and pulled part of the train clear, but was unable to remove the cut to the main line as the tablet was not available. There were second and third explosions; 8 soldiers were killed and several seriously injured. Awards of the George Cross were made to Major Kenneth Biggs and Staff Sergeant Sydney Rogerson for their actions during this incident, along with awards of an MBE, two George Medals and five British Empire Medals to others present. Biggs also received the Bronze Star, as a proportion of the ammunition was American.

The ammunition dump was cleared by July 1940, and the connection removed in July 1950.

== From 1948 ==
The railways were nationalised in 1948 under the Transport Act 1947. The former M&SWJR network was divided between the Western and Southern Regions of British Railways; the boundary was just north of Grafton. However, on 1 February 1958 the entire line fell to the Western Region, and on 3 November 1958 the remaining trains ran to Cheltenham St James instead of Lansdown.

Tidworth branch passenger traffic ceased on 18 September 1955 and the line was transferred back to the War Department on 28 November 1955; it continued in military use until 31 July 1963, and the track was lifted the following year, although the short spur from the main line to Ludgershall depot was retained. Grafton Curve, justified for military traffic, closed on 5 May 1957. On 15 September 1958 Savernake High Level was closed and the M&GR route itself followed in 1960.

Running through thinly populated territory and without fast running capability, the line declined and by 1961 was losing £113,000 a year. It closed to passengers on 9 September 1961; the entire line closed except freight stubs from Savernake to Marlborough, Swindon main line to Swindon Town and Cirencester, and Andover to Ludgershall. Schools vacation services to Marlborough continued until freight was withdrawn too in 1964 (on 7 September).

On 1 April that year the Cirencester service was finished, with that line shortened to serve Moredon Power Station as required. The power station only came on stream on days of peak loading. It closed in 1979, but railborne traffic to it had ceased in 1969; until then it had been operated from Swindon via Rushey Platt, reversing there.

The stub to Swindon Town was used for stone traffic relating to the construction of the M4 Motorway in the 1970s. The final revenue working was an enthusiasts' railtour in 1972: the "Somerset Quarrymen's Special", and by 1978 all track had been lifted.

== Today ==
The military depot at Ludgershall is connected to the main line at Andover over the former M&SWJR route, although much of the depot was demolished in 2015.

Two M&SWJR coaches have survived: the body No. 58 Brake Composite, built in 1890, is in private ownership with the original lettering and paintwork, and No. 64 stands in a private residence at Lavrean, Luxulyan in Cornwall.

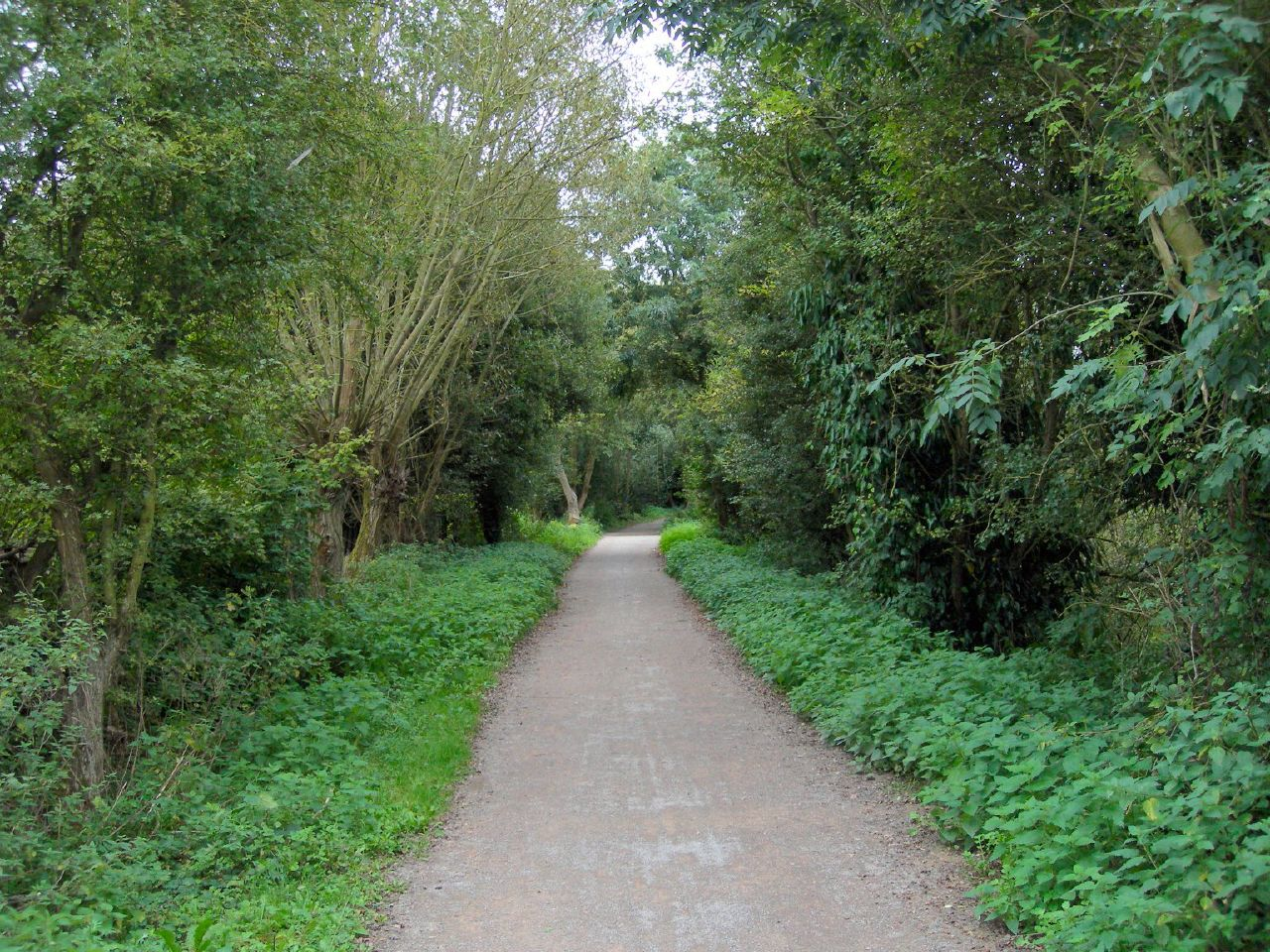
Former trackbed of the railway south of Swindon

So far as closed sections are concerned:

- A short length has been re-opened and operates as the heritage Swindon and Cricklade Railway.
- The M4 motorway has been built over a short section of the route between Chiseldon and Swindon.
- Station Old Town Industrial Estate now occupies the site of the Swindon Town station. (Note: there is an unconnected Swindon Station Industrial Estate, which is on the site of part of the former GWR workshops.)
- National Cycle Network route 482 follows the Chiseldon to Marlborough Railway Path.

In January 2019, Campaign for Better Transport released a report listing the line from Swindon to Marlborough as "priority 2" for reopening. This classification is for lines which require further development or a change in circumstances (such as housing developments).

== See also ==
- Swindon, Marlborough and Andover Railway
- Locomotives of the Great Western Railway
- Crossings of the River Thames
