= Swindon and Cricklade Railway =

Heritage railway in Wiltshire, England

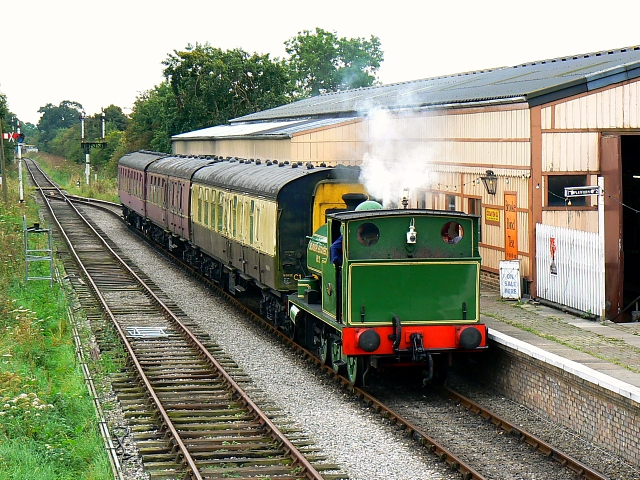
- Slough Estates No.3 with a service train at Hayes Knoll
- Locale: Swindon, Wiltshire, England
- Terminus: Blunsdon
- Coordinates: 51.607°N 1.8436°W

Commercial operations
- Original gauge: 4 ft 8 1/2 in (1,435 mm) standard gauge

Preserved operations
- Length: 2.5 miles (4.0 km)
- Preserved gauge: 4 ft 8 1/2 in (1,435 mm) standard gauge

Preservation history
- 1978: Preservation Society formed
- 1984: S&CR granted light railway order (following reconstruction of the line)
- 1985: S&CR re-opened and runs its first trains
- 1999: Hayes Knoll Station opened.
- 2008: South Meadow reached
- 2012: Taw Valley Halt reached
- 2014: Taw Valley Halt officially opened
- Headquarters: Blunsdon

The Swindon and Cricklade Railway is a heritage railway in Wiltshire, England, that operates on a short section of the old Midland and South Western Junction Railway line between Swindon and Cricklade.

Swindon and Cricklade Railway is a registered charity.

== Preservation history ==
The Swindon and Cricklade Railway Preservation Society was formed by a group of enthusiasts in November 1978 to reconstruct and preserve a section of the Midland & South Western Junction Railway that ran from Andover, Hampshire, to Cheltenham, Gloucestershire.

The volunteer-operated railway has reopened three stations: Hayes Knoll, Taw Valley Halt and Blunsdon, the headquarters of the line. Hayes Knoll features a restored signalbox that is operational during special events and a running/restoration shed. The length of the restored line is a little under 2 1/2 miles (4.0 km).

The line extends north to South Meadow Lane (a few hundred yards from the site of a proposed Farfield Lane halt) near Cricklade, and south to Taw Valley Halt on the outskirts of Swindon, near Mouldon Hill Country Park. A southern terminus, Mouldon Hill, is proposed within the park.

== Locomotives ==
=== Steam locomotives ===
Number & Name	Class	Notes	Photograph
No. 2354 Richard Trevithick	Andrew Barclay 0-4-0ST	Built in 1954. Undergoing a ten-yearly overhaul.	
No. 1464 MSC No. 70	Hudswell Clarke 0-6-0T	Built in 1921. Undergoing overhaul.	
No. 3135 Spartan	Fablok TKh49 Class 0-6-0T	Built in 1953. Under Overhaul	
No. 5637	GWR 5600 Class 0-6-2T	No. 5637 was built in 1925. It entered traffic at Cardiff Cathays shed in late September 1925, but was transferred six weeks later to Barry shed and was used on local services in the Newport and Cardiff districts. No. 5637 spent all its life in South Wales, being withdrawn from traffic in June 1964 and later sold to Woodham Brothers, arriving at Barry scrapyard in September 1964. In August 1974, No. 5637 became the 61st locomotive to escape from Barry, when it was sold to the Birmingham Railway Museum at Tyseley. In 1981 it was resold, without any restoration having been carried out, to Thamesdown Borough Council for leasing to the Swindon and Cricklade Railway. Some time after, it was purchased by a group of volunteers at the Swindon & Cricklade Railway. In 1998, after almost 18 years of restoration, No. 5637 was steamed for the first time since 1964. The locomotive was subsequently transferred by road to the East Somerset Railway for running in, and stayed there ever since. It has become the primary engine at the ESR, running most of the services. No.5637 has moved back to the Swindon and Cricklade railway in March. Undergoing overhaul after current boiler ticket expired in April 2020.	

=== Diesel locomotives ===
Number & Name	Class	Notes	Photograph
03 022 (D2022)	BR Class 03 0-6-0DM	Built in 1958. Operational, returned to service in October 2019 after a general overhaul.	
D2152	BR Class 03 0-6-0DM	Built in 1960. Cut-down cab variant. Operational, Painted BR Black with wasp stripes.	
PWM651	BR Class 97/6 0-6-0DE	Built in 1959. Arrived from Strathspey Railway in August 2015. Operational.	
D3261	BR Class 08 0-6-0DE	Built in 1956. Operational, Returned to service in October 2010.	
E6003 Sir Herbert Walker	BR Class 73 Bo-Bo electro-diesel	Built in 1962, Operational.	
No. 21442 "Woodbine"	Fowler 0-4-0DM	Built in 1941. Operational.	
BF7342	Fowler 0-4-0DM	Built in 1958. Operational	
No. 4220031	Fowler 0-4-0DM	Built in 1964. Operational. Re-engined with Rolls Royce C6, mainly used as a shed/yard shunter.	Fowler 0-4-0DM no. 4220031 at Hayes Knoll in April 2023
No. 4240015	Fowler 0-4-0DM	Built in 1962. Being overhauled	

=== Diesel multiple units ===
Number & Name	Class	Notes	Photograph
	Class 119 unit 119 021 (formed of 51074+51104)	Built in 1958/1959. Undergoing repairs.	
W79978	BR British Railways AC railbus	Built in 1958. Undergoing restoration.	

=== Specialist vehicles ===
- TASC 45 No. 98504, built by Plasser & Theurer for British Rail. A four-wheel vehicle with side-tipping dropside rear body, crew cab with mess facilities and a HIAB crane on the rear. Used regularly on works trains and on galas.
- Wickham trolley No 9031 (Type 27 Mk III, Works No. 8089), a small four-wheeled vehicle for departmental use. Crew cab seating eight. Smaller than normal railway vehicles to standard loading gauge, as it is roughly 6 feet (1.8 m) tall. Has no external couplings/drawbar or buffers. Operational and fitted with Kohler diesel engine.

== Vintage railway coaches ==
Origin	Number	Type	Notes	Photograph
GWR	No. 7545	GWR Toplight Brake corridor Tri-composite	built 1907 – extensive restoration in progress	
GWR	No. 3898	GWR Toplight corridor third	built 1920 – awaiting restoration. Later turned into a camping coach.	
GWR	No. 7362	GWR Collett BCK Sunshine	Stored awaiting restoration.	
TVR	No. 73	Taff Vale Railway Composite coach.	built 1890 – restoration completed using ex Fruit D chassis.	
CR	No. 104	Cambrian Railways Full Brake	Recovered from derelict property in North Devon in August 2018. Will run with No. 110 when complete. Now under restoration.	
CR	No. 110	Cambrian Railways 1st/2nd composite	built 1894 – coach body being restored.	
NLR	No. 111	North London Railway 1st class	Underframe suitable for 111 in stock. Work on rebuilding original frame has begun.	
GWR	No. 422	Luggage Brake	New-build brake carriage being converted from a goods brake for use on the vintage trains with Taff Vale 73. This is due to the possibility of obtaining a vintage brake carriage being very slim. Possibility of entering service in 2019.	

== Express Railway coaches ==
Number & Name	Class	Notes	Photograph
No. W13233	BR British Railways MK1 FK	Operational, Painted in BR Maroon.	
No. 645	Norwegian Saloon	Static Display at Blunsdon.	
No. 1569	BR British Railways MK1 RKB	Built in 1960. Operational, painted in Moonraker livery.	
No. 4766	BR British Railways MK1 TSO	Built in 1957. Operational, painted in Moonraker livery.	
No. 1805	BR British Railways MK1 RMB	Built in 1957. Stored	
No. 4598	BR British Railways MK1 TSO	Rebuilt as a QXX Cinema Coach, Operational	

== Wagons ==
Origin	Number	Type	Notes	Photograph
LMS	PBA27	4-wheel ventilated van	Unknown build date. Later used by the Port of Bristol Authority and numbered 27. Recently restored to operational condition and painted blue with a 'Jewson' logo.	
GWR	27907, later 17980	4-wheel goods brake van	Likely an early date GWR Toad due to the spoked wheels. Heavily modified for passenger use. Previously at Swindon Steam Museum	Operational.
Swindon and Cricklade Rly	3	4-wheel weedkilling wagon	Converted from a four-wheel wagon underframe. Used for killing of weeds.	
GWR	92953, later PBA61047	Four-wheel China Clay Wagon	Built in 1913 at Swindon. Previously used by Port of Bristol Authority.	
BR	200241	Four-wheel non-ventilated van	Built in 1969 at Ashford.	

== Stations of the S&CR line ==
Station	Notes
South Meadow Lane	Halfway point between Hayes Knoll and Farfield Lane; used as a return point to Hayes Knoll when running north from Blunsdon. No run-round loop, no platform facilities.
Hayes Knoll	Depot and workshop; no road access
Blunsdon	Headquarters of the line
Taw Valley Halt	Opened in 2014. Used as a return point to Blunsdon when running south from Hayes Knoll, and is the current terminus of the line (until funding, planning and issues with the existing utilities can be overcome to allow access to Mouldon Hill station to be built)
