= River Ray, Wiltshire =

River in Wiltshire, England

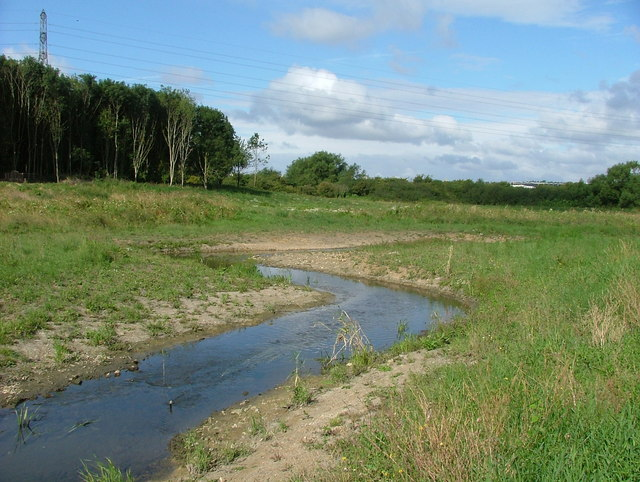
- River Ray at Rivermead, Swindon

Location
- Country: England
- Counties: Wiltshire
- Towns: Swindon

Physical characteristics
- Source
  - location: Wroughton, Wiltshire
  - coordinates: 51°31′24″N 1°47′29″W
- Mouth: River Thames
  - location: Calcutt, Wiltshire
  - coordinates: 51°38′39″N 1°49′20″W
- Length: 21.8 km (13.5 mi)
- Discharge
  - location: Water Eaton, Wiltshire
  - average: 1.28 m^{3}/s (45 cu ft/s)
  - minimum: 0.26 m^{3}/s (9.2 cu ft/s)28 August 1976
  - maximum: 32.2 m^{3}/s (1,140 cu ft/s)27 September 1974

The River Ray is a tributary of the River Thames in England which flows through Wiltshire.

The river rises at Wroughton to the south of Swindon and runs in a generally northern direction, passing to the west of the town via Shaw. Near Roughmoor it is joined from the west by the Lydiard Brook. The river joins the Thames on the southern bank near Calcutt, east of Cricklade, just upstream of Water Eaton House Bridge. Its length is about 11.5 km (7.1 mi) from its source to the Lydiard Brook, and 10.3 km (6.4 mi) from there to the Thames.

The river has been subject to a restoration project run by the Wiltshire Wildlife Trust. The final stage, completed in December 2007, was to build a tunnel near the Great Western Way at Rivermead to allow the nine species of fish to travel the length of the river without obstruction.

== See also ==
- Tributaries of the River Thames
- List of rivers in England

Next confluence upstream	River Thames	Next confluence downstream
River Key (south)	River Ray, Wiltshire	River Coln (north) with Thames and Severn Canal
