= List of schools in Swindon =

Schools in Swindon, Wiltshire

This is a list of schools in the Borough of Swindon in the English county of Wiltshire.

== State-funded schools ==
=== Primary schools ===
- Abbey Farm Educate Together Primary, Blunsdon St Andrew
- Abbey Meads Community Primary School, Abbey Meads
- Badbury Park Primary School, Coate
- Beechcroft Infant School, Upper Stratton
- Bishopstone CE Primary School, Bishopstone
- Bridlewood Primary School, Blunsdon St Andrew
- Brook Field Primary School, Shaw
- Catherine Wayte Primary School, Abbey Meads
- Chiseldon Primary School, Chiseldon
- Colebrook Infant Academy, Stratton St Margaret
- Colebrook Junior School, Stratton St Margaret
- Covingham Park Primary School, Covingham
- The Croft Primary School, Old Town South
- Drove Primary School, New Town
- East Wichel Primary School, Wichelstowe
- Eastrop Infant School, Eastrop
- Eldene Primary School, Eldene
- Even Swindon Primary School, Even Swindon
- Ferndale Primary School, Rodbourne
- Goddard Park Community Primary School, Park North
- Gorse Hill Primary School, Gorse Hill
- Grange Infants' School, Stratton St Margaret
- Grange Junior School, Stratton St Margaret
- Greenmeadow Primary School, Greenmeadow
- Haydon Wick Primary School, Haydon Wick
- Haydonleigh Primary School, Haydon Wick
- Hazelwood Academy, Toothill
- Holy Cross RC Primary School, Walcot
- Holy Family RC Primary School, Park North
- Holy Rood RC Primary School
- King William Street CE Primary School
- Kingfisher CE Academy, Wichelstowe
- Lainesmead Primary School. Walcot West
- Lawn Primary School, Lawn
- Lethbridge Primary School, Old Town
- Liden Academy, Liden
- Millbrook Primary School, Freshbrook
- Moredon Primary School, Moredon
- Mountford Manor Primary School, Walcot
- Nythe Primary School, Nythe
- Oakhurst Community Primary School, Oakhurst
- Oaktree Primary School, Park South
- Oliver Tomkins CE Infant School, Toothill
- Oliver Tomkins CE Junior School, Toothill
- Orchid Vale Primary School, Haydon End
- Peatmoor Community Primary School, Peatmoor
- Red Oaks Primary School, Redhouse
- Robert Le Kyng Primary School, Kingshill
- Rodbourne Cheney Primary School, Rodbourne Cheney
- Ruskin Junior School, Upper Stratton
- St Catherine's RC Primary School, Upper Stratton
- St Francis CE Primary School, Taw Hill
- St Leonard's CE Primary Academy, Blunsdon
- St Mary's RC Primary School, Rodbourne
- Seven Fields Primary School, Penhill
- Shaw Ridge Primary School, Shaw
- South Marston CE Primary School, South Marston
- Southfield Junior School, Highworth
- Swindon Academy, Pinehurst
- Tadpole Farm CE Primary Academy, Tadpole Garden Village
- Tregoze Primary School, Grange Park
- Wanborough Primary School, Wanborough
- Westlea Primary School, Westlea
- Westrop Primary School, Westrop
- William Morris Primary School, Tadpole Garden Village
- Wroughton Infant School, Wroughton
- Wroughton Junior School, Wroughton

=== Secondary schools ===
- Abbey Park School, Redhouse
- Commonweal School, Old Town
- The Deanery CE Academy, Wichelstowe
- The Dorcan Academy, Covingham
- Great Western Academy, Tadpole Garden Village
- Highworth Warneford School, Highworth
- Kingsdown School, Stratton St Margaret
- Lawn Manor Academy, Walcot West
- Lydiard Park Academy, Grange Park
- Nova Hreod Academy, Moredon
- The Ridgeway School and Sixth Form College, Wroughton
- St Joseph's Catholic College, Walcot
- Swindon Academy, Pinehurst
- UTC Swindon, Railway Village

=== Special and alternative schools ===
- Brimble Hill Special School, Redhouse
- The Chalet School, Liden
- Churchward School, Priory Vale
- Crowdys Hill School, Kembrey Park
- EOTAS Swindon, Ferndale
- Nyland School, Nythe
- St Luke's Academy, Upper Stratton
- Uplands School, Redhouse

=== Further education ===
- New College, Walcot
- Swindon College, North Star

== Independent schools ==
=== Senior and all-through schools ===
- Maranatha Christian School, Sevenhampton
