= Lydiard Park Academy =

Location
- Grange Park Way; Swindon, Wiltshire, SN5 6HN; England; 51°33′29″N 1°50′45″W

Information
- Type: Academy
- Established: 1986 (as Greendown Community School), 2012 (as Lydiard Park Academy)
- Specialists: Maths and Computing College, Sports College
- Department for Education URN: 137264 Tables
- Principal: Gary Pearson
- Gender: Coeducational
- Age: 11 to 18
- Enrolment: 1305
- Colours: Navy and gold
- Website: www.lydiardparkacademy.org.uk

Lydiard Park Academy, formerly known as Greendown Community School, is a mixed sex comprehensive secondary school for pupils aged between 11 and 18 years in the Grange Park area of Swindon, England. As of February 2026, there were 1305 pupils enrolled. It adopted academy status in August 2011 and is the founding member of The Park Academies Trust.

== History ==
The school's logo prior to the current Headmaster taking over

The school opened in 1986 adjacent to Lydiard Country Park to serve as a comprehensive for the newly constructed area. In the late 1990s a prefabricated Humanities block was installed in order to cope with an influx of new students arriving from the Swindon area. A further influx of pupils led to the construction of a new Maths block and second sports hall in 2003.

As Greendown Community School, it was judged in 2004 by Ofsted to have serious weaknesses, and put in the category of requiring special measures to improve. In 2005, the school was judged to have improved and was removed from this category.

In September 2014, the Academy introduced a Sixth Form. In 2015, the Academy achieved the highest results in the Swindon area with 67% gaining 5 A* – C (including English and Maths). In 2016 the Academy continued its trend of achieving good results with 68.5% gaining 5 A* – C (including English and Maths). However, the new measure of progress 8 stood at +0.19 which gave it second place in the Swindon league table. This put it in the top 20% of all schools nationally.

=== ASC Centre ===
The school was the second in Swindon to gain a unit for children with forms of autism, the first being Kingsdown. Work started in the summer of 2010 and it finally opened on 5 November 2010. Before this it was held in a room which has now been converted into an ordinary classroom.

=== Specialist status ===
The school was awarded specialist status in 2007 when it was still known as Greendown, and specialised in Sport, Maths, and Computing. With the grant that was awarded, a gym was bought, a new astroturf was constructed, all computers in the school were upgraded and every mathematics classroom received interactive whiteboards.

== Qualifications ==
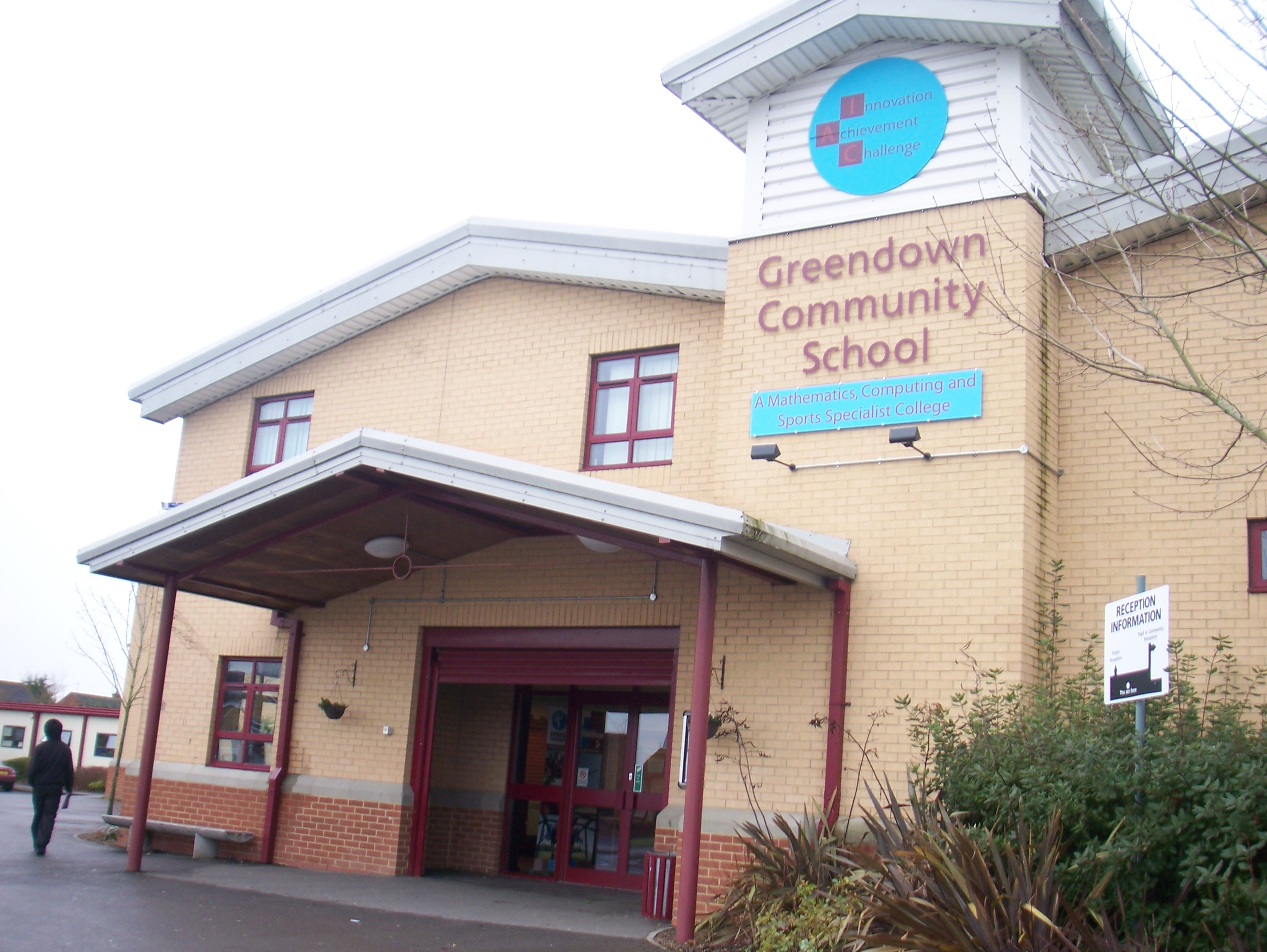
The school entrance in 2010

Lydiard Park Academy teaches a range of GCSEs, BTECs, Cambridge National and Cambridge Technical Level 3 qualifications including:

- Mathematics (KS3, 4 and 5) and Further Mathematics (KS5)
- English Language, English Literature and Media Studies (KS3, 4 and 5)
- Physics, Biology, Chemistry (KS3, 4 and 5)
- Computing and IT (KS3, 4 and 5)
- GCSE and BTEC Physical Education
- GCSE Business and A-level Business, Economics and Cambridge Technical Extended Certificate in Business
- Geography / History / Philosophy and Ethics / Sociology
- Drama / Art Textiles / Art / Music / Music Technology
- Spanish / French (other minor languages are studied by a small number of pupils)
- Food Technology / Photography

== The Park Academies Trust ==
Lydiard Park Academy is the founding member of The Park Academies Trust which was formed in August 2016. In September 2019 another local Swindon secondary school, Abbey Park School, joined the Trust. Red Oaks Primary also joined as of August 2019. Orchid Vale Primary joined in October 2020. Bridlewood Primary School joined in December 2022. In September 2023 Highworth Warneford became the third secondary school to join the Trust.
