= Swindon =

Town in Wiltshire, England

Coordinates: 51.56°N 1.78°W

- Town
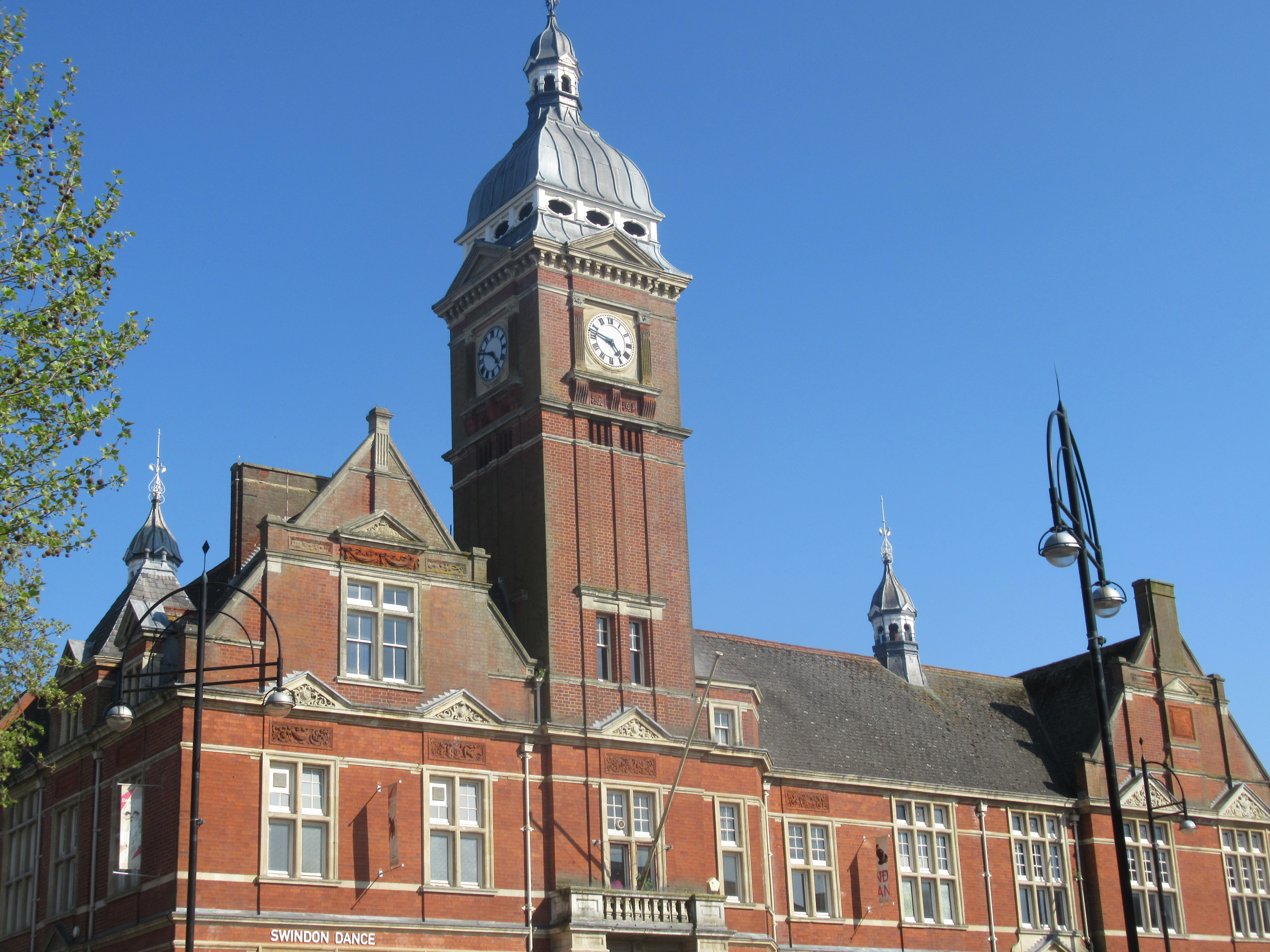
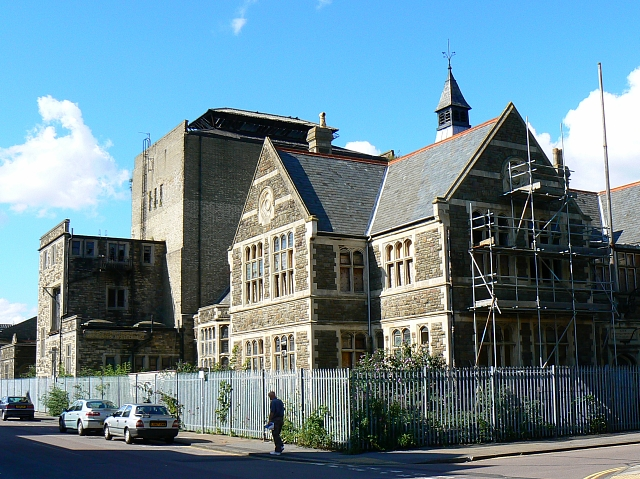
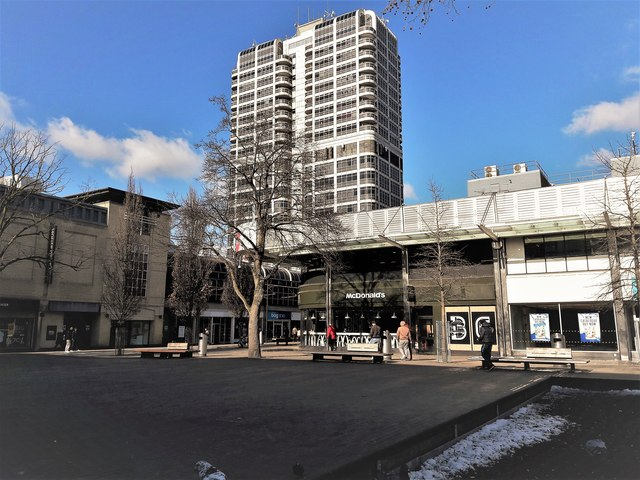
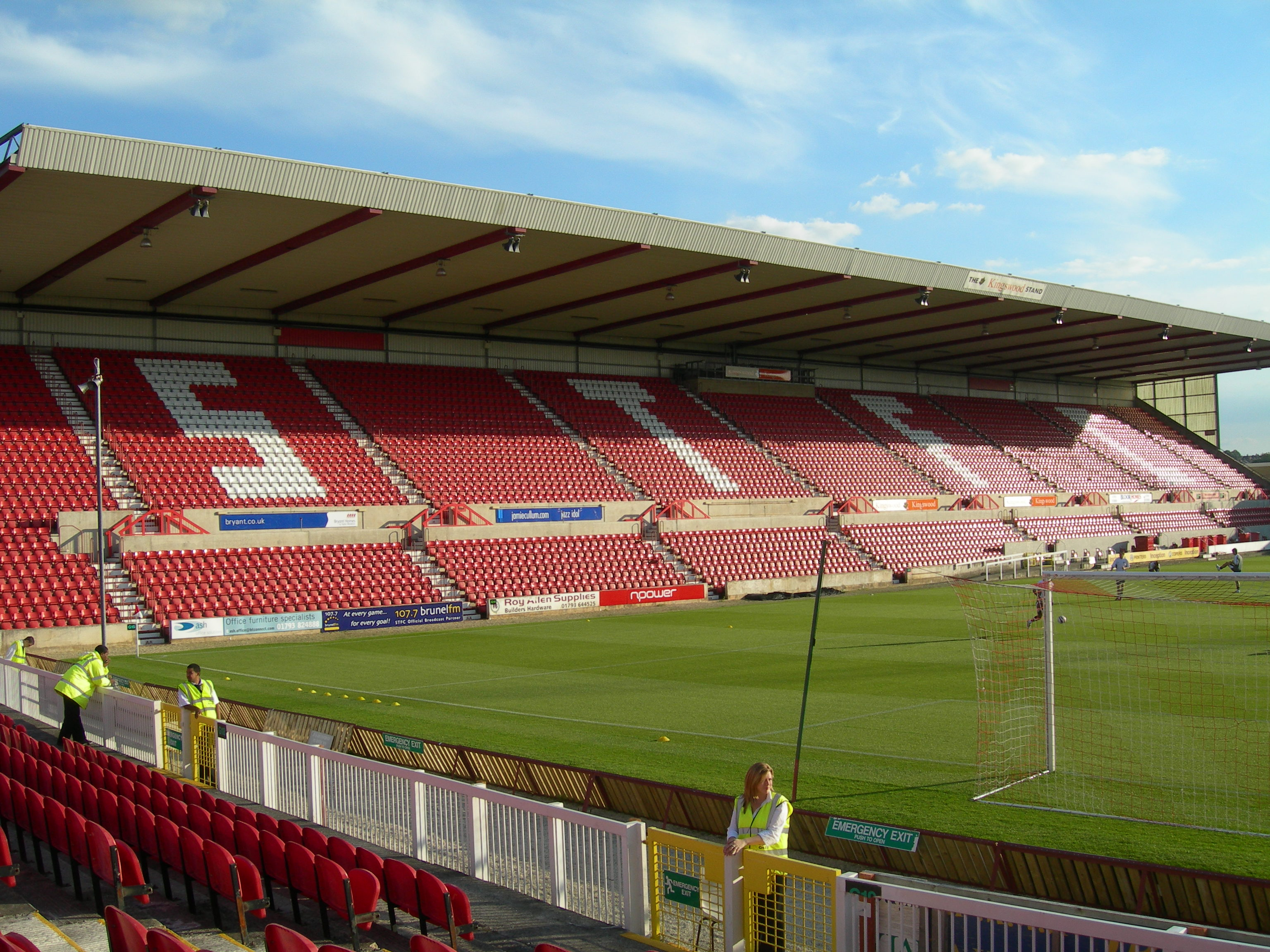
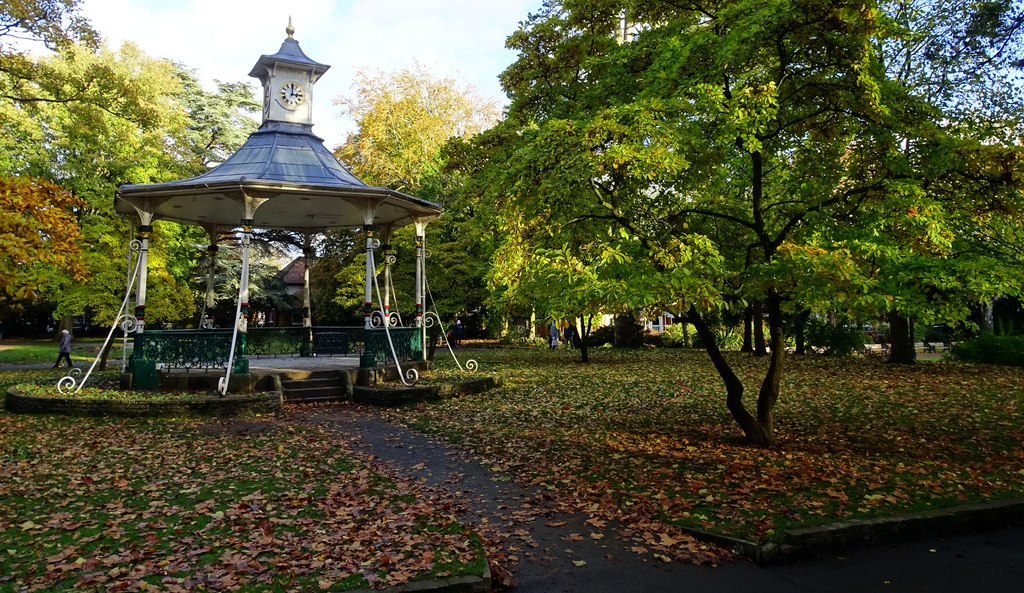
- Town Hall Mechanics' Institute Swindon Town Centre County Ground Town Gardens

- Location within Wiltshire
- Population: 224,942
- Demonym: Swindonian
- OS grid reference: SU152842
  - London: 71 miles (114 km)
- Unitary authority: Swindon
- Ceremonial county: Wiltshire
- Region: South West
- Country: England
- Sovereign state: United Kingdom
- Post town: SWINDON
- Postcode district: SN1–SN6, SN25, SN26
- Dialling code: 01793
- Police: Wiltshire
- Fire: Dorset and Wiltshire
- Ambulance: South Western
- UK Parliament: Swindon North; Swindon South
- Website: swindon.gov.uk

Swindon (/ˈswɪndən/) is a town in Wiltshire, England. At the time of the 2021 census, the population of the built-up area was 224,942, making it the largest settlement in the county. Located at the northeastern edge of the South West England region, Swindon lies on the M4 corridor, 84 miles (135 km) to the west of London and 36 miles (57 km) to the east of Bristol. The Cotswolds lie just to the town's north and the North Wessex Downs lie just to the town's south. It is the centre of Swindon unitary authority.

Recorded in the 1086 Domesday Book as Suindune, the arrival of the Great Western Railway in 1843 transformed it from a small market town of 2,500 into a thriving railway hub that would become one of the largest railway engineering complexes in the world at its peak. This brought with it pioneering amenities such as the UK's first lending library and a 'cradle-to-grave' healthcare centre that was later used as a blueprint for the NHS. Swindon's railway heritage can be primarily seen today with the Grade II listed Railway Village and STEAM Museum. The Swindon Designer Outlet is housed in the renovated former works, and the Brunel Shopping Centre is one of several places in Swindon that bear the name of the famous engineer generally acknowledged with bringing the railways to the town.

Despite the subsequent decline and closure of its railway works, Swindon was one of the fastest growing towns in Europe post-war as its economy diversified, attracting large international companies, who made use of its burgeoning population and strategic transport links.

Major venues in the town include the Wyvern Theatre and the Mechanics' Institute. Lydiard Park has hosted festivals such as BBC Radio 1's Big Weekend, while the Swindon Mela, an all-day celebration of South Indian arts and culture, attracts up to 10,000 visitors a year. The ancient Ridgeway, known as Britain's oldest road, runs a few miles to Swindon's south, with Avebury, the largest megalithic stone circle in the world, and Uffington White Horse, Britain's oldest white horse figure, also nearby. Wiltshire's only professional football club, Swindon Town, have played in the Premier League in the 1993–94 season and won a major trophy, securing a famous giant-killing victory over Arsenal in the 1969 League Cup final. They currently play in League Two at the 15,000-seat County Ground in the town centre. Other sports in the town include Swindon Wildcats Ice Hockey and five-time British speedway champions the Swindon Robins.

== History ==
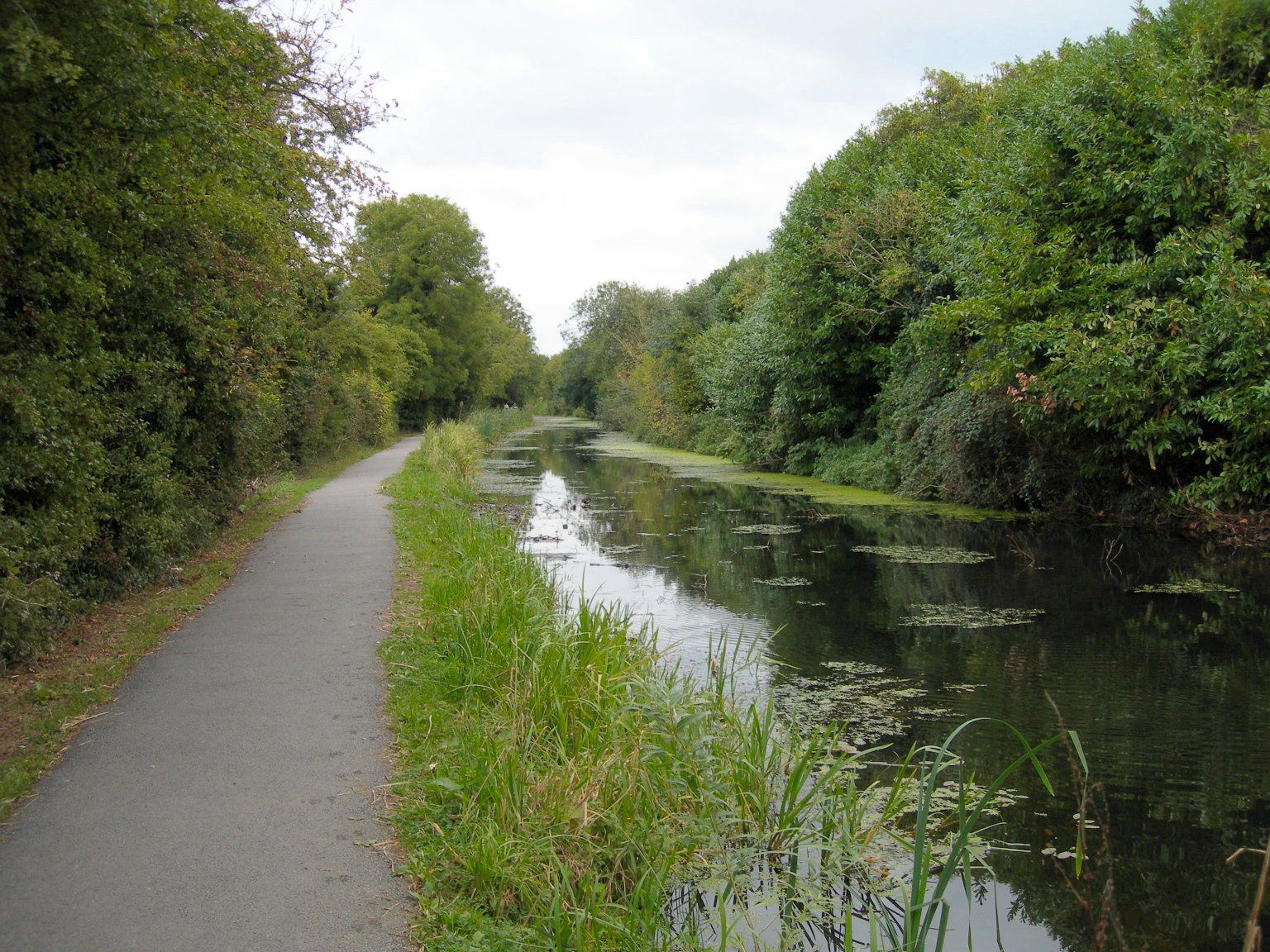
The Wilts & Berks Canal near Rushey Platt

=== Middle Ages ===
The Anglo-Saxon settlement of Swindon sat in a defensible position atop a limestone hill. It is referred to in the 1086 Domesday Book as Suindune, believed to be derived from the Old English words "swine" and "dun" meaning "pig hill" or possibly Sweyn's hill, Sweyn being a Scandinavian name akin to Sven and English swain, meaning a young man.

Swindon is recorded in the Domesday Book as a manor in the hundred of Blagrove, Wiltshire. It was one of the larger manors, recorded as having 27 households and a rent value of £10 14s, which was divided among five landlords. Before the Battle of Hastings the Swindon estate was owned by an Anglo-Saxon thane called Leofgeat. After the Norman Conquest, Swindon was split into five holdings: the largest was held between Miles Crispin and Odin the Chamberlain, and the second by Wadard, a knight in the service of Odo of Bayeux, brother of the king. The manors of Westlecot, Walcot, Rodbourne, Moredon and Stratton are also listed; all are now part of Swindon.

The Goddard family were lord of the manor from the 16th century for many generations, living at the manor house, sometimes known as The Lawn.

Swindon was a small market town, mainly for barter trade, until roughly 1848. This original market area is on top of the hill in central Swindon, now known as Old Town.

The Industrial Revolution was responsible for an acceleration of Swindon's growth. Construction of the Wilts and Berks Canal in 1810 and the North Wilts Canal in 1819 brought trade to the area, and Swindon's population started to grow.

=== Railway town ===
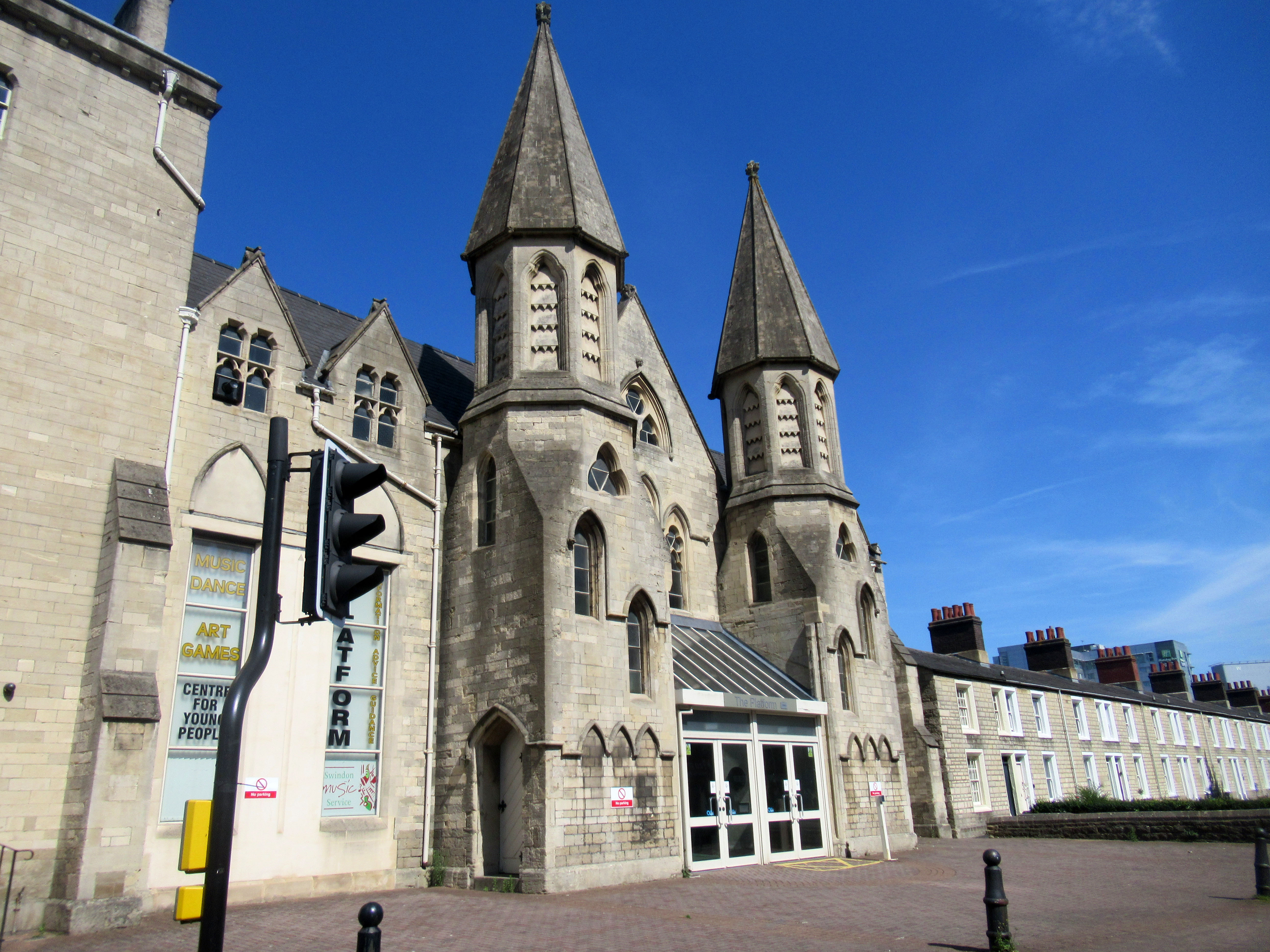
Former lodging house in the Railway Village, now a community centre

Between 1841 and 1842, Isambard Kingdom Brunel's Swindon Works was built for the repair and maintenance of locomotives on the Great Western Railway (GWR). The GWR built a small railway village to house some of its workers. The Museum of the Great Western Railway and English Heritage, including the English Heritage Archive, now occupy part of the old works. In the village were the GWR Medical Fund Clinic at Park House and its hospital, both on Faringdon Road, and the 1892 health centre in Milton Road, which housed clinics, a pharmacy, laundries, baths, Victorian Turkish baths and swimming pools, which were almost opposite.

From 1871, GWR workers had a small amount deducted from their weekly pay and put into a healthcare fund; GWR doctors could prescribe them or their family members medicines or send them for medical treatment. In 1878 the fund began providing artificial limbs made by craftsmen from the carriage and wagon works, and nine years later opened its first dental surgery. In his first few months in post, the dentist extracted more than 2,000 teeth. From the opening in 1892 of the health centre, a doctor could also prescribe a haircut or even a bath. The cradle-to-grave extent of this service was later used as a blueprint for the NHS.

The Mechanics' Institute, formed in 1844, moved into a building that looked rather like a church and included a covered market on 1 May 1855. The New Swindon Improvement Company, a co-operative, raised the funds for this programme of self-improvement and paid the GWR £40 a year for its new home on a site at the heart of the railway village. It was a groundbreaking organisation that transformed the railway's workforce into some of the country's best-educated manual workers.

The Mechanics' Institute had the UK's first lending library, put on a range of improving lectures, and arranged various other activities such as access to a theatre, ambulance classes and xylophone lessons. A former institute secretary formed the New Swindon Co-operative Society in 1853, which, after a schism in the society's membership, spawned the New Swindon Industrial Society, which ran a retail business from a stall in the market at the institute. The institute also nurtured pioneering trade unionists and encouraged local democracy.

When tuberculosis hit the new town, the Mechanics' Institute persuaded the industrial pioneers of North Wiltshire to agree that the railway's former employees should continue to receive medical attention from the doctors of the GWR Medical Society Fund, which the institute had played a role in establishing and funding.

In 1874, a skeleton of the stegosaurian dinosaur Dacentrurus was excavated from Swindon Great Quarry.

Swindon's other railway, the Swindon, Marlborough and Andover Railway, merged with the Swindon and Cheltenham Extension Railway to form the Midland & South Western Junction Railway, which set out to join the London & South Western Railway with the Midland Railway at Cheltenham. The Swindon, Marlborough & Andover had planned to tunnel under the hill on which Swindon's Old Town stands but the money ran out and the railway ran into Swindon Town railway station, off Devizes Road in the Old Town, skirting the new town to the west, intersecting with the GWR at Rushey Platt and heading north for Cirencester, Cheltenham and the LMS, whose 'Midland Red' livery the M&SWJR adopted.

During the second half of the 19th century, Swindon New Town grew around the main line between London and Bristol. In 1900, the original market town, Old Swindon, merged with its new neighbour at the bottom of the hill to become a single town.

On 1 July 1923, the GWR took over the largely single-track M&SWJR and the line northwards from Swindon Town was diverted to Swindon Junction station, leaving the Town station with only the line south to Andover and Salisbury. The last passenger trains on what had been the SM&A ran on 10 September 1961, 80 years after the railway's first stretch opened.

During the first half of the 20th century, the railway works was the town's largest employer and one of the biggest in the country, employing more than 14,500. Alfred Williams (1877–1930) wrote about his life as a hammerman at the works.

The works' decline started in 1960, when it rolled out Evening Star, the last steam locomotive to be built in the UK. The works lost its locomotive-building role and took on rolling stock maintenance for British Rail. In the late 1970s, much of the works closed, and the rest followed in 1986.

The community centre in the railway village was originally the barracks accommodation for railway employees of the GWR. The building became the Railway Museum in the 1960s, until the opening of 'STEAM – Museum of the Great Western Railway' in the 2000s.

=== Modern period ===
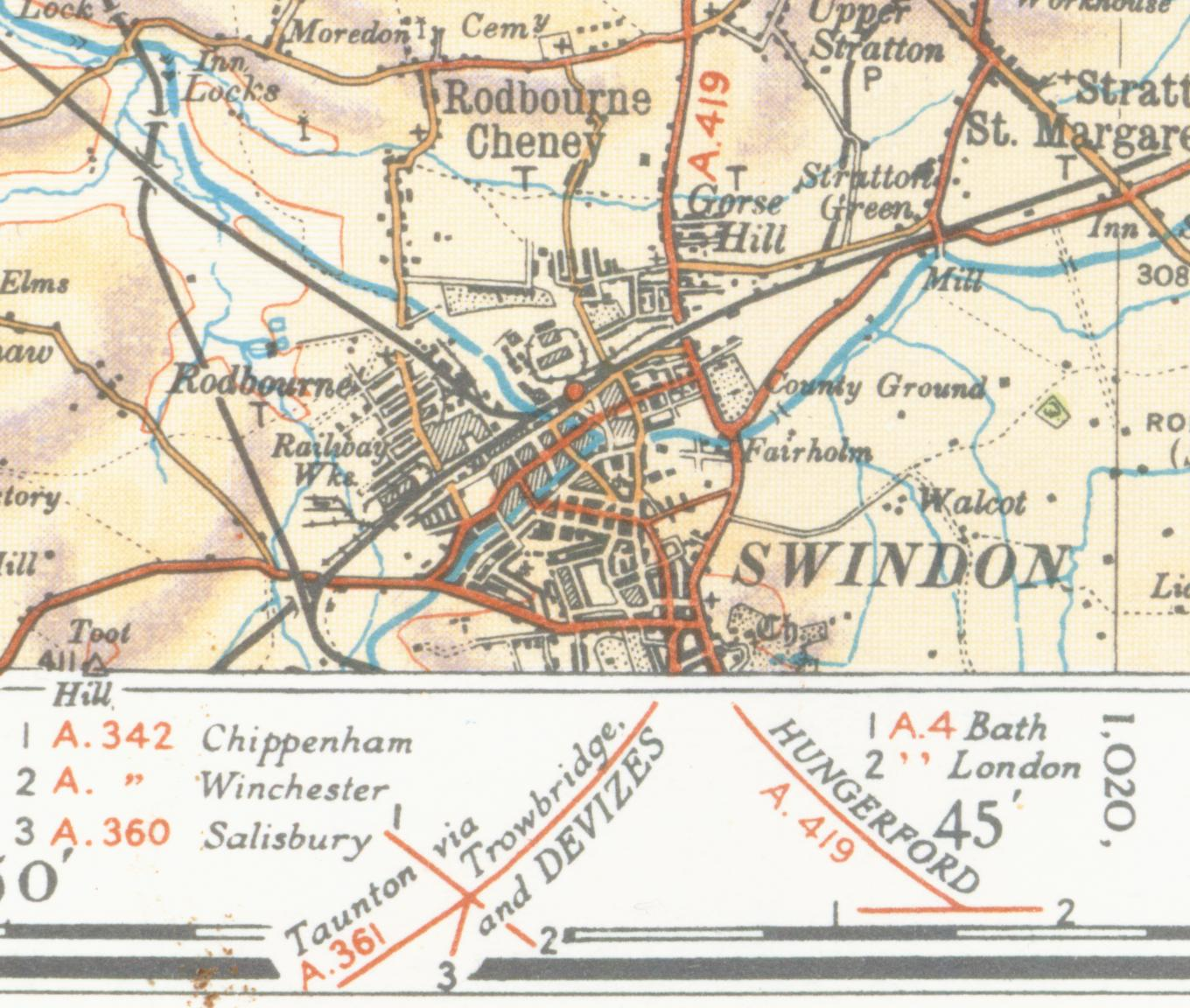
Swindon in 1933

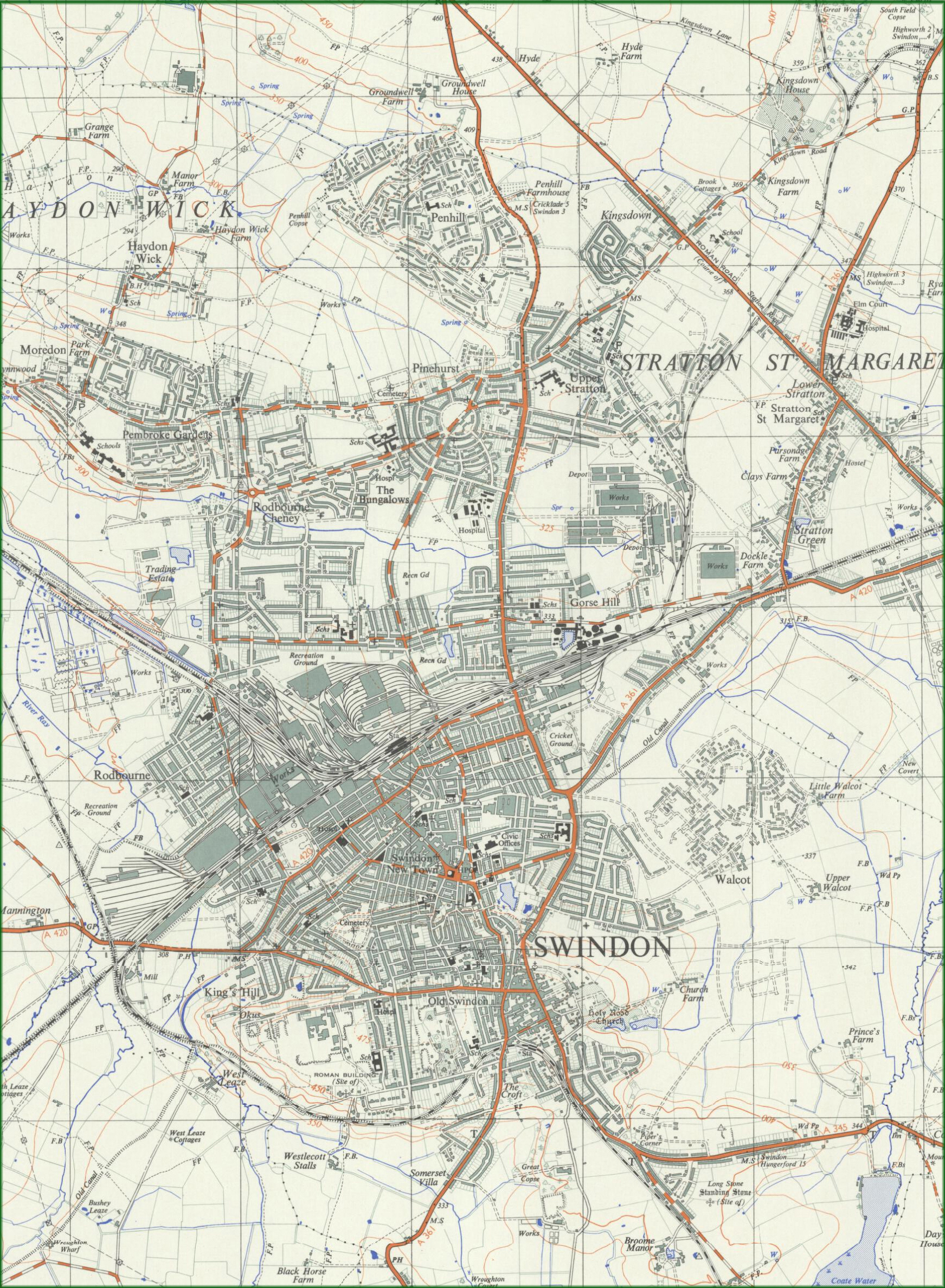
Swindon in 1959. Grid squares are 1 km (0.62 mi).

The Second World War saw an influx of new industries as part of the war effort; Vickers-Armstrong making aircraft at Stratton, and Plessey at Cheney Manor producing electrical components. By 1960, Plessey had become Swindon's biggest employer, with a predominantly female workforce.

David Murray John, Swindon's town clerk from 1938 to 1974, is seen as a pioneering figure in Swindon's post-war regeneration: his last act before retirement was to sign the contract for Swindon's tallest building, which is now named after him. Murray John's successor was David Maxwell Kent, appointed by the Swindon/Highworth Joint Committee in 1973: he had worked closely with Murray John and continued similar policies for a further twenty years. The Greater London Council withdrew from the Town Development Agreement, and the local council continued the development on its own.

There was the problem of the Western Development and of Lydiard Park being in the new North Wiltshire district, but this was resolved by a boundary change to take in part of North Wiltshire. Another factor limiting local decision-making was the continuing role of Wiltshire County Council in the administration of Swindon. Together with like-minded councils, a campaign was launched to bring an updated form of county borough status to Swindon. This was successful in 1997 with the formation of Swindon Borough Council, covering the areas of the former Thamesdown and the former Highworth Rural District Council.

In February 2008, The Times named Swindon as one of "The 20 best places to buy a property in Britain". Only Warrington had a lower ratio of house prices to household income in 2007, with the average household income in Swindon among the highest in the country.

In October 2008, Swindon Council made a controversial move to ban fixed point speed cameras. The move was branded as reckless by some, but by November 2008 Portsmouth, Walsall, and Birmingham councils were also considering the move.

In 2001, construction began on Priory Vale, the third and final instalment in Swindon's 'Northern Expansion' project, which began with Abbey Meads and continued at St Andrew's Ridge. In 2002, the New Swindon Company was formed with the remit of regenerating the town centre, to improve Swindon's regional status. The main areas targeted were Union Square, The Promenade, The Hub, Swindon Central, North Star Village, The Campus, and the Public Realm.

In August 2019, a secondary school in the town was at the centre of a 'county lines' drug supply investigation by Wiltshire Police, with 40 pupils suspected of being involved in the supply of cannabis and cocaine, and girls as young as 14 being coerced into sexual activity in exchange for drugs.

== Geography ==
Swindon is a town in northeast Wiltshire, 35 miles (56 km) west-northwest of Reading and the same distance east-northeast of Bristol 'as the crow flies'. The town is also 26 miles (42 km) southwest of Oxford, 65 miles (105 km) south-southeast of Birmingham, 71 miles (114 km) west of London and 60 miles (97 km) east of Cardiff. Swindon town centre is also equidistant from the county boundaries of Berkshire and Gloucestershire, both being 8 miles (13 km) away. The border with Oxfordshire is slightly closer, being around 5 miles (8 km) away.

Swindon is within a landlocked county and is a considerable distance from any coastline. The nearest section of coast on the English Channel is near Christchurch, 56 miles (90 km) due south. Meanwhile, the eastern limit of the Bristol Channel, just north of Weston-super-mare, lies 53 miles (85 km) to the west.

The landscape is dominated by the chalk hills of the Wiltshire Downs to the south and east. The Old Town stands on a hill of Purbeck and Portland stone; this was quarried from Roman times until the 1950s. The area that was known as New Swindon is made up of mostly Kimmeridge clay with outcrops of Corrallian clay in the areas of Penhill and Pinehurst. Oxford clay makes up the rest of the borough. The River Ray rises at Wroughton and forms much of the borough's western boundary, joining the Thames which defines the northern boundary, and the source of which is located in nearby Kemble, Gloucestershire. The River Cole and its tributaries flow northeastward from the town and form the northeastern boundary.

- Nearby towns: Calne, Chippenham, Royal Wootton Bassett, Cirencester, Cricklade, Devizes, Highworth, Marlborough, Witney and Malmesbury
- Nearby villages: Badbury, Blunsdon, Broad Hinton, Chiseldon, Hook, Liddington, Lydiard Millicent, Lyneham, Minety, Purton, South Marston, Wanborough, Wroughton
- Nearby places of interest: Avebury, Barbury Castle, Crofton Pumping Station, Lydiard Country Park, Silbury Hill, Stonehenge, Uffington White Horse
- Sites of Special Scientific Interest in Swindon include Coate Water, Great Quarry, Haydon Meadow, Okus Quarry and Old Town Railway Cutting

=== Climate ===
Swindon has an oceanic climate (Cfb in the Köppen climate classification), like the vast majority of the British Isles, with cool winters and warm summers. The nearest official weather station is RAF Lyneham, about 10 miles (16 km) west southwest of Swindon town centre. The weather station's elevation is 145 metres (476 ft) in a rural setting, compared to the typical 100 metres (330 ft) encountered around Swindon town centre, so it is likely marginally cooler throughout the year.

The absolute maximum is 34.9 °C (94.8 °F), recorded during August 1990. In an average year the warmest day should reach 28.7 °C (83.7 °F) and 10.3 days should register a temperature of 25.1 °C (77.2 °F) or above.

The absolute minimum is −16.0 °C (3.2 °F), recorded in January 1982, and in an average year 45.2 nights of air frost can be expected.

Sunshine, at 1,565 hours a year, is typical for inland parts of Southern England, although significantly higher than most areas further north.

Annual rainfall averages slightly under 720 mm (28 in) per year, with 123 days reporting over 1 mm (0.039 in) of rain.

Climate data for Lyneham, (Note: Weather station is located 10.0 miles (16.1 km) from the Swindon city centre.) elevation 145 m (476 ft), (1991–2020 normals, extremes 1957–present)
| Month | Jan | Feb | Mar | Apr | May | Jun | Jul | Aug | Sep | Oct | Nov | Dec | Year |
|---|---|---|---|---|---|---|---|---|---|---|---|---|---|
| Record high °C (°F) | 13.7 (56.7) | 18.1 (64.6) | 21.1 (70.0) | 25.3 (77.5) | 26.6 (79.9) | 32.7 (90.9) | 34.9 (94.8) | 34.9 (94.8) | 29.5 (85.1) | 26.5 (79.7) | 17.2 (63.0) | 14.7 (58.5) | 34.9 (94.8) |
| Mean daily maximum °C (°F) | 7.2 (45.0) | 7.7 (45.9) | 10.2 (50.4) | 13.2 (55.8) | 16.4 (61.5) | 19.4 (66.9) | 21.5 (70.7) | 21.0 (69.8) | 18.3 (64.9) | 14.2 (57.6) | 10.1 (50.2) | 7.5 (45.5) | 13.9 (57.0) |
| Daily mean °C (°F) | 4.5 (40.1) | 4.7 (40.5) | 6.6 (43.9) | 9.0 (48.2) | 12.0 (53.6) | 14.9 (58.8) | 17.0 (62.6) | 16.7 (62.1) | 14.3 (57.7) | 10.9 (51.6) | 7.3 (45.1) | 4.8 (40.6) | 10.2 (50.4) |
| Mean daily minimum °C (°F) | 1.7 (35.1) | 1.6 (34.9) | 3.0 (37.4) | 4.7 (40.5) | 7.5 (45.5) | 10.4 (50.7) | 12.4 (54.3) | 12.3 (54.1) | 10.2 (50.4) | 7.6 (45.7) | 4.4 (39.9) | 2.1 (35.8) | 6.5 (43.7) |
| Record low °C (°F) | −16.0 (3.2) | −11.3 (11.7) | −8.0 (17.6) | −4.8 (23.4) | −1.6 (29.1) | 0.6 (33.1) | 3.8 (38.8) | 5.0 (41.0) | 1.5 (34.7) | −3.6 (25.5) | −7.8 (18.0) | −14.0 (6.8) | −16.0 (3.2) |
| Average precipitation mm (inches) | 76.7 (3.02) | 56.0 (2.20) | 51.9 (2.04) | 52.7 (2.07) | 57.8 (2.28) | 54.9 (2.16) | 60.2 (2.37) | 65.6 (2.58) | 55.1 (2.17) | 79.5 (3.13) | 82.0 (3.23) | 78.6 (3.09) | 771 (30.34) |
| Average precipitation days (≥ 1.0 mm) | 13.0 | 10.9 | 9.9 | 10.1 | 9.8 | 9.3 | 9.7 | 10.2 | 9.7 | 12.4 | 13.4 | 13.3 | 131.7 |
| Mean monthly sunshine hours | 60.6 | 78.9 | 124.5 | 172.9 | 210.9 | 205.2 | 215.2 | 192.7 | 154.1 | 112.9 | 70.7 | 54.4 | 1,653 |
Source 1: Met Office
Source 2: Starlings Roost Weather

== Demographics ==
=== Ethnicity ===
The population of the Borough of Swindon was historically ethnically homogeneous, White British, but is now becoming less homogeneous, with the largest ethnic group, White British, constituting 74.2% of the population in the 2021 census. This proportion has consistently declined in each modern census, down from 91.5% in the 2001 census.

In the 2021 census, the ethnic composition of the Borough of Swindon comprised: 81.5% White, 11.6% Asian, 2.6% Black, 2.8% Mixed, and 1.5% Other.

- White (81.5%): English, Welsh, Scottish, Northern Irish or British (74.2%), Irish (0.7%), Gypsy or Irish Traveller (0.1%), Roma (0.2%), and Other White (6.3%).
- Asian (11.6%): Indian (7.6%), Pakistani (0.9%), Bangladeshi (0.6%), Chinese (0.5%), and Other Asian (2.1%).
- Black (2.6%): African (1.8%), Caribbean (0.4%), and Other Black (0.4%).
- Mixed (2.8%): White and Asian (0.7%), White and Black African (0.5%), White and Black Caribbean (0.8%), and Other Mixed or Multiple ethnic groups (0.8%).
- Other (1.5%): Arab (0.1%) and Any other ethnic group (1.3%).

Note: Sub-group totals may not sum exactly to the group total due to rounding.

Ethnic groups in the Borough of Swindon
| Ethnic Group | 2001 Census | 2011 Census | 2021 Census | | | | |
|---|---|---|---|---|---|---|---|
| Ethnic Group | 2001 Census | 2011 Census | 2021 Census | White | 95.2% | 89.8% | 81.5% |
| Asian | 2.6% | 6.4% | 11.6% | | | | |
| Black | 0.7% | 1.4% | 2.6% | | | | |
| Mixed | 1.1% | 2.0% | 2.8% | | | | |
| Other | 0.4% | 0.4% | 1.5% | | | | |

Note: The 2001 census figures for 'Asian' and 'Other' have been adjusted to reflect the 2011 reclassification of the Chinese ethnic group from 'Other' to 'Asian' to allow comparison across census years.

=== Religion ===
Religion in the Borough of Swindon (2021 United Kingdom census)
1. Christian (46.6%)
2. No religion (40.5%)
3. Muslim (2.70%)
4. Hindu (2.50%)
5. Buddhist (0.70%)
6. Sikh (0.60%)
7. Jewish (0.10%)
8. Other religion (0.60%)
9. Not stated (5.60%)

In the 2021 census, the religious composition of the Borough of Swindon comprised: 46.6% Christian, 40.5% No religion, 2.7% Muslim, 2.5% Hindu, 0.7% Buddhist, 0.6% Sikh, 0.1% Jewish, 0.6% Other religion, and 5.6% Not stated.

Religion in the Borough of Swindon
| Religion | 2001 Census | 2011 Census | 2021 Census | | | | |
|---|---|---|---|---|---|---|---|
| Religion | 2001 Census | 2011 Census | 2021 Census | Christian | 70.1% | 57.5% | 46.6% |
| No religion | 19.1% | 31.0% | 40.5% | | | | |
| Muslim | 1.0% | 1.7% | 2.7% | | | | |
| Hindu | 0.6% | 1.2% | 2.5% | | | | |
| Buddhist | 0.3% | 0.6% | 0.7% | | | | |
| Sikh | 0.6% | 0.6% | 0.6% | | | | |
| Jewish | 0.1% | 0.1% | 0.1% | | | | |
| Other religion | 0.4% | 0.5% | 0.6% | | | | |
| Not stated | 7.9% | 6.8% | 5.6% | | | | |

=== Demographic overview by area ===
There are several definitions of the town for statistical purposes. The smallest extent is the former unparished area, now covered by the parishes of West Swindon, Central Swindon North, South Swindon, and Nythe, Eldene and Liden; thus it omits suburbs to the east and north, namely the parishes of Covingham, Stratton St Margaret and Haydon Wick. At the 2011 census, the population of the unparished area was 122,642. The 2011 census also recognised a Built Up Area Subdivision with a population of 182,441.

At the 2021 census, the only area covering most of the town was the Built Up Area, which had a population of 183,638. Excluded from this were the parts of Wichelstowe lying in Wroughton parish, the whole of Stratton St Margaret parish, and northern parts of St Andrews parish.

=== St Helena community ===
By 2018, Swindon had a concentration of people originating from Saint Helena. Among that community, Swindon is called "Swindolena".

=== Polish community ===
After the end of World War II, Polish refugees were temporarily housed in barracks at RAF Fairford, about 25 km (16 mi) to the north. Around 1950, some settled in Scotland and others in Swindon rather than stay in the barracks or hostels they were offered.

The 2001 UK Census found that most of the Polish-born people had stayed or returned after serving with British forces during World War II. Swindon and Nottingham were parts of this settlement. Data from that census showed that 566 Swindonians were Polish-born. Notes to those data read: "The Polish Resettlement Act of 1947, which was designed to provide help and support to people who wished to settle here, covered about 190,000 people ... at the time Britain did not recognise many of the professional [qualifications] gained overseas ... [but] many did find work after the war; some went down the mines, some worked on the land or in steelworks. Housing was more of a problem, and many Poles were forced to live in barracks previously used for POWs ... The first generation took pains to ensure that their children grew up with a strong sense of Polish identity".

NHS planners devising services for senior citizens estimated in 1994 that 5% of Swindon's population were not 'ethnically British', and most of those were culturally Polish.

The town's Polish ex-servicemen's club, which had run a football team for 45 years, closed in 2012. Barman Jerzy Trojan blamed the decline of both club and team on the children and grandchildren of the original refugees losing their Polish identity.

=== Goan community ===
Swindon has a large community of Goan people. Estimates for the total number of Goans in Swindon range from 8,000 to 25,000; in 1999 there were estimated to be only 40 Goan people in the town. In 2013, Swindon was reported to have the highest concentration of Goans anywhere in the world outside of Goa.

The Goan population is concentrated in the Town Centre area, including Gorse Hill and Eastcott, as well as in Broadgreen. Most of the Goan community are Goan Catholics and have Portuguese nationality due to their ancestry in Portuguese Goa. The Catholic community is served by Holy Rood Catholic Church in the town centre and St Peter's Church in West Swindon, and supported by the Goan Chaplaincy. Services are regularly carried out in Konkani. The Anglican St Luke's Church also carries out Mass in Konkani, believed to be the only Mass regularly carried out in this language in the Church of England.

The Goa Swindon Association supports members of the community. It is involved in promoting and introducing Goan culture, such as tiatrs (Konkani theatre), the annual Goan Summer Festival, and Konkani musical shows, among others.

Among the notable Goans based in Swindon is Imtiyaz Shaikh, who served as Mayor of Swindon between May 2024 and May 2025. He is a three-term councillor on Swindon Borough Council.

== Governance ==
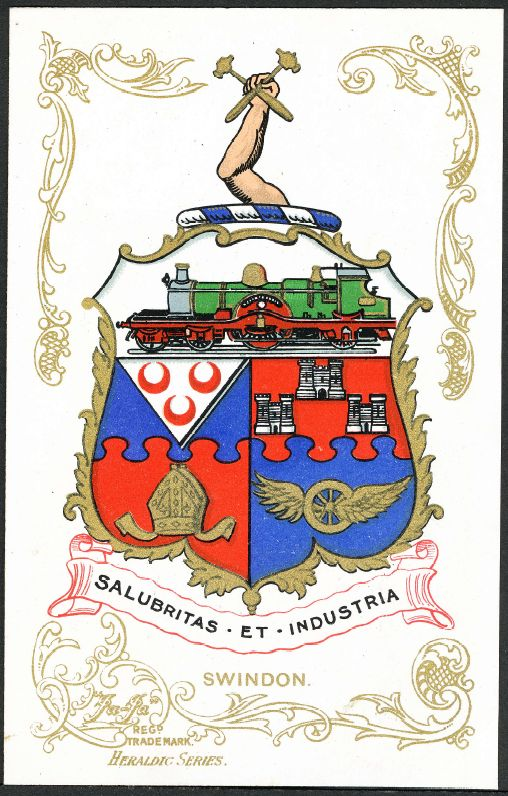
The Borough of Swindon arms on an early 20th century postcard

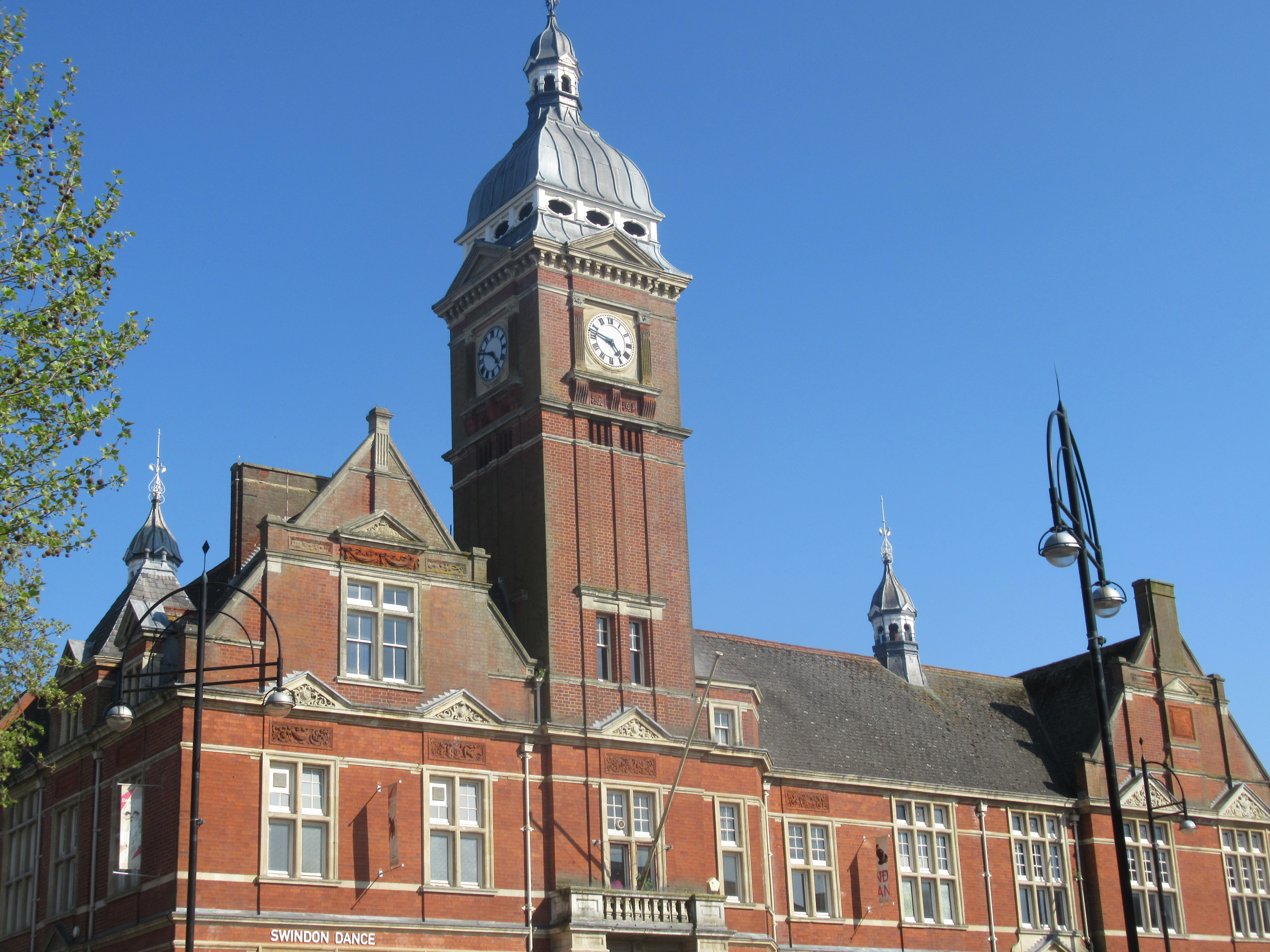
Swindon Town Hall, now a dance theatre

The local council was created in 1974 as the Borough of Thamesdown, out of the areas of Swindon Borough and Highworth Rural District. It was not initially called Swindon because the borough covers a larger area than the town; it was renamed the Borough of Swindon in 1997. The borough became a unitary authority on 1 April 1997, following a review by the Local Government Commission for England. The town is therefore no longer under the auspices of Wiltshire Council.

Council elections are held in three out of every four years, with one-third of the seats up for election in each of those years; beginning in 2026, the whole council will be elected every four years. Labour gained control of the council from the Conservatives at the 2023 election, and increased their majority in 2024.

Swindon is represented in the national parliament by two MPs. Heidi Alexander (Labour) was elected for the Swindon South seat in July 2024 with a 16% swing from the Conservatives. Will Stone, also Labour, represents Swindon North – which covers the whole of the north of the borough, including Blunsdon and Highworth – after a 19% swing at the same election. Prior to 1997 there was a single seat for Swindon, although much of what is now in Swindon was then part of the Devizes seat.

== Places of worship ==
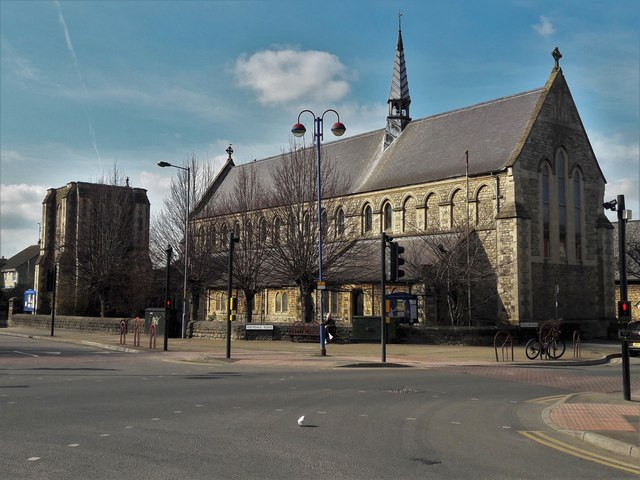
St Barnabas, Gorse Hill

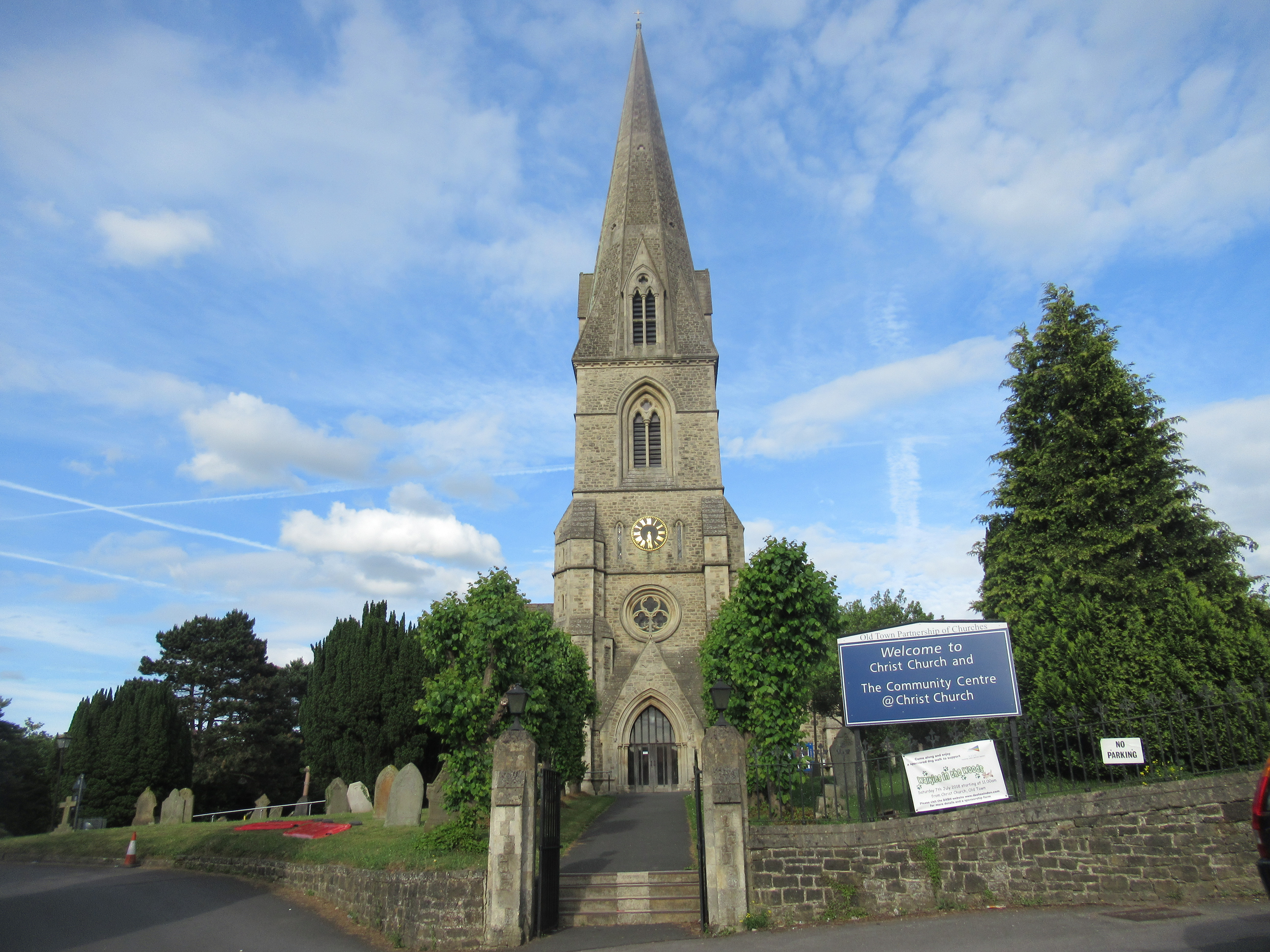
Christ Church (Church of England), designed by Sir George Gilbert Scott

There are numerous places of worship in Swindon, some of which are listed buildings. Until 1845, the only church in Swindon was the Holy Rood Church, a Grade II listed building. That year, St Mark's Church was built. In 1851, Christ Church was built. Later in the year, the first Roman Catholic chapel was opened in the town and was also named Holy Rood. In 1866, Cambria Baptist Chapel was built. In the 1880s, Bath Road Methodist Chapel was built. In 1885, St Barnabas Church was built, followed by the Baptists Tabernacle (1886–1978). In 1907, St Augustine's Church in Even Swindon was built. Various churches and places of worship were built in the town by other denominations and faiths. Pattern Church was launched on Christmas 2018, on the site of the former Pattern Store.

== Economy ==
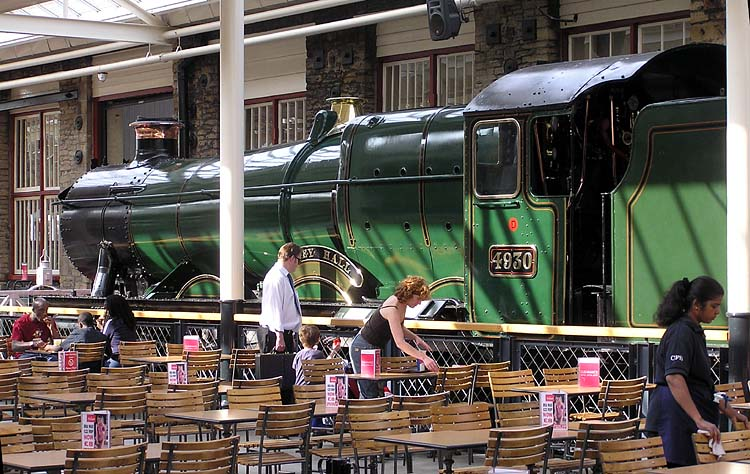
Hagley Hall, a Swindon-built locomotive, on display in the eating area of the McArthur Glen Designer Outlet, Swindon

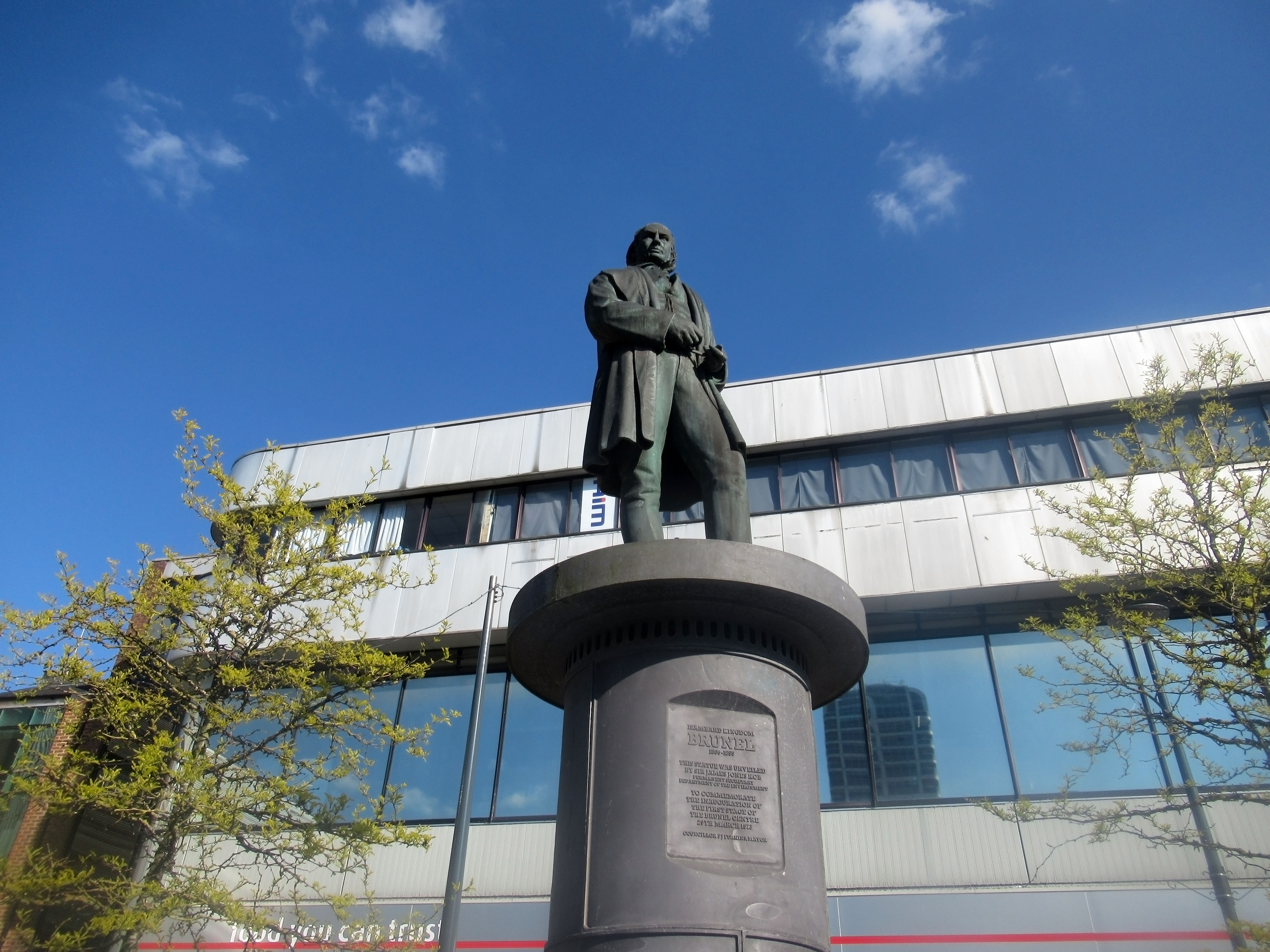
Havelock Square, near the Brunel Centre

Major employers in the town include BMW/Mini (formerly Pressed Steel Fisher) in Stratton, Dolby Labs, international engineering consultancy firm Halcrow, and retailer W H Smith's distribution centre and headquarters. Electronics company Intel, insurance and financial services companies such as Nationwide Building Society and Zurich Financial Services, the energy companies RWE Generation UK plc and Npower (a company of the Innogy group), the fleet management company Arval, pharmaceutical companies such as Canada's Patheon and the United States–based Catalent Pharma Solutions and French medical supplies manufacturer Vygon (UK) have their UK divisions headquartered in the town.

Swindon also has the head office of the National Trust and the head office of the UK Space Agency. Other employers include all of the national Research Councils, the British Computer Society, and TE Connectivity.

From 1985 to 2021, Japanese car manufacturer Honda had its sole UK plant at South Marston, just outside Swindon. In March 2021, it was announced that logistics firm Panattoni would move to the former Honda site.

Swindon was for a time a centre of excellence for 3G and 4G mobile telecommunications research and development for Motorola, Lucent Technologies (later Alcatel-Lucent), Nokia Siemens Networks and Cisco. The factory built in 1998 for Motorola's GSM division at Groundwell, north Swindon, has been described as "striking and futuristic".

== Transport ==
=== Railway ===
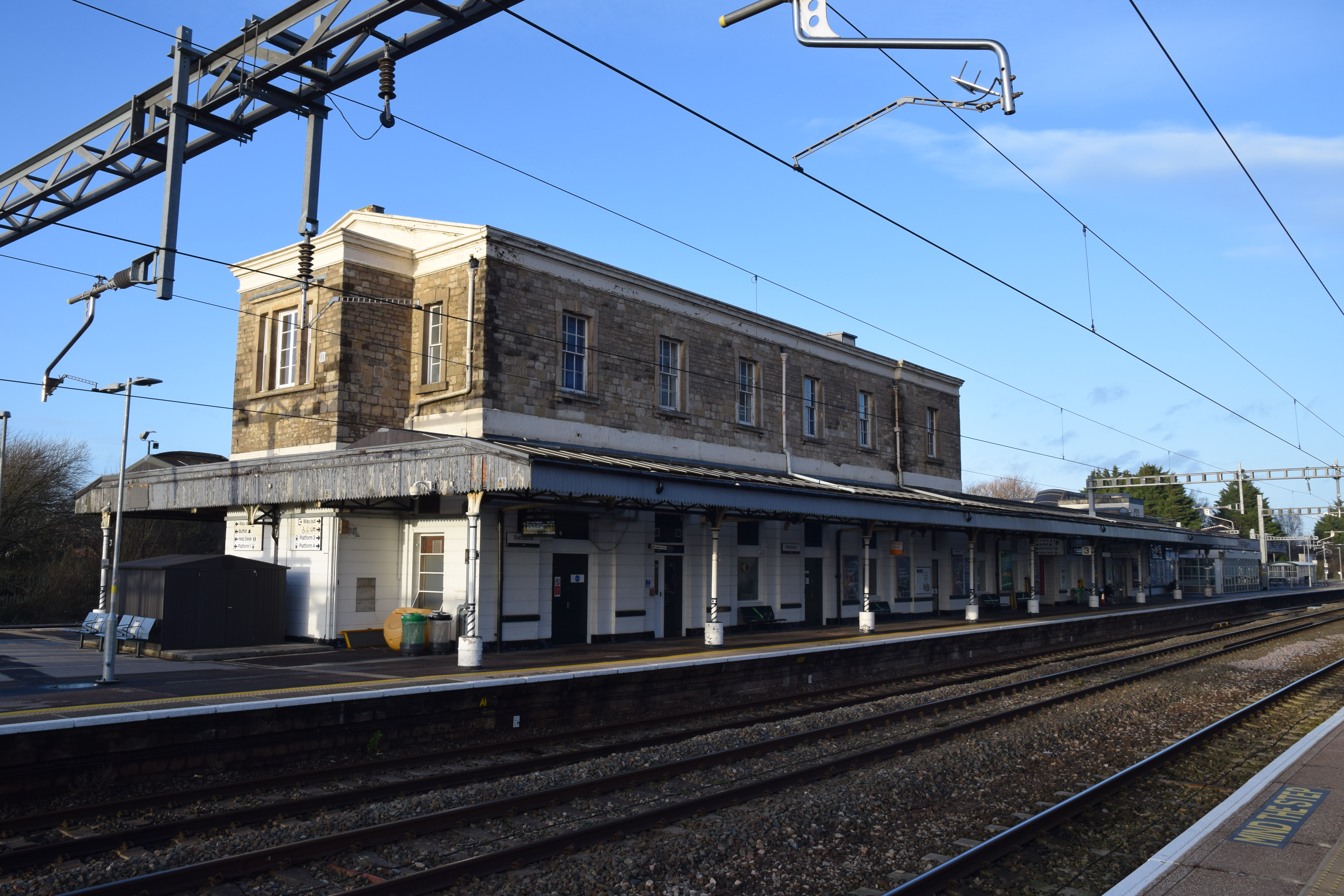
Swindon station

Swindon is an important railway town. Swindon railway station opened in 1842 as Swindon Junction and, until 1895, every train stopped for at least ten minutes to change locomotives. As a result, the station hosted the first recorded railway refreshment rooms.

The station is served by frequent inter-city trains to London Paddington eastbound, and westbound to Bristol Temple Meads, Cheltenham Spa and Cardiff Central, along the Great Western Main Line and Golden Valley line. There is also a local service to Westbury, via the Wessex Main Line. All services at Swindon are operated by Great Western Railway.

On 8 October 2019, GWR posted a modern speed record when an Intercity Express Train took 44 minutes to travel from Swindon to London Paddington.

=== Road ===
Swindon's Magic Roundabout

Located at the junction of two Roman roads, the town has developed into a transport hub over the centuries. It is accessed by two junctions (15 and 16) on the M4 motorway.

The town's Magic Roundabout, at the junction of five roads, contains five mini-roundabouts and has a contra-rotational hub at its centre. It is built on the site of Swindon Wharf on the abandoned Wilts & Berks Canal, near the County Ground. The official name was County Islands, although it was known colloquially as the Magic Roundabout and the official name was changed to match its nickname.

=== Bus and coach ===
Swindon bus operators are Swindon's Bus Company (formerly Thamesdown) and Stagecoach West. Key routes link the town with Cheltenham, Chippenham, Cirencester, Devizes and Trowbridge. National Express coaches use the bus interchange at Fleming Way in the town centre.

Stagecoach's former bus depot on Eastcott Road was approved for development as a housing site in 2018.

=== Cycling ===
National Cycle Network Route 45 runs through the town.

== Tourism and recreation ==
=== Events ===
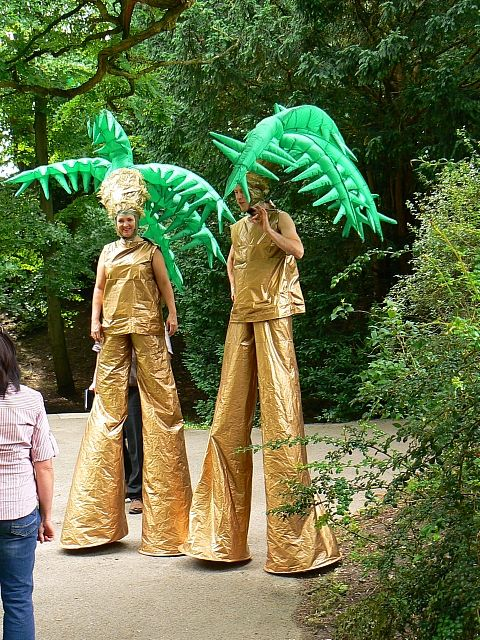
Swindon Mela in the Town Gardens

Annual events in Swindon include:

- The Swindon Festival of Literature, held over two weeks in May.
- The Swindon Mela, an all-day celebration of South Indian arts and culture in the Town Gardens, which attracts up to 10,000 visitors each year.
- The Children's Fete, a town-wide event in celebration of Swindon's children, community, culture, and heritage, is usually held the first Saturday in July.
- The Summer Breeze Festival has been held annually in the town since 2007. The family-friendly music event is run by volunteers on a non-profit basis with any funds raised going to charity.
- An annual Gay Pride Parade called Swindon And Wiltshire Pride is held in the town. The parade has been held in the Town Gardens since 2007. Swedish DJ Basshunter performed in the 2012 celebrations, with around 8,000 people attending.
- The Swindon Beer Festival, Organised by the local branch of the Campaign for Real Ale (CAMRA), is held at the STEAM museum in October each year. There is also an Old Town Beer Festival held in Christ Church.
- Swindon Open Studios, held over two weekends every September; local artists open their studios to visitors or take part in group exhibitions around the town.
- The Swindon Half Marathon is held in September.

=== Theatre and entertainment venues ===
- Wyvern Theatre and Swindon Arts Centre are sister theatres operated by Trafalgar Entertainment, with seated capacities of 635 and 212.
- Meca is a music and entertainment venue with a standing capacity of 1,500, or 700 seated.
- The Victoria is a pub situated in Old Town with a separate performance room to the rear, with a capacity of 200 standing.
- Smaller pubs exist, such as The Beehive and The Tuppenny, which host open mic and local performances.

=== Shopping ===
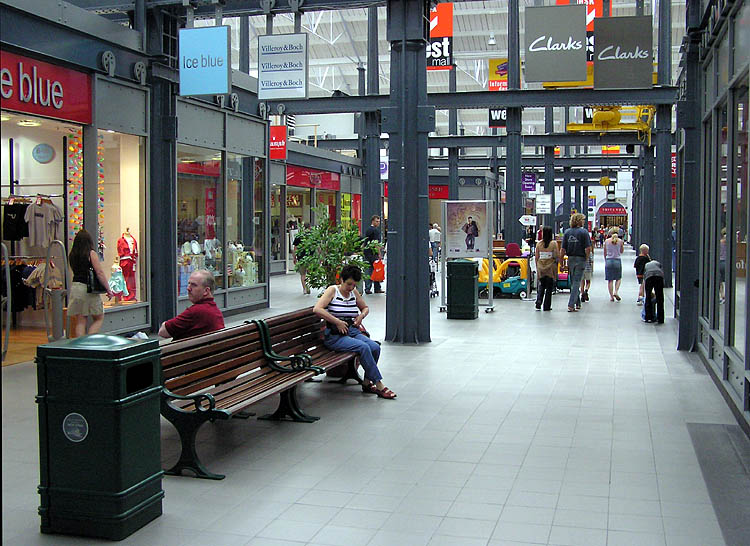
McArthur Glen Designer Outlet, a shopping complex built within the disused Swindon railway engine works

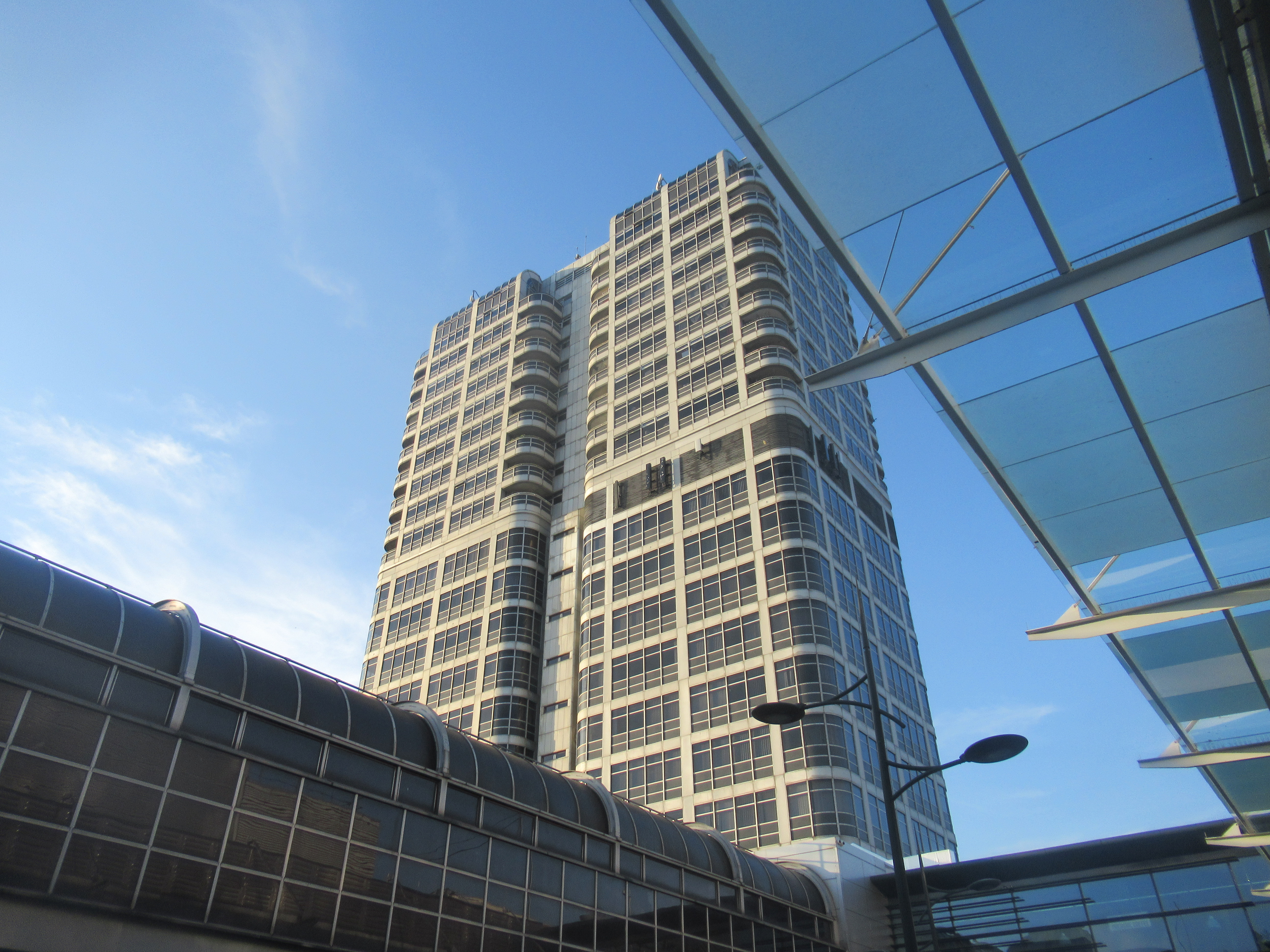
The David Murray John Tower near The Brunel Centre

- Swindon Designer Outlet (opened in 1997) is an indoor shopping mall for reduced-price goods, mainly clothing, on the site of the former railway works. The outlet is adjacent to the Steam Museum (opened in 2000) and the National Trust headquarters (since 2005). The mall has around 100 retailers and restaurants, and once held the record of the biggest covered designer outlet centre in Europe. It was enlarged in the mid-2010s.
- The Brunel Centre (opened in 1978) and The Parade (opened in 1967) are the two shopping complexes in the town centre, built along the line of the filled-in Wilts & Berks Canal (a canal milepost can still be seen). The Brunel Centre opened a food court called The Crossing in 2018.
- Greenbridge Retail and Leisure Park (Stratton St. Margaret (opened in 1964)), Orbital Shopping Park (Haydon Wick (opened in 2003)), and the West Swindon Shopping Centre / Shaw Ridge Leisure Park (opened in 1975) are the three major out-of-town facilities. There is also the Bridgemead Retail Park and Mannington Retail Park, both in West Swindon, in close proximity to each other.

Former

- Swindon Tented Market, in the Town Centre close to the Brunel Centre, was built in 1994. It reopened in October 2009, having been closed for two years, but closed again for good in August 2017. Demolition date is still to be confirmed.

=== Green spaces ===
Public parks include Lydiard Country Park, Shaw Forest Country Park, The Lawns, Stanton Park, Queens Park, GWR Park, Town Gardens, Pembroke Gardens and Coate Water. Fishing for the Moon is a small urban sensory garden created in 1990 by Thamesdown Borough Council and renovated by South Swindon Parish Council in 2021. Its central feature is an artwork by Michael Farrell.

== Media ==
=== Online ===
Swindon has many online media outlets, with the largest being The Swindon Advertiser. SwindonWeb was the first website dedicated to Swindon in 1997, followed by SwindonLink and The Swindonian, with many other sites now available, including Total Swindon and The Swindon Post.

=== Print ===
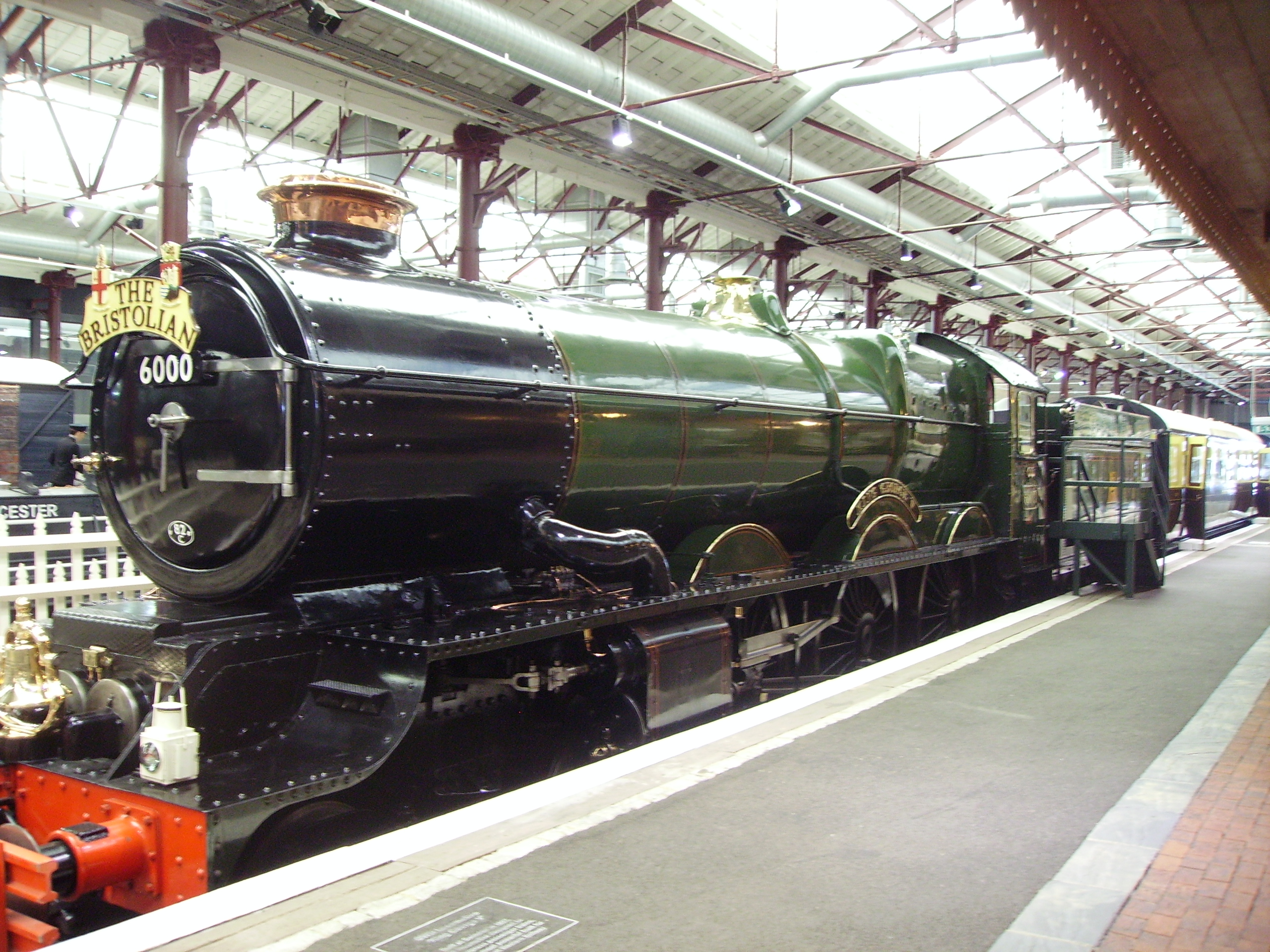
King George V pulling the 'Bristolian' passenger train at the Swindon Steam Railway Museum

==== Newspapers and magazines ====
Swindon has a daily newspaper, the Swindon Advertiser, with daily circulation of about 4,000 with an estimated readership of 21,000. Other newspapers covering the area include Bristol's daily Western Daily Press and the Swindon Advertisers weekly, the Gazette and Herald; the Wiltshire Ocelot (a free listings magazine), The Swindonian Monthly Magazine Swindon Star, Hungry Monkeys (a comic), Stratton Outlook, Frequency (an arts and cultural magazine), Great Swindon Magazine, Swindon Business News, Swindon Link and Highworth Link.

==== Literature ====
Swindon is the setting for the Thursday Next series of novels by Jasper Fforde and The Curious Incident of the Dog in the Night-Time by Mark Haddon.

=== Radio ===
The first commercial radio station launched in Swindon was Wiltshire Radio in 1982, with BBC Wiltshire Sound launched in 1989. Wiltshire Radio later changed to GWR FM, then to Heart Wiltshire, and is now Heart West, broadcasting from studios in Bristol. An alternative commercial radio station, Brunel FM, was launched in 2006 and replaced in turn by Total Star Swindon, More Radio, Jack FM and Sam FM; the frequency is now used by Greatest Hits Radio Swindon. Another independent station called Swindon FM was also on the air between 2001 and 2006.

Since 2008, the town has had its own 24-hour community radio station, Swindon 105.5, which was given the Queen's Award for Voluntary Service in 2014, the highest award which can be given to a voluntary group. In regard to the wider Wiltshire county, the public-sector station BBC Radio Wiltshire remains based in Swindon.

=== Television ===
The Swindon area is in the overlap between TV transmitters from two regions, Oxford (Thames Valley) and Mendip, supplemented by a local relay transmitter in the town (West of England). ITV regional news programmes come from ITV News Meridian (with offices at Abingdon) and ITV West Country (Bristol). On BBC One, the area is served by both South Today (from Southampton) and Points West (Bristol).

Between 1973 and 1982, the town had its own cable television channel called Swindon Viewpoint. This was a community television project run mainly by enthusiasts from studios in Victoria Hill, and later by Media Arts at the Town Hall Studios. It was followed by the more commercial Swindon's Local Channel, which included pay-per-view films. NTL (later Virgin Media) took over the channel's parent company, ComTel, and closed the station.

== Education ==
The borough of Swindon has many primary schools, 12 secondary schools, and two purpose-built sixth-form colleges. Three secondary schools also have sixth forms. There is one independent school, Maranatha Christian School at Sevenhampton.

=== Secondary schools ===
The secondary schools in the Borough of Swindon are:

- Abbey Park School (formerly Isambard School (ages 11–16))
- Commonweal School (11–18)
- Crowdy's Hill School (?–19)
- The Deanery CE Academy (11–15)
- The Dorcan Academy (11–16)
- Great Western Academy (11–18)
- Highworth Warneford School (11–16)
- The Kingfisher CE Academy (15–19)
- Kingsdown School (11–16)
- Lawn Manor Academy (11–16)
- Lydiard Park Academy (11–18)
- Nova Hreod Academy (11–16)
- The Ridgeway School and Sixth Form College (11–18)
- St Joseph's Catholic College (11–16)
- Swindon Academy (3–19 which is a post-nursery, primary and secondary school within Swindon)
- Uplands School (11–19)
- UTC Swindon (14–19)

Bradon Forest School (ages 11–18) is at Purton, near the west side of Swindon.

=== Further education ===
New College and Swindon College cater for the town's further education and higher education requirements, mainly for 16 to 22-year-olds. Swindon College is one of the largest FE-HE colleges in southwestern England, with a purpose-built campus in North Star, Swindon.

=== Higher education ===
Swindon is the UK's largest centre of population without its own university (by comparison, there are two universities in nearby Bath, which is half Swindon's size). In March 2008, a proposal was made by former Swindon MP, Anne Snelgrove, for a university-level institution to be established in the town within a decade, culminating in a future 'University of Swindon' (with some touting the future institution to be entitled 'The Murray John University, Swindon', after the town's most distinguished post-war civic leader).

Oxford Brookes University has had a campus in Swindon since 1999. The campus offers degrees in Adult Nursing and Operating Department Practice (ODP). The Joel Joffe Building opened in August 2016 and was officially opened in February 2017 by Lord Joel Joffe, a long-time Swindon resident and former human rights lawyer. From 1999 to 2016, the Ferndale Campus was based in north-central Swindon. The main OBU campus is about 27 miles (43 km) northeast of Swindon. The university also sponsors UTC Swindon, which opened in 2014 for students aged 14–19.

Between 2000 and 2008, the University of Bath had a campus in Walcot, east Swindon.

The Royal Agricultural University has its Cultural Heritage Institute in the former railway carriage works.

== Museums and cultural institutions ==
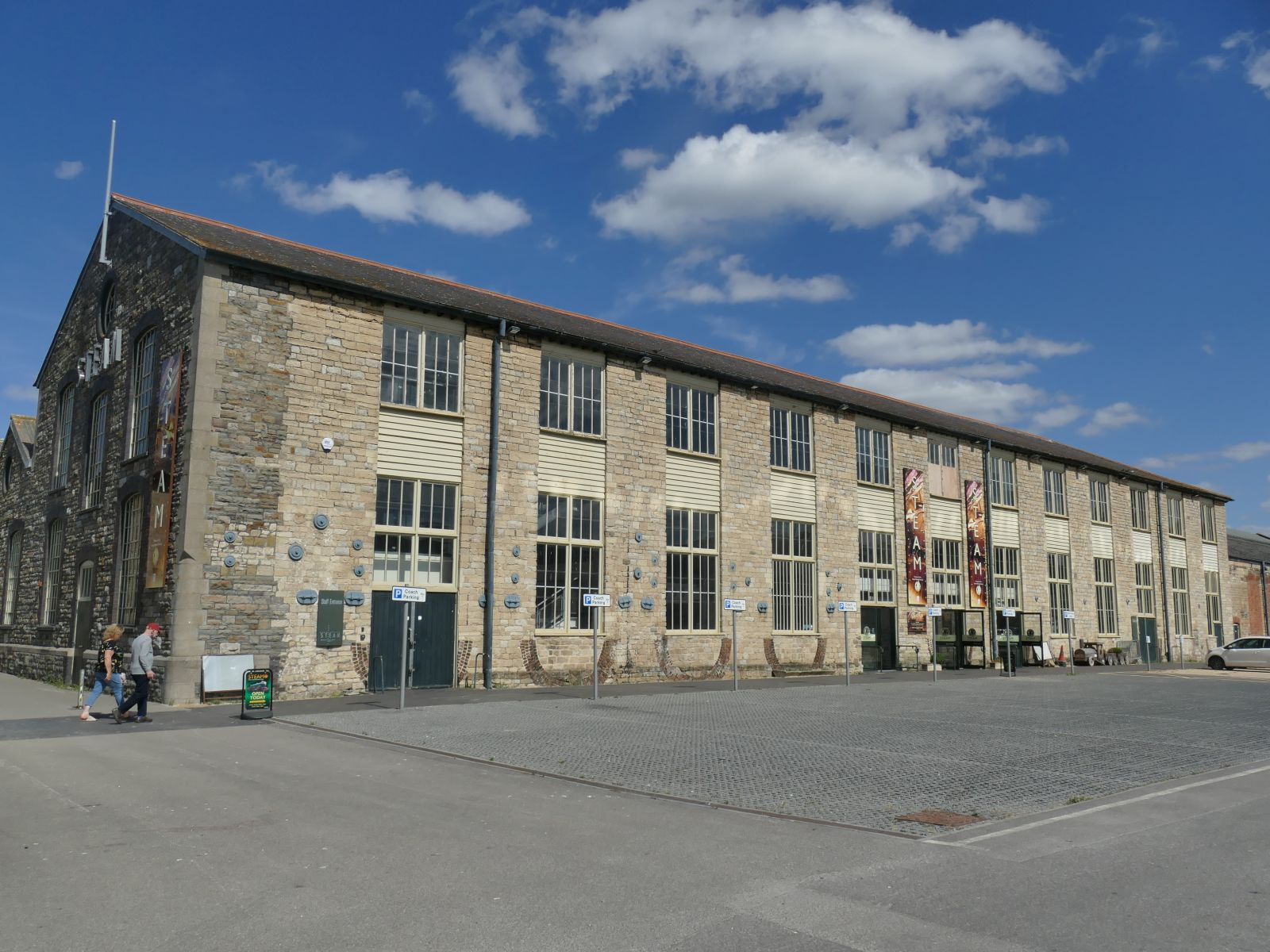
Swindon Steam Railway Museum

- The Richard Jefferies Museum, near Coate Water Country Park, is dedicated to the memory of one of England's most individual writers on nature and the countryside.
- STEAM – Museum of the Great Western Railway is on part of the site of the former railway works.
- Lydiard House, at the centre of Lydiard Country Park, is a Palladian house with staterooms containing collections of furniture and art.
- The Local Studies Collection at Swindon Central Library is an extensive local studies and family history archive.
- Swindon Arts Centre is a 212-seat entertainment venue in the Old Town.
- The Wyvern Theatre is the town's principal stage venue.
- Museum & Art Swindon has collections related to local history, archaeology and natural history, as well as a collection of modern British art and studio ceramics.
- The Museum of Computing was the first computer museum in the UK.
- The Science Museum's National Collections Centre is nearby at Wroughton.
- The Bodleian Library's Book Storage Facility is at South Marston on the edge of Swindon.

== Sport ==
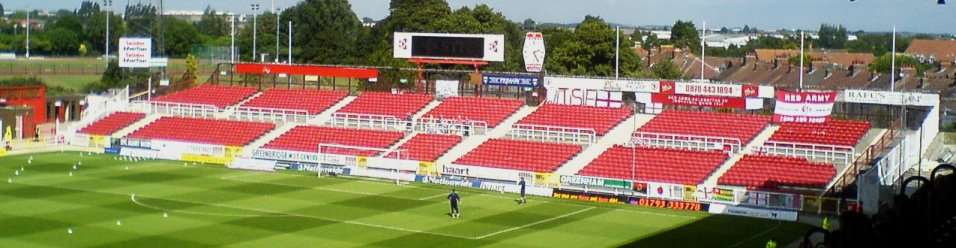
The Stratton Bank at the County Ground

=== Football ===
Swindon Town are based at the County Ground near the town centre. They play in League Two, the fourth tier of the English football league system, after being relegated from League One in 2021. They spent one season, 1993–94, in the Premier League. The affiliated club, Swindon Town Women, play in Division One South West of the FA Women's National League; their first team play home games outside the town at Fairford Town's Cinder Lane ground.

The town also has a non-league club, Swindon Supermarine, playing in the Premier South division of the Southern League at their South Marston ground. New College Swindon run a football academy for both sexes, usually alongside academic courses; until the summer of 2020 they fielded a football team, which played in Division One of the Hellenic League and was based at Supermarine's ground.

=== Rugby ===
Swindon has three rugby union teams, Swindon Rugby Football Club, Swindon College Old Boys Rugby Football Club, who play at Nationwide Pavillion[sic], and Supermarine Rugby Football Club.

Swindon St George is a rugby league team playing in the West of England Rugby League. The kit consists of black and red shirts with black shorts and socks. It was founded in 2007.

English Rugby player Jonny May lived in Chiseldon and attended The Ridgeway School & Sixth Form College located in Wroughton, both nearby villages to Swindon.

=== Ice hockey ===
The Swindon Wildcats are a professional ice hockey team founded in 1986. They play their home games at the 2,800-capacity Link Centre in West Swindon. They have consistently played in the second tier of English professional hockey, playing in the English Premier Ice Hockey League from 1997 until the league was disbanded in 2017, and from 2017 playing in the top division of the National Ice Hockey League.

=== Motor sports ===
Swindon Robins were a speedway team competing in the top national division, the SGB Premiership, where they were champions in the 2017 and 2019 seasons. The team was based at the Abbey Stadium, Blunsdon from 1949, but has not been able to race there since the end of the 2019 season.

Foxhill motocross circuit is 6 miles (9.7 km) southeast of the town and has staged Grand Prix events.

=== Athletics ===
Swindon has two athletics clubs affiliated to England Athletics, Swindon Harriers (running, track and field) and Swindon Striders (running). There is also a group called Swindon Shin Splints. Two Hash House Harrier running groups are centred on Swindon, North Wilts Hash House Harriers (who run every Sunday) and the Moonrakers Hash House Harriers (who run every other Wednesday evening). There is a parkrun held every Saturday at Lydiard Country Park.

== Notable residents ==
- Dean Ashton, former England international footballer
- Julian Clary, stand-up comedian who lived in Rodbourne
- Rick Davies, vocalist and keyboardist from the rock band Supertramp
- Diana Dors, actor
- Mehdi Hasan, British-American political journalist of Indian origin
- Justin Hayward, lead singer and guitarist in the band the Moody Blues
- Nick Hewer, businessman and TV presenter
- Mark Lamarr, comedian, TV presenter and radio host
- Electronic music group Meat Beat Manifesto, originally formed in 1987 in Swindon
- Melinda Messenger, TV presenter and former glamour model
- Edith New, suffragette
- Rachel Shelley, actress
- Gilbert O'Sullivan, Irish-born singer-songwriter who grew up in Swindon
- Billie Piper, actress
- Jon Richardson, stand-up comedian who used to live in the town
- Ben Thatcher, former Premier League footballer who played internationally for Wales
- Post-punk band XTC was formed in Swindon in 1972. Three of the band's singles reached the UK top 20, gaining them a cult following.
- Max Cook, motorcycle racer
- Fraser Rogers, motorcycle racer
- Luis Bachan, comedian and actor

== Twin towns ==
- Salzgitter, Germany
- Ocotal, Nicaragua
- Toruń, Poland
- Walt Disney World, Florida, US, for one year in 2010

== See also ==
- History of Swindon
- History of local government in Swindon
- List of people from Swindon
- List of schools in Swindon
- Transport in Swindon
- Swindon Civic Trust
- Economy of Wiltshire
- Healthcare in Wiltshire
