= Nova Hreod Academy =

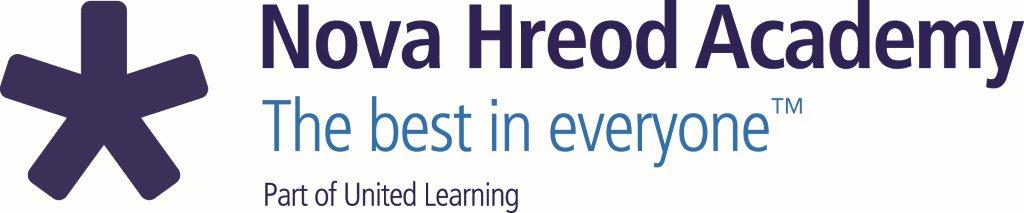

Location
- Akers Way; Moredon; Swindon, Wiltshire, SN2 2NQ; England; 51°35′28″N 1°48′11″W

Information
- Type: ULT Academy
- Motto: "High achievement and high standards"
- Established: 1966
- Local authority: Swindon
- Department for Education URN: 140515 Tables
- Ofsted: Reports
- Principal: James Harding-Mbogo
- Gender: Mixed
- Age: 11 to 16
- Enrolment: 1267 (January 2026)
- Colours: Navy blue and white
- Website: www.novahreodacademy.org.uk

Nova Hreod Academy (formerly Hreod Burna Senior High School, Hreod Parkway School and Nova Hreod College) is a mixed secondary school with academy status, in Swindon, Wiltshire, England, for students aged 11 to 16.

== History ==
Hreod is the Anglo Saxon word for a reed. The small stream that runs along the bottom of the field where the school was built is called the Hreod Burna, from which the first school got its name. It is a term found in the Domesday Book entry for the locality and describes a minor tributary of the River Ray which still runs through the valley in which Nova Hreod Academy lies.

Hreod Burna Senior High School was opened in 1966 for students aged 14 to 18, and had a sixth form. Initially, children were drawn from Moredon Secondary and Ferndale Secondary.

The first head teacher was Dr Blackwell, who remained at the school until 1984, just after New College opened to provide education for all sixth form students in the region. In 1983, Hreod Burna Senior High School amalgamated with Moredon Secondary School to form Hreod Parkway School, under the headship of Mr Cleall. Both Ferndale Secondary and Pinehurst Secondary were closed, and their buildings used for other activities by the local council.

== New campus ==
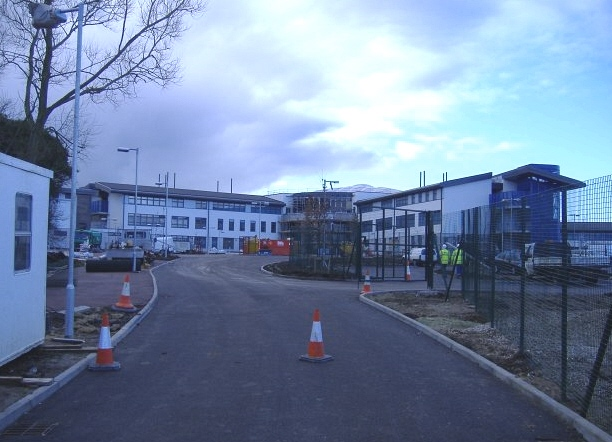
New school on Akers Way in January 2007

At Easter 2007, Hreod Parkway was vacated and everyone moved into the new campus built on an adjacent greenfield site. The new school was renamed Nova Hreod.

Julie Tridgell became headteacher in September 2008. In 2009, and again in 2016, GCSE results put Nova Hreod on the list of the most improved schools in the country.

In September 2024, James Harding-Mbogo became head teacher, replacing Nick Wells. In 2025, Nova Hreod Academy was ranked 5th best school in Swindon.

== Academy conversion and transformation ==
The school converted to academy status during the 2013/14 school year, under the United Learning group (ULT). This conversion saw ULT's Darren Barton take over as headteacher (the principal in ULT terms).

In 2015 the school's headline GCSE measures doubled to 60%. The following year, this increased to 62% of students gaining at least five A*–C grades including English and Maths. In February 2017, Ofsted inspectors judged the school to be 'Good', the first time in the school's history that it had achieved this rating.
