= Economy of Wiltshire =

The economy of Wiltshire in South West England was worth £21 billion to the UK economy in 2022.

== Overview ==
The Wiltshire economy benefits from the "M4 corridor effect", which attracts business, and the attractiveness of its countryside, towns and villages. The northern part of the county is richer than the southern part, particularly since Swindon is home to national and international corporations such as Intel, Motorola, Patheon, Catalent (formerly known as Cardinal Health), Becton-Dickinson, WHSmith and Nationwide, with Dyson located in nearby Malmesbury. Wiltshire's employment structure is distinctive in having a significantly higher number of people in various forms of manufacturing (especially electrical equipment and apparatus, food products, and beverages, furniture, rubber, pharmaceuticals, and plastic goods) than the national average.

In addition, there is higher-than-average employment in public administration and defence, due to the military establishments around the county, particularly around Amesbury and Corsham. There are sizeable British Army barracks at Tidworth, Bulford and Warminster, and the Royal School of Artillery is at Larkhill. Further north, RAF Lyneham was home to the RAF's Hercules C130 fleet until 2011; the MoD Lyneham site is now a centre for Army technical training. Wiltshire is also distinctive for the high proportion of its working-age population who are economically active (86.6% in 1999–2000) and its low unemployment rates. The gross domestic product (GDP) level in Wiltshire did not reach the UK average in 1998, and was only marginally above the rate for South West England.

== History ==
In the closing years of the 11th century, Wiltshire was sparsely populated. It did not have the most productive farmland, and much of the county was still forested, although there were many sheep. It was important in the economy for this reason, despite its low population. A largely rural county, agriculture has historically dominated the economy. From the early 13th century, when documentation of sheep farming properly begins, the business was highly organised. There was considerable movement of animals, selective breeding, and centralisation of wool sales. The cloth industry also grew, playing an important part of the Wiltshire economy.

From the 16th century, farming advanced, and more advanced techniques such as floating of water meadows were used. The cloth industry also reached its zenith at this time, despite being at the mercy of the foreign markets, and wars involving England.

The economy of Wiltshire declined in the 19th century. The cloth industry stagnated, with strong competition and the industrial revolution revolutionising the cloth mills in Yorkshire. The amount of arable land declined, and amount of permanent pasture increased, although a new milk market opened up into London, enabled by strong rail connections.

Swindon was chosen in the 1830s to be the site of the Great Western Railway's works, proving many jobs, and manufacturing sprung up which remains strong today.

== Manufacturing ==
Avon Protection, formerly Avon Rubber, makes personal protection equipment for defence and industry near Melksham; the company's Avon Tyres business at Melksham was sold to Cooper Tire & Rubber in 1993. Until the late 20th century, rubber parts for railways and other industries were also made nearby at Bradford-on-Avon. The engineer Alex Moulton specialised in rubber suspension systems, and a factory at Bradford-on-Avon still makes small-wheel bicycles under the Moulton brand.

An Arla creamery at Westbury makes Anchor butter. Nearby, Welton Bibby & Baron claim to be the UK's largest manufacturer of paper bags and similar goods.

The Honda car plant near Swindon closed in July 2021 after 36 years. 3,000 jobs were lost.

== Tourism ==
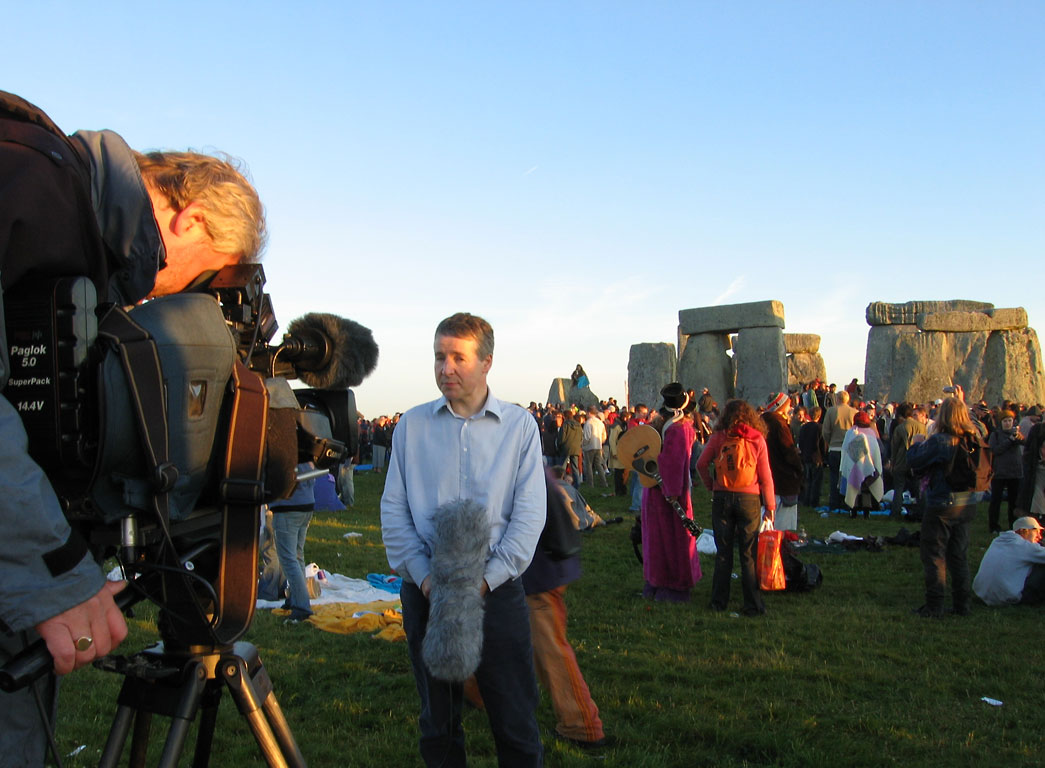
The summer solstice at Stonehenge

The World Heritage Site of Stonehenge is on Salisbury Plain in southern Wiltshire. The site is considered a British cultural icon and attracts many New Age travellers.

== See also ==
- List of ceremonial counties in England by gross value added
