= Haydon Meadow =

Protected area in Wiltshire, England

Coordinates: 51.59972°N 1.82814°W

Haydon Meadow (grid reference SU120890) known locally as Clifford Meadow is a 6.39 hectare biological Site of Special Scientific Interest in Wiltshire, notified in 1999.

The site lies within the Parish of Haydon Wick and is home to Anacamptis morio a rare protected species of Orchid family Orchidaceae. This flower was adopted as the logo for the nearby Priory Vale housing development.

== Sources ==
- Natural England citation sheet for the site (accessed 1 April 2022)
