= Priory Vale =

Coordinates: 51.597°N 1.806°W

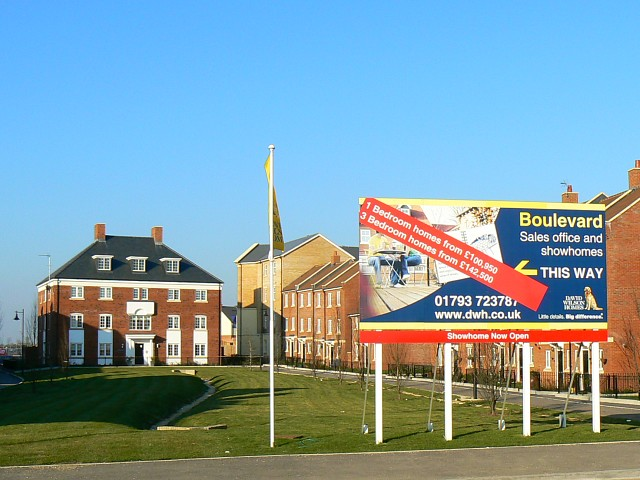

- Location within Wiltshire
- OS grid reference: SU135887
- Civil parish: Haydon Wick; St Andrews, Swindon
- Unitary authority: Swindon
- Ceremonial county: Wiltshire
- Region: South West
- Country: England
- Sovereign state: United Kingdom
- Post town: SWINDON
- Postcode district: SN25
- Dialling code: 01793
- Police: Wiltshire
- Fire: Dorset and Wiltshire
- Ambulance: South Western
- UK Parliament: North Swindon

Priory Vale is a community in the north of the town of Swindon, Wiltshire, England, which comprises the urban villages of Redhouse, Oakhurst and Haydon End. Although not strictly part of Priory Vale, the nearby village of Taw Hill completes this instalment of Swindon's northern expansion which began with Abbey Meads in the mid-1990s and continued at St Andrew's Ridge. The area was developed during the early 21st century.

Priory Vale is served by Thamesdown Drive, or the 'Northern Orbital Road', a dual carriageway which runs through the centre of the area and links Purton Road in West Swindon, itself an urban expansion area from the 1970s and 1980s, to the A419 Blunsdon bypass.

On completion, Priory Vale is expected to comprise just over 6,000 new homes spread over 640 acres (2.6 km^{2}). The homes themselves take up 390 acres (1.6 km^{2}), interspersed with 82 acres (330,000 m^{2}) of open space. Four primary schools and two secondary schools are provided.

Previously known as the Northern Development Area, the potential for development was identified by Swindon Corporation in the 1960s in planning documents known as the Gold and Silver books, and the scheme was confirmed in a "Vision for Thamesdown" in the 1980s.

== Location ==
Although within the urban area of Swindon, Priory Vale falls outside the traditional area of Swindon proper (covered by the parishes of Central Swindon North and South Swindon). The bulk of the expansion area lies within Haydon Wick parish, which covers the areas occupied by earlier developments from the 1970s at Haydon Wick, Haydonleigh, Greenmeadow, Abbey Meads, Haydon End, parts of Redhouse, Taw Hill and large parts of Oakhurst west of the Tadpole Brook. Redhouse, the northern part of the development, is within St Andrews parish.

== History of the area ==
Blunsdon, north of Priory Vale, is a village dating back to the Iron Age, where the earliest ancestors fortified and built a settlement. Blunsdon is mentioned in the Domesday Book of 1086 as 'Bluntesdone', at which time the settlements in the area had altogether ten households. In 1281, there was also a reference to 'Bluntesdon Seynt Andreu'. In recent years, archaeologists discovered a Roman travellers' resting place on the site of the present-day Cold Harbour pub a mile or so away from the 'northern expansion', and the A419 main road through Blunsdon follows the course of a Roman road known as Ermine Street that linked the historic towns of Cirencester and Silchester.

The recent Roman find at Groundwell Ridge Abbey Meads within the 'northern expansion' is believed to be a religious and ceremonial site.

Blunsdon Abbey was a grand Victorian house in the area, and its name inspired the title of the Abbey Meads development. The name 'Priory Vale' follows this monastic theme. Local tradition claims Blunsdon Abbey was originally an outpost of Godstow nunnery near Oxford. Apparently, the land was granted to the Brydges family during the reign of Henry VIII. In 1860, a wealthy sportsman, Clayton de Windt, purchased the estate and built a new house in the "latest Neo-Gothic style" to designs by E.Mantell of London. The builder was Thomas Barrett of Swindon, who created an imposing residence with forty bedrooms, grand interiors, entrance hall, billiards room and lavish furnishings. Clayton de Windt was killed in a riding accident in 1863, and in April 1904, fire destroyed the house and its contents.

The modern development occupies farmland and fields. The villages of Redhouse and Haydon End are named after these historical fields, while the village name of Oakhurst was taken from the name of the home at Haydon End Farm.

Prior to 1928, the parish of Haydon Wick was part of the parish of Rodbourne Cheney.

== Timeline of development ==
April 1983: Developer Crest Nicholson invited to participate in scheme by Godfrey and Jeremy Francis, land owners at Manor Farm, and enter into contractual arrangements with the family.

July 1992: Planning Permission granted on Haydon 1, the first phase of the scheme.

September 1993: Works commence on first phase at Manor Farm.

November 2001: The Mayor of Swindon, David Cox, officially opened the Northern Orbital Road. The three-mile stretch of dual carriageway provided the first stage of an important bypass to the north of Swindon. The new road gave access to the new supermarket and provided the necessary infrastructure to begin work on the planned community of Priory Vale.

The Asda supermarket opened for business on 26 November.

2002: Chris and Tracy Barnes, with their daughters Natalie and Jessica, became the first residents of Priory Vale. The couple took up residence in a three-storey house built by Bloor Homes in their Saunders Brook development.

May 2002: The May bank holiday saw the installation of what was reputed to be Swindon's 'showiest' bridge. Specifically designed for all pedestrian, cycle, disabled and equestrian use, this steel stayed structure spans 62 metres across the Northern Orbital Road. The bridge was transported from Tyneside complete and ready to position, minimising any disruption to traffic on Thamesdown Drive. The bridge later featured in an advert for the Honda Civic which is built in the town.

November 2002: The Priory Vale Visitor Centre opened to the public. The timber-framed building was designed by Nigel Clark Architects and built by EW Beard.

2005: Construction of the Learning Campus commences. The project involves designing, building and operating three primary schools – Red Oaks, Brimble Hill and Uplands – and a secondary school, Isambard Community School (later renamed Abbey Park School). The project also includes Orchid Vale primary school in Haydon End.

September 2006: Red Oaks and Orchid Vale primary schools open.

September 2007: It is proposed that a new community centre will be provided for Oakhurst and Redhouse residents.

=== The North Swindon Development Company ===
The first land deal that made Swindon's northern expansion project possible dates back to 1982 when housing developer Crest Nicholson was approached by land owners and farmers, the Francis family of Manor Farm. Following meetings between John Callcutt and Godfrey (Senior) and Jeremy Francis a deal was struck that set Crest Nicholson on its way to becoming involved in one of Europe's largest residential urban developments. Godfrey and Jeremy Francis introduced the Crest development team to other land owners within the scheme including the Clifford family of Haydon Farm. Following extensive negotiations all involving, Godfrey and Jeremy Francis fellow landowners, the Hitch and Webb's entered into contracts with Crest Nicholson. On obtaining planning permission, began in earnest.

After years of intense negotiation, and precisely 10 years later, planning permission for 10,000 new homes was granted in 1992 (known as the Haydon development) with the first phase of development commenced.

The Francis family were established land owners in Swindon farming over 700 acres of land in the area since1945 when they acquired their first farm at St Leonard's Blunsdon. A further acquisition was made in 1955 at Manor Farm Haydon Wick which formed the core of the Haydon Sector development Scheme. Godfrey Francis in particular assisted the management team at Crest and along with his son Jeremy formed a strong working relationship with both John Callcutt (then managing director of Crest homes 1982) and his brother Paul Callcutt head of Crest strategic Land. It is recognized that without the initial invitation to Crest Homes by Jeremy Francis and their continued involvement in Swindon to this day might never have taken place.

Work commenced in 1993, just off Lady Lane. From a slow start, 81 houses were built and sold in 1994, 800 houses were sold in 1997, and at the peak, the project had twelve of the UK's leading housebuilders building, with over 2,700 houses in the development known as Abbey Meads.

The North Swindon Development Company (NSDC) was formed to allow developers to share planning costs. It is owned and run jointly by George Wimpey, Westbury, Bloor Homes, Bryant Homes, Crest Nicholson and Asda.

== Amenities ==
There are six schools in Priory Vale: Brimble Hill Primary School, Abbey Park School, Red Oaks Primary School and Uplands Secondary School all within the Priory Vale Learning Campus in Redhouse; Orchid Vale Primary School in Haydon End; and Oakhurst Community Primary School in Oakhurst.

The area is home to what was reputed to be the largest supermarket in the United Kingdom, an Asda with 97,000 square feet (9,000 m^{2}) of retail space. As well as the superstore, the Orbital Shopping Park has a number of big-name stores including Marks and Spencer, Next, New Look and Homebase, a drive-through restaurant, coffee shops, a petrol station and the North Swindon Library.
