= Swindon Academy =

Location
- Beech Avenue; Swindon, Wiltshire, SN2 1JR; England; 51°34′53″N 1°47′13″W

Information
- Type: Academy
- Established: 2007
- Department for Education URN: 135364 Tables
- Ofsted: Reports
- Principal: Karen Wright
- Gender: Mixed
- Age: 2 to 19
- Enrolment: 1883 (2023)
- Original name: Headlands School
- Website: www.swindon-academy.org

Swindon Academy is a non-selective co-educational school within the English academy programme, in the Pinehurst area of Swindon, north of the town centre. It caters for children aged 3 to 19 and has 1,883 pupils on roll as of September 2023.

== History ==
The history of senior school education in Swindon can be traced back to the 19th century. In 1943, the college and Euclid Street Secondary Schools amalgamated to become Headlands Grammar School, a selective mixed school for those who passed the Eleven plus. With some 800 boys and girls, it moved into new buildings on the site of the present school in 1952. In 1964, the Grammar School became a comprehensive school for students aged 14–19, changing its name to the Headlands School. It later lost its Sixth form, becoming an 11–16 school.

In 2001 Ofsted judged the school to have serious weaknesses. The school was closed in summer 2004 and re-opened through the Fresh Start scheme with the same name as a community school in the autumn term of 2004.

As a result of a further merging of schools, Swindon Academy opened on the site in September 2007, replacing Headlands School, Pinehurst Junior School, and Pinehurst Infant School. The former grammar school buildings were demolished in December 2009.

== Admissions ==
As of September 2007, it is run by United Learning, formerly the United Church Schools Trust. It operates on a non-denominational basis, but follows the Christian, specifically Church of England, ethos of its parent organisation.

It is situated in the civil parish of Central Swindon North, near Upper Stratton and Pinehurst at the junction of Cricklade Road (A4311) and Beechcroft Road (B4006).

== Academic performance ==
From the formation of the Swindon LEA in 1997 until the school's closure in 2006, Headlands was consistently 2nd from bottom (1998 and 1999) or bottom (2000 onwards) of the Swindon schools league table when based on Level 2 results (5+ GCSEs at grades A*-C). On at least one occasion, it was also bottom of the National league table.

Since being replaced by the Swindon Academy, results have improved and despite being the lowest ranking in Swindon for the years 2008 and 2009, the academy is currently fourth from bottom if measured on Level 2 results. The academy achieved a score 72% for five A*–C grades at GCSE, although the number achieving five A*–C grade GCSEs (or equivalent) including maths and English is 37%, or 31% if GCSE equivalents are excluded. When measured on this criterion, the Swindon Academy is bottom of the Swindon league table, and has been since its creation in 2007. It is also well below the Swindon and national averages when based on this measurement.

== Alumni ==
=== Headlands School ===
- Mark Harper, Conservative MP for Forest of Dean from 2005 to 2024
- Colin Moulding, musician with XTC
- Andy Partridge, chief songwriter for XTC

=== Headlands Grammar School ===
- John Eatwell, Baron Eatwell, Professor of Financial Policy and Director since 2002 at the University of Cambridge
