= Swindon College =

Coordinates: 51°34′5.68″N 1°47′14.89″W

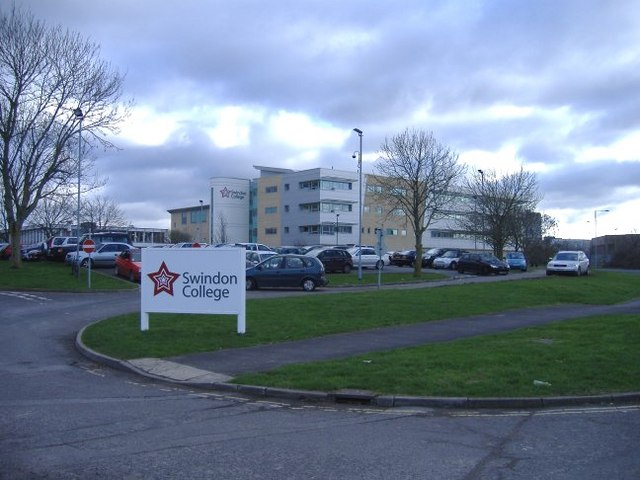

Location
- North Star Avenue; Swindon, Wiltshire, SN2 1DY; England

Information
- Type: FE/HE college
- Age: 14 to 19

Swindon College was a further education college in Swindon, England. Its campus was at North Star, just north of the town centre. The college offered HNC/Ds and Foundation Degrees, through to B.A. (Hons) courses and a postgraduate programme.

In August 2020, Swindon College merged into New College, Swindon. The merged college is classed as a general education college.

Notable alumni include Reverend Carol Stone (1954–2014), who also served as a governor of the college.

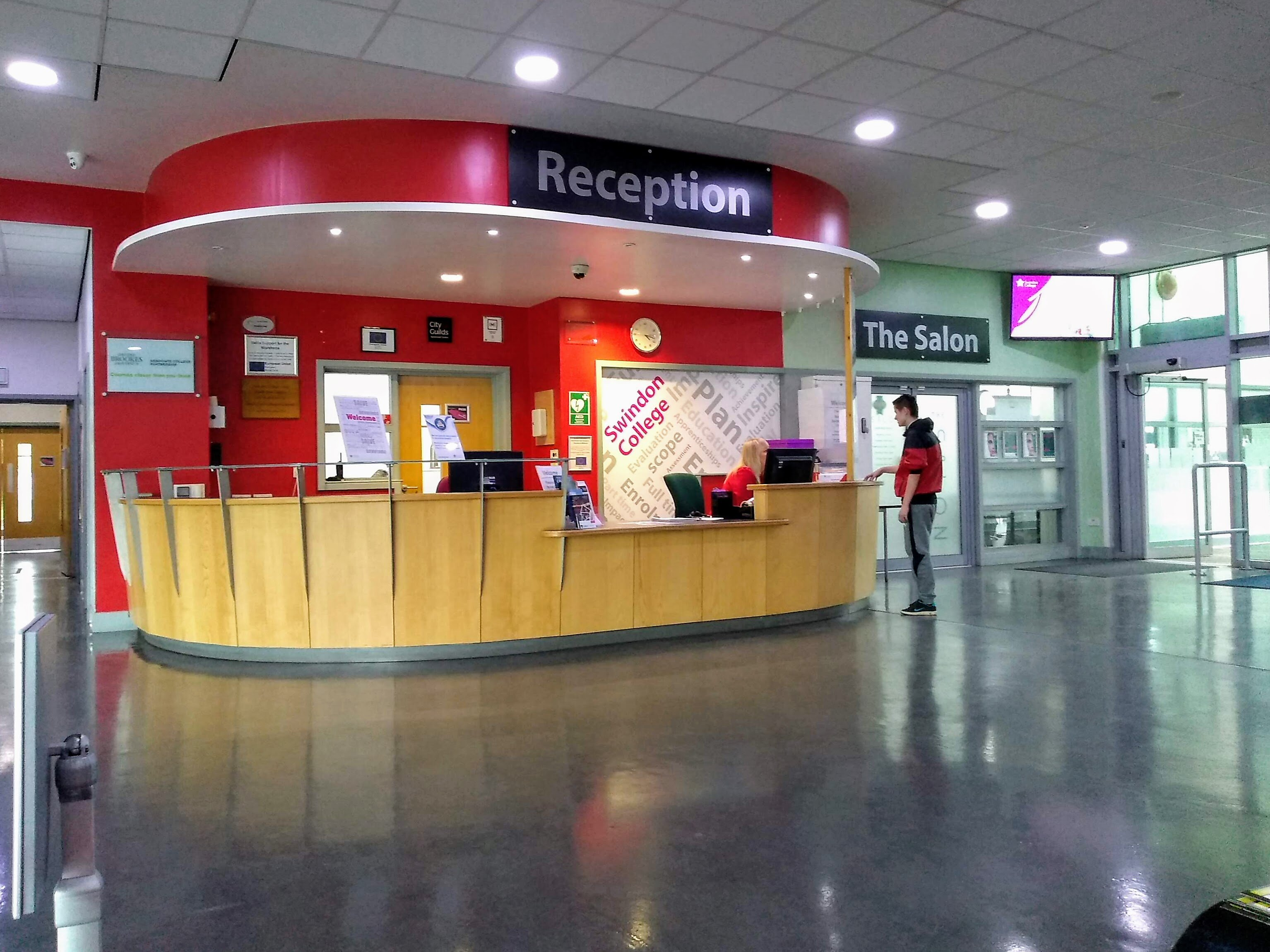
Reception area in main building, 2019
