= UTC Swindon =

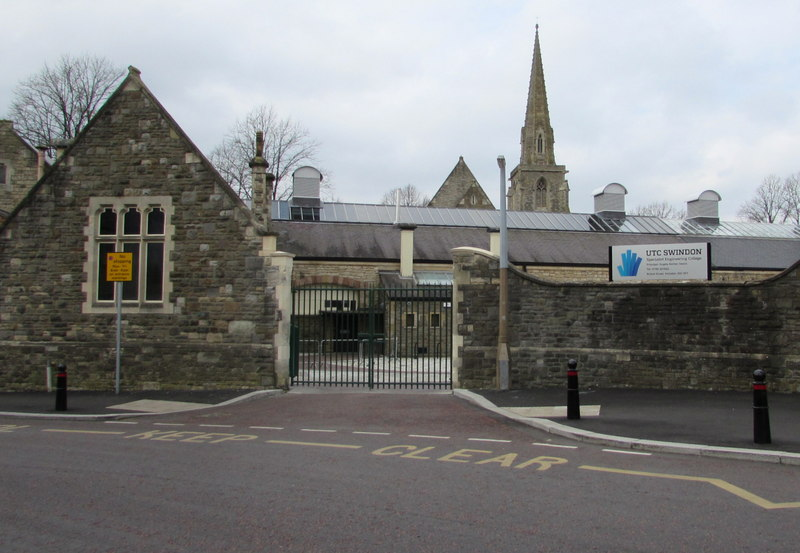

Location
- Bristol Street; Swindon, Wiltshire, SN1 5ET; England; 51.5613°N 1.7940°W

Information
- Type: University Technical College
- Established: 1 September 2014
- Trust: Activate Learning Education Trust
- Department for Education URN: 145155 Tables
- Ofsted: Reports
- Executive principal: Samantha Knowlton
- Gender: Coeducational
- Age: 14 to 19
- Enrolment: 177 (September 2022)
- Capacity: 600
- Website: www.utcswindon.co.uk

UTC Swindon is a University Technical College (UTC) in Swindon, England that opened in September 2014 for students of ages 14–19. The college specialises in engineering and is sponsored by Oxford Brookes University and Johnson Matthey Fuel Cells.

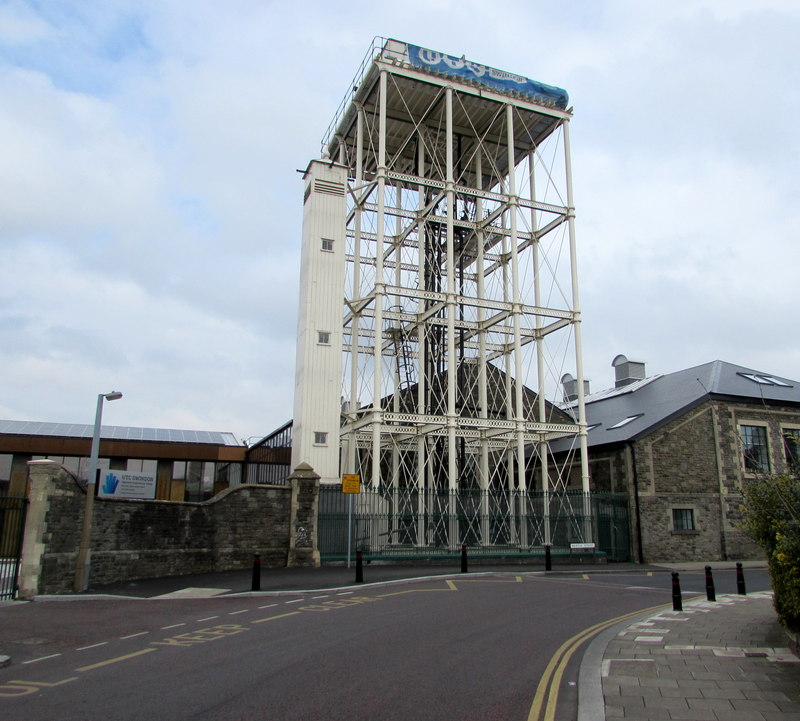
The 1870 water tower is a Swindon landmark

The campus is on the northwestern edge of Swindon Railway Village, built in the 1840s for workers at the Great Western Railway's Swindon Works. The college is partly newly built and partly in a single-storey building of c. 1845 which was formerly part of the GWR School. Also on the site is a preserved cast iron water tower of 1870, which served the Works.

The college has capacity for 600 pupils.

== History ==
The college opened in September 2014, and was formally opened by the then Prince Andrew in December of that year.

An Ofsted inspection in January 2017 rated the UTC as 'inadequate' in almost every area. At that time the college was being led by the deputy principal, and had an enrolment of 153. Later that year Joanne Harper, principal of UTC Reading, was appointed executive principal and the UTC came under the sponsorship of Activate Learning Education Trust.

The college's most recent Ofsted inspection was in 2020, with an overall judgement of 'requires improvement'. Leadership and management were rated 'good' but the quality of education was judged not yet good enough.

== Academics ==
Students enter either at the start of Key Stage 4, in year 10, or at the start of Key Stage 5, the sixth form. Every student has an entitlement to work experience.

Key Stage 4 students follow a core curriculum of GCSE English, Mathematics and Science, together with specialist study of engineering and cyber security, and further optional subjects.

At Key Stage 5, the college offers a choice of A-levels and BTECs in a variety of subjects, including a Level 3 extended diploma in Engineering.
