= Lawn Manor Academy =

Location
- Salcombe Grove; Swindon, Wiltshire, SN3 1ER; England
- Coordinates: 51.5541°N 1.7625°W

Information
- Type: Academy
- Established: 2017
- Local authority: Swindon
- Department for Education URN: 144773 Tables
- Ofsted: Reports
- Executive headteacher: Sandra Muir
- Head of school: Russell Langdown
- Gender: Coeducational
- Enrolment: 939 (January 2025)
- Houses: Fitzroy, Pleydell, Goddard
- Website: www.lawnmanor.org

Lawn Manor Academy is a secondary school with academy status in Walcot, Swindon, Wiltshire, England. Its site is next to The Lawn, a public park which was the grounds of a manor house, home of the Goddard family.

The first school on this site was Lawn School, which opened in 1964. In 1965, education in Swindon was reorganised and the secondary schools became comprehensive. Around this time the school's name was changed to Churchfields School. Following its conversion to academy status in 2012, the school was renamed Churchfields Academy.

In May 2017, the school joined the Royal Wootton Bassett Academy Trust, and from September of that year its name became Lawn Manor Academy.

From 2016 to 2023, the school received consistent "Requires Improvement" ratings from Ofsted. In 2023, the school achieved its first "Good" rating in nearly a decade.
