= Kingsdown School =

Location
- Hyde Road, Stratton St Margaret; Swindon, Wiltshire, SN2 7SH; England; 51.592°N 1.759°W

Information
- Type: Academy
- Motto: Innovative Education - Traditional Values
- Religious affiliation: Christian
- Established: 1932
- Department for Education URN: 145139 Tables
- Ofsted: Reports
- Chair of Governors: Luke Walduck
- Headteacher: Emma Leigh-Bennett
- Gender: Mixed
- Age: 11 to 16
- Enrolment: 942 (November 2023)
- Houses: Nubian, Mosbach, Atlas, Barbary
- Website: www.kingsdownschool.co.uk

Kingsdown School is a mixed secondary school with academy status in Swindon, Wiltshire, England. In its February 2020 Ofsted report, it was rated 'Good'.

In August 2019 the school was at the centre of a county lines investigation by Wiltshire Police, with 40 pupils suspected of being involved in the supply of cannabis and cocaine and girls as young as 14 being coerced into sexual activity in exchange for drugs.
