= Highworth Warneford School =

Location
- Shrivenham Road; Highworth; Swindon, Wiltshire, SN6 7BZ; England; 51°37′36″N 1°42′33″W

Information
- Type: Academy
- Motto: Salubritas et Industria
- Established: 1957
- Local authority: Swindon Borough Council
- Trust: The Park Academies Trust
- Department for Education URN: 150277 Tables
- Ofsted: Reports
- Principal: Sophie Hesten
- Vice principal: Mark Nye
- Gender: Coeducational
- Age: 11 to 16
- Enrolment: 775 (August 2023)
- Houses: Buscot; Hampton; Coleshill; Stanton
- Colours: Royal Blue (Lower School); Navy Blue (Upper School)
- Website: www.warnefordschool.org

Highworth Warneford School is a coeducational secondary school in the small town of Highworth, north of Swindon, Wiltshire, England.

== History ==
Warneford Secondary Modern School was established in 1957. The main buildings from the original school are still in use. The modern Highworth Warneford was established in 1975. There have been constant expansions of the school ever since, including the addition of a sports hall.

Previously a community school administered by Swindon Borough Council, in July 2011 Highworth Warneford School converted to academy status.

At its March 2018 Ofsted inspection the school was assessed as "Requires Improvement", a deterioration from the 2013 rating of "Good".

In September 2023 the school joined The Park Academies Trust.

== Notable former pupils ==
- Felix de Giles - jockey
