= New College Swindon =

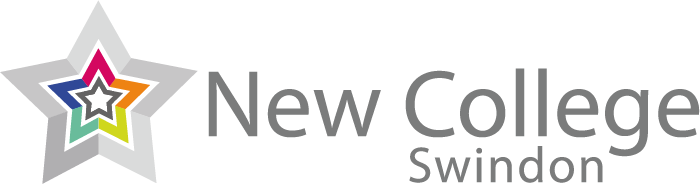

Location
- New College Drive; Swindon, Wiltshire, SN3 1AH; England; 51.5575°N 1.7583°W

Information
- Type: Further and higher education
- Established: 1983; 43 years ago
- Department for Education URN: 130851 Tables
- Ofsted: Reports
- Acting Principal: Leah Palmer
- Gender: Coeducational
- Enrolment: approx. 4,800
- Website: www.newcollege.ac.uk

New College Swindon is a further and higher education institution in Swindon, Wiltshire, England. There are two main campuses, Queens Drive and North Star, as well as an adult learning centre in Swindon town centre. The college offers qualifications for all ages: GCSEs, A Levels, T Levels, vocational qualifications, higher education and degree-level courses.

== History ==
New College Swindon was established in 1983 and moved to a purpose-built campus in 2003.

In August 2020, New College Swindon merged with Swindon College.

Leah Palmer was appointed interim principal and chief executive at the start of the 2023–2024 academic year, replacing Carole Kitching, who held those roles since 2018.

The college runs a football academy where students train and play, typically alongside an academic course. Until 2020, they fielded New College Swindon F.C. (previously New College Academy F.C.). The college also offers a basketball academy and a netball academy.

The outcome of an Ofsted inspection in March 2025 was 'Requires Improvement'.

== Partnerships ==
New College Swindon has formed partnerships with the University of Gloucestershire, Oxford Brookes University and Bath Spa University to offer foundation degrees and degrees.

== Notable alumni ==
- Shelley Rudman – skeleton bob world champion and Olympic medallist
- Laura Halford – British champion in rhythmic gymnastics
- Louise Hunt – wheelchair tennis
- Anna Mayes – former England national netball team head coach

== Achievements ==
- A Level pass rate of 98%, with over 41% of grades at A*, A or B (Summer 2019)
- Number one for College Achievement rates amongst local colleges
- The top performing state school/college for Level progress in Swindon and Cirencester (January 2020 performance tables)

== See also ==
- Education in Swindon
