= Abbey Park School =

Location
- The Learning Campus, Redhouse Way; Swindon, Wiltshire, SN25 2ND; England; 51.6030°N 1.8185°W

Information
- Type: Academy
- Motto: Potential into Performance
- Established: 2007 (as Isambard School)
- School district: Redhouse
- Department for Education URN: 145744 Tables
- Ofsted: Reports
- Head of School: Jon Ward
- Gender: Mixed
- Age: 11 to 16
- Enrollment: 1180 (September 2024)
- Colours: Black and Gold
- Website: abbeyparkschool.org.uk

Abbey Park School (formerly Isambard School) is a mixed secondary school in North Swindon, Wiltshire, England.

The school was called Isambard School when it was established in 2007. In 2016, it was judged inadequate by Ofsted. The name and uniform changed in 2017. In 2018, Abbey Park School became an academy, joining the Park Academies Trust. As of 2024, its most recent inspection was in 2023, with an overall judgement of good.

== School houses ==
There are five school houses at Abbey Park School:

- Avebury
- Barbury
- Kennet
- Stonehenge
- Whitehorse

== Notable alumni ==
- Tyreke Johnson, footballer
