= List of places in Swindon =

This is a list of areas, tourist attractions and other places of interest in the English town of Swindon and its surrounding built-up area.

== Areas ==
- Abbey Meads
- Bridgemead
- Broome Manor

Home to the Broome Manor Golf Course and various businesses including the world headquarters of Burmah Castrol as well as the UK headquarters of the Nationwide Building Society and Intel.

- Cheney Manor

Built around 1952.

- Churchward
- Coleview
- Covingham

Covingham Park estate was built in 1964.

- Croft
- Dorcan

Taking its name from the nearby Dorkerne (now Dorcan) brook, Dorcan lies between Eldene, Liden, Covingham and the A419 bypass. Parts of these surrounding areas are also sometimes referred to as being in Dorcan (such as Eldene shopping centre which uses Dorcan in its address). It is the site of the Dorcan industrial estate which includes the UK Headquarters of Tyco Electronics and RWE npower.
The Dorcan Academy (formerly Dorcan Comprehensive School) is also in this area, providing the locality with sports facilities. Notable as the school attended by Melinda Messenger, and actor Mark Lawrence (from the series Band of Brothers).

- Eastleaze
- Eastmead
- East Wichel – part of the Wichelstowe development
- Eldene

Built in the 1970s on the site of Snodshill Farm, the site of Texaco offices

- Even Swindon – now more commonly known as Rodbourne
- Ferndale
- Freshbrook

Part of West Swindon, the estate was built in 1980–1984.
Including offices of RWE and Cable & Wireless at Windmill Hill.

- Gorse Hill
- Grange Park
- Greenbridge

Mainly large areas of business, including the head office of TGJones (built for WHSmith) and the former site of the EMI CD pressing plant

- Greenmeadow
- Hawksworth
- Haydon Wick
- Kembrey Park
- Kingsdown
- Lawn
- Liden

Has three large tower blocks

- Marshgate
- Moredon
- Middleleaze
- New Town
- Nine Elms
- North Star

Including Swindon College and the former Oasis leisure centre

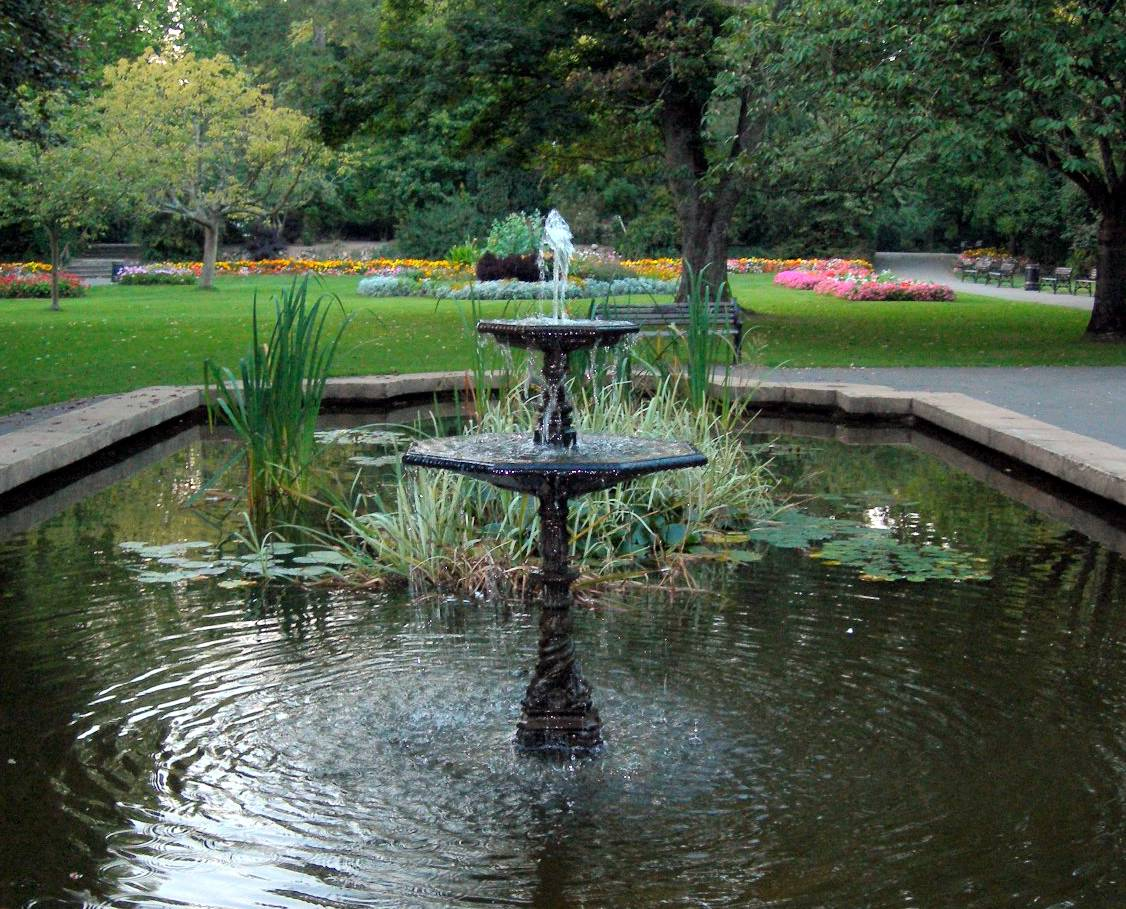
A fountain in Town Gardens, Old Town

- Nythe
- Oakley Park
- Okus
- Old Town
- Park North

Estate built 1957–65; has three 10-storey tower blocks

- Park South

Estate built 1957–65
Including Cavendish Square, a shopping area which has now been rebuilt into a smaller shopping area with the removal of most of the residential flats above the shops

- Peatmoor
- Pembroke Park
- Penhill

Built 1951–55; has three 10-storey tower blocks

- Pinehurst

Built 1910–20 as Swindon's first council housing estate

- Railway Village

Built during the period 1840–45 by the Great Western Railway to house employees

- Ramleaze
- Raybrook Park
- Rodbourne
- Rodbourne Cheney
- Rushey Platt
- Shaw
- South Leaze
- Sparcells
- South Marston

Including the UK headquarters of Zimmer

- Stratton St Margaret
- Upper Stratton
- Lower Stratton
- St Andrew's Ridge
- Taw Hill
- The Prinnels
- Toothill

Part of West Swindon, built in the mid-1970s

- Walcot East

Built from 1956

- Walcot West (Old Walcot)

Built from the mid-1930s

- Westmead
- Westlea

The West Swindon shopping centre, the first out of town, has a supermarket and other small shops; later the Link Centre, a leisure centre with an ice rink and swimming pool, was added

- West Leaze
- Windmill Hill
- Woodhall
- Woodhall Park

== Areas under construction ==
- Priory Vale or North Swindon Development; includes Redhouse, Oakhurst and Haydon End
- Wichelstowe or Southern Development Area
- New Eastern Villages

== Points of interest ==
Key
	Abbey/Priory/Cathedral
Accessible open space	Accessible open space
	Amusement/Theme Park
	Castle
Country Park	Country Park
	English Heritage
	Forestry Commission
Heritage railway	Heritage railway
Historic house	Historic House
Places of Worship	Places of Worship
Museum (free) Museum	Museum (free/not free)
National Trust	National Trust
	Theatre
	Zoo

- Coate Water Country Park
- County Ground – Swindon Town F.C.'s stadium
- Lawns Park
- Lydiard Park
- Lydiard House
- The Magic Roundabout – a large roundabout containing five mini-roundabouts
- Mouldon Hill Country Park
- Museum & Art Swindon
- Museum of Computing
- Museum of the Great Western Railway
- Queens Park
- Richard Jefferies Museum
- Town Gardens
- Wyvern Theatre
