= Central Swindon North =

Civil parish in Swindon, Wiltshire, England

Coordinates: 51.578044°N 1.799376°W

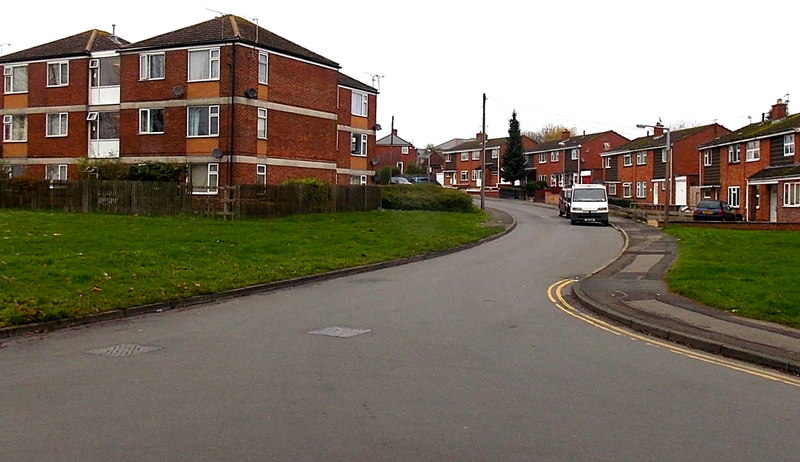
- Central Swindon North in 2014

- Location within Wiltshire
- Population: 36,834 (2021 census)
- Civil parish: Central Swindon North
- Unitary authority: Borough of Swindon
- Ceremonial county: Wiltshire
- Region: South West
- Country: England
- Sovereign state: United Kingdom
- Post town: Swindon
- Postcode district: SN1, SN2
- Dialling code: 01793
- Police: Wiltshire
- Fire: Dorset and Wiltshire
- Ambulance: South Western
- UK Parliament: Swindon South

Central Swindon North is a civil parish in the borough of Swindon, Wiltshire, England.

== History ==
The parish of Central Swindon North was created in 2017, alongside Central Swindon South (later renamed to South Swindon).

In 2022, the council opened a new accessible play park at Pinetrees Community Centre.

== Geography and demographics ==
As its name suggests, the parish covers the northern half of the central area of the town, the east–west railway line separating it from South Swindon parish. Areas within the parish include Even Swindon, Rodbourne, Moredon, Pinehurst, Penhill and Gorse Hill. The River Ray, a minor river flowing north to join the Thames, forms part of the western boundary of the parish.

The population of the parish was 36,834 at the 2021 census.

== Governance ==
The parish spans three wards which each elect three members of Swindon Borough Council: Gorse Hill and Pinehurst, Rodbourne Cheney, and the eastern half of Mannington and Western.

For Westminster elections, Central Swindon North is part of the Swindon North constituency.

== Landmarks ==
Landmarks in the parish include:

- The site of the Swindon Works of the Great Western Railway, where locomotives and rolling stock were built and maintained between 1843 and 1986. Two former workshops and the Chain Test House, are Grade II* listed. Most of the site is now the Swindon Designer Outlet; also here are STEAM (the museum of the Great Western Railway), and the headquarters of English Heritage and the National Trust (in the Heelis building).
- St Augustine's Church, Even Swindon – a Church of England parish church consecrated in 1908.
- The Oasis Leisure Centre – a domed structure in operation from 1976 to 2020, expected to reopen in 2026.
- The North Star campus of Swindon College
- The headquarters of the UK Space Agency
- Swindon railway station and Swindon loco yard

== See also ==
- List of civil parishes in Wiltshire
