= Eastmead =

Eastmead may refer to:

- William Eastmead
- Eastmead, Swindon, England
- Eastmead, Pretoria, South Africa
