= Vernon Henry St John, 6th Viscount Bolingbroke =

Vernon Henry St John, 6th
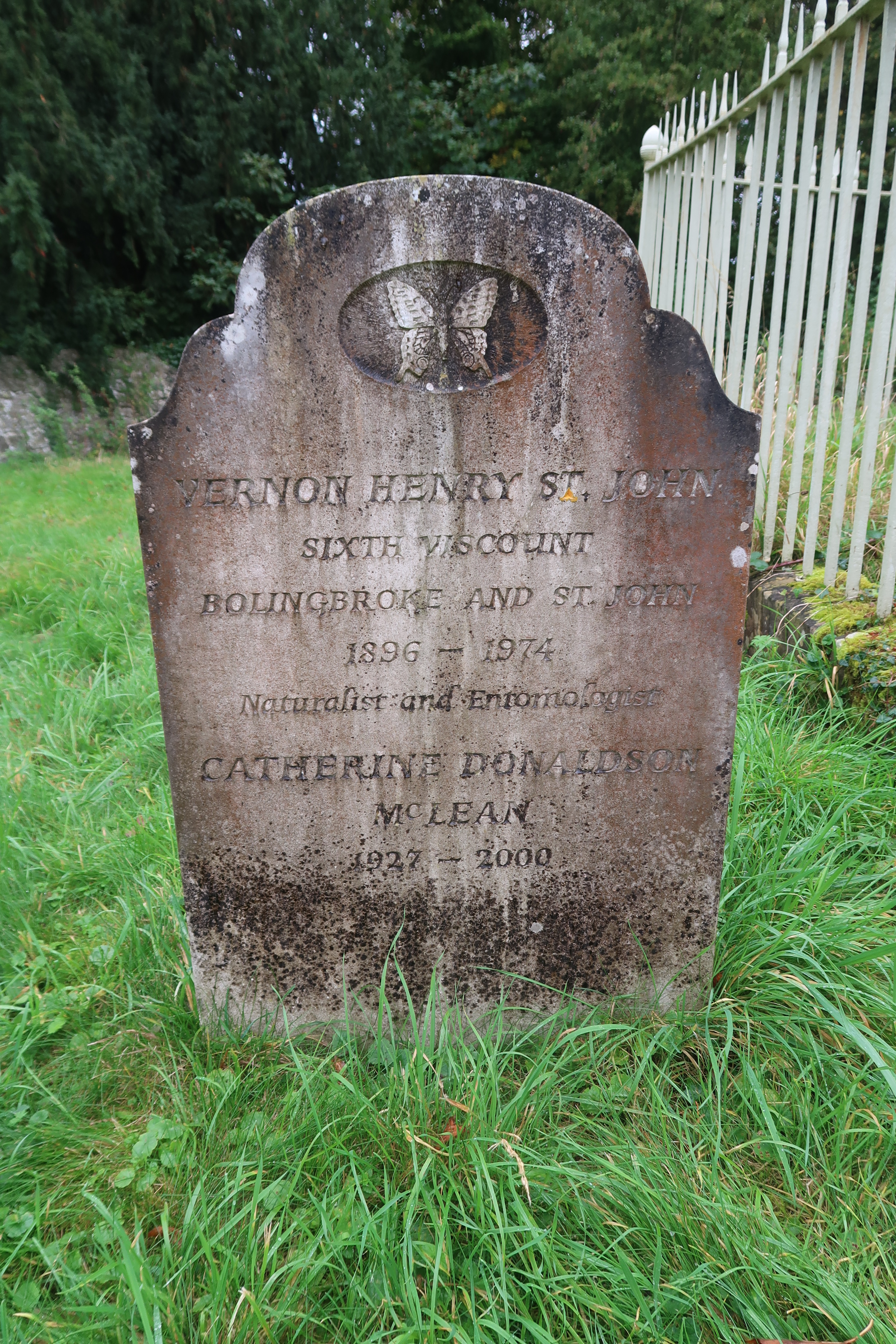
- Vernon Henry St John's gravestone at his burial (with his carer) at St Mary's Church, Lydiard Tregoze
- Born: 15 March 1896
- Died: 1 May 1974 (aged 78)
- Occupation: British peer

Vernon Henry St John, 6th Viscount Bolingbroke (15 March 1896 – 1 May 1974) was a British peer. He was the fourth child of Henry St John, 5th Viscount Bolingbroke and his wife Mary Elizabeth Emily, a former domestic. The couple's secret marriage and the existence of an heir was revealed only after the death of the 5th Viscount in 1899 and went on to become a national scandal. Although the couple had three boys, Vernon Henry was the only one who was legitimate and thus inherited the title of Viscount Bolingbroke.

== Early life ==
Vernon Henry was born in Bath on 15 March 1896. After the 5th Viscount's death and the revelation of the marriage and children, Mary Howard, now the dowager Viscountess Bolingbroke, moved to live permanently at Lydiard Park, the Bolingbroke family seat outside the Wiltshire village of Lydiard Tregoze, with her sons and her cousin Edward Hiscock, whom she installed as her confidant and estate manager. None of the children was to have any formal education and they were looked after by a procession of nurses and nannies. Vernon Henry spent the whole of his childhood at Lydiard, while his older brothers moved away in the early years of the 20th century.

== Army service ==
St John enlisted as a private soldier in 1917, soon after his coming of age party. He joined the 6th Dorsetshire Regiment and saw service in a variety of conflicts – including Reux and Passchendaele – before being invalided out a week before the Armistice.

== Peerage claim (1922–1926) ==
The case again made national headlines in 1922 when St John petitioned the House of Lords to be recognized as the 6th Viscount Bolingbroke. During the Lords hearing, witnesses were cross-examined and many of the family's details were revealed.

After a long intervening period, St John was officially recognized as the 6th Viscount Bolingbroke in 1926.

During the Second World War, Lydiard Park was requisitioned for a variety of military uses. After the death of his mother, Vernon moved away from the ancestral home which was in the process of being sold to Swindon Corporation. He took up residence in Ringwood, Hampshire, during which time he was befriended by the art historian Rupert Gunnis.

== Marriage ==
In 1950 Vernon married Valezina Frohawk, the daughter of renowned lepidopterist William Frohawk, in Sutton, Surrey. The marriage was annulled two years later after Valezina's claims of her husband's unreasonable behaviour, which many speculated was due to shell shock from his army service.

== Death ==
The 6th Viscount died on 1 May 1974 at Crow Hill, just outside Ringwood in Hampshire.

Peerage of Great Britain
Preceded by Henry St John	Viscount Bolingbroke; 1899–1974	Succeeded by Kenneth St John
Preceded by Henry St John	Viscount St John; 1899–1974	Succeeded by Kenneth St John
