= Henry St John, 5th Viscount Bolingbroke =

- Born: 30 March 1820
- Died: 7 November 1899 (aged 79)
- Occupation: British peer

Henry St John, 5th Viscount Bolingbroke (30 March 1820 – 7 November 1899) was a British peer. He assumed his peerage on the death of his father, Henry St John, 4th Viscount Bolingbroke, in 1851. He took his seat in the House of Lords later the following year.

== First "marriage" ==
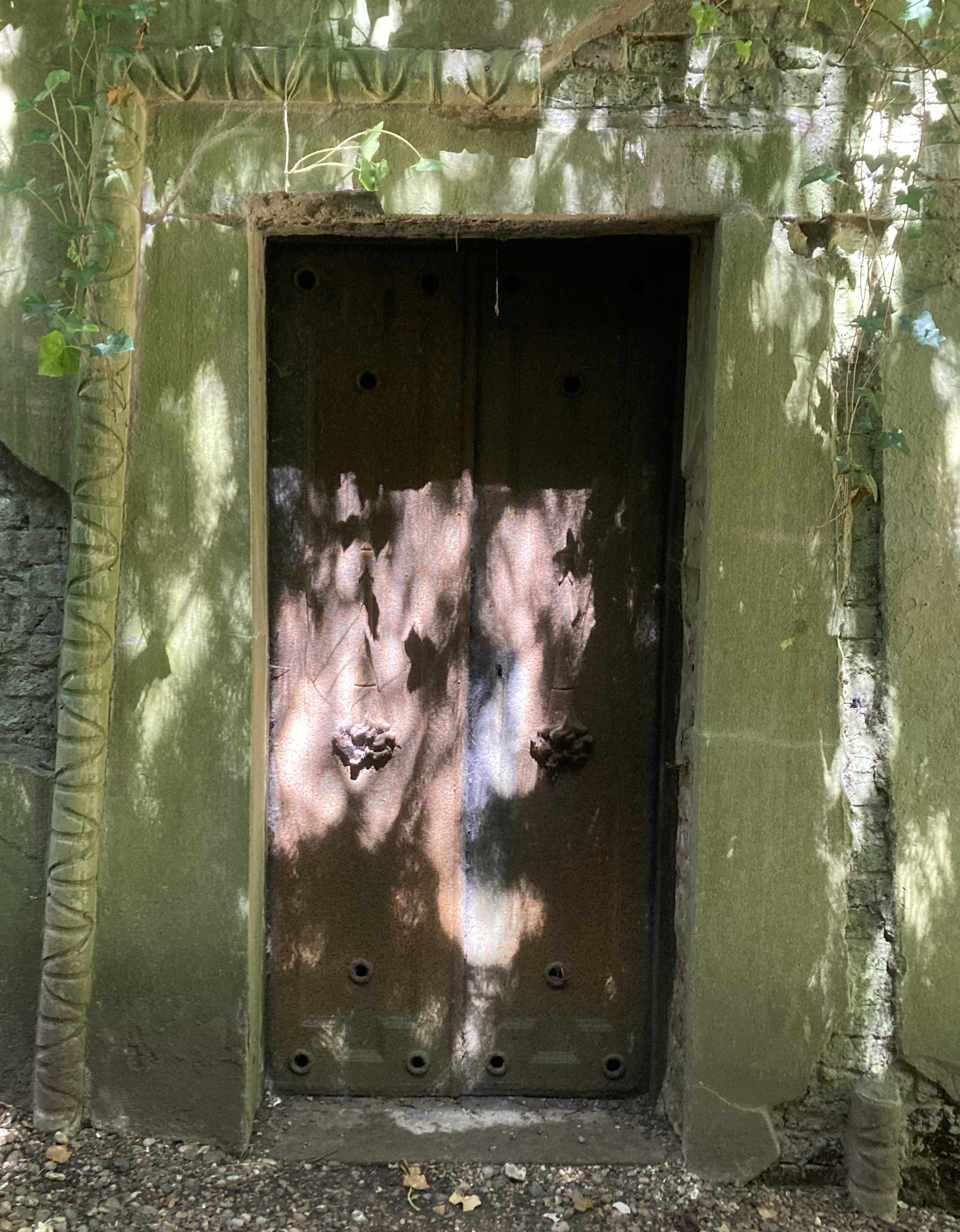
Vault of Ellen, "Viscountess Bolingbroke" in the Egyptian Avenue of Highgate Cemetery

After inheriting the title, Henry did not return to the family seat at Lydiard Park, Wiltshire, but preferred to stay in London. In 1852 he met the half-Jewish Ellen Medex, daughter of Charles and Miriam Medex. Although the couple never married, they masqueraded as Mr and Mrs Morgan, and for over thirty years lived at various addresses in London and Brighton. During these years Ellen gave birth to four children, only one of whom, Ellen Rose (b.1863), survived. She was baptized Ellen Rose St John Morgan.

Ellen died in 1885 and was buried in a vault in the Egyptian Avenue at Highgate Cemetery, north London. Despite a lack of any evidence of a marriage, she was interred as "Ellen, Viscountess Bolingbroke".

== Second "marriage" ==
After this Henry moved back to Lydiard Park and after meeting Mary Elizabeth Emily Howard, a young servant girl, installed her as his housekeeper.

The couple had a formal arrangement whilst at Lydiard Park, but during Henry's absences they met in Bath and lived there as a couple, known as Mr and Mrs Wilson. In 1882 and 1885 Mary gave birth to two boys, who were kept in Bath under the eye of a nurse/governess. In 1893, when Mary became pregnant a third time, she prevailed on Henry to marry her, which he did at Bath Registry Office in 1893. The child was stillborn, but three years later she gave birth to a boy, who was christened Vernon Henry St John, the only legitimate heir to the title.

== Feud with peerage publications ==
Henry then engaged in a long-running feud with the peerage publications, including Debrett's, Dods and Burkes Peerage. In order to 'legitimise' his children so that the eldest son could inherit the title, he tried to pass them off as the offspring of his non-existent marriage to Ellen Medex. Although the peerage books had previously accepted that he was married, they began to unravel the lies and removed all reference to his marriage and any heirs apparent, instead installing one of Henry's cousins, Canon Maurice St John, as heir presumptive to the title.

== Death and scandal ==
Henry St John died in November 1899. After the funeral the existence of a wife and heir was revealed, a scandal which was reported in all the British newspapers. Mary continued to live at Lydiard Park and died in February 1940.

His nephew was the Irish-born American organist and composer Henry Gordon Thunder, Sr.

Peerage of Great Britain
| Preceded by Henry St John | Viscount Bolingbroke; 1851–1899 | Succeeded by Vernon Henry St John |
| Preceded by Henry St John | Viscount St John; 1851–1899 | Succeeded by Vernon Henry St John |
