= South Leaze =

Coordinates: 51.548°N 01.82°W

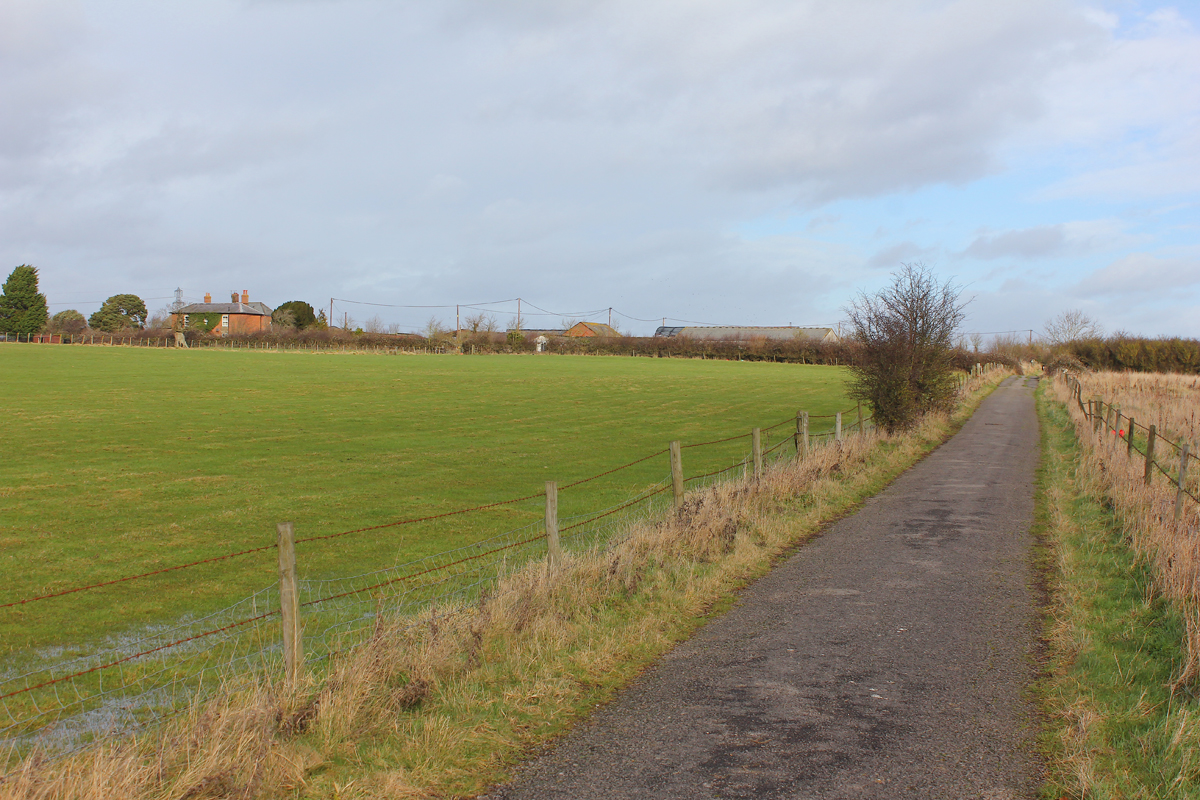
- Single track road and farmhouse in South Leaze

- Location within Wiltshire
- OS grid reference: SU1282
- Civil parish: Wroughton
- Unitary authority: Borough of Swindon
- Ceremonial county: Wiltshire
- Region: South West
- Country: England
- Sovereign state: United Kingdom
- Post town: Swindon
- Postcode district: SN1
- Dialling code: 01793
- Police: Wiltshire
- Fire: Dorset and Wiltshire
- Ambulance: South Western
- UK Parliament: South Swindon

South Leaze is a hamlet in Wroughton parish within the Borough of Swindon, Wiltshire, England. It is south of the nearby village of Toothill and is close to the Mannington Retail Park. National Cycle Route 45 passes through the hamlet. There were cottages in the hamlet as late as 2008.

In 2021, Swindon Borough Council built a tunnel underneath the M4 motorway; this will form part of the eventual connection between Hay Lane and the residential development of Wichelstowe. It has not yet been announced when the road linking Wichelstowe and South Leaze will be completed.
