= Frederick William Frohawk =

Zoological artist and lepidopterist (1861–1946)

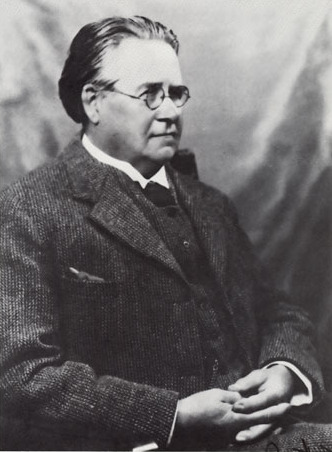
Frederick William Frohawk

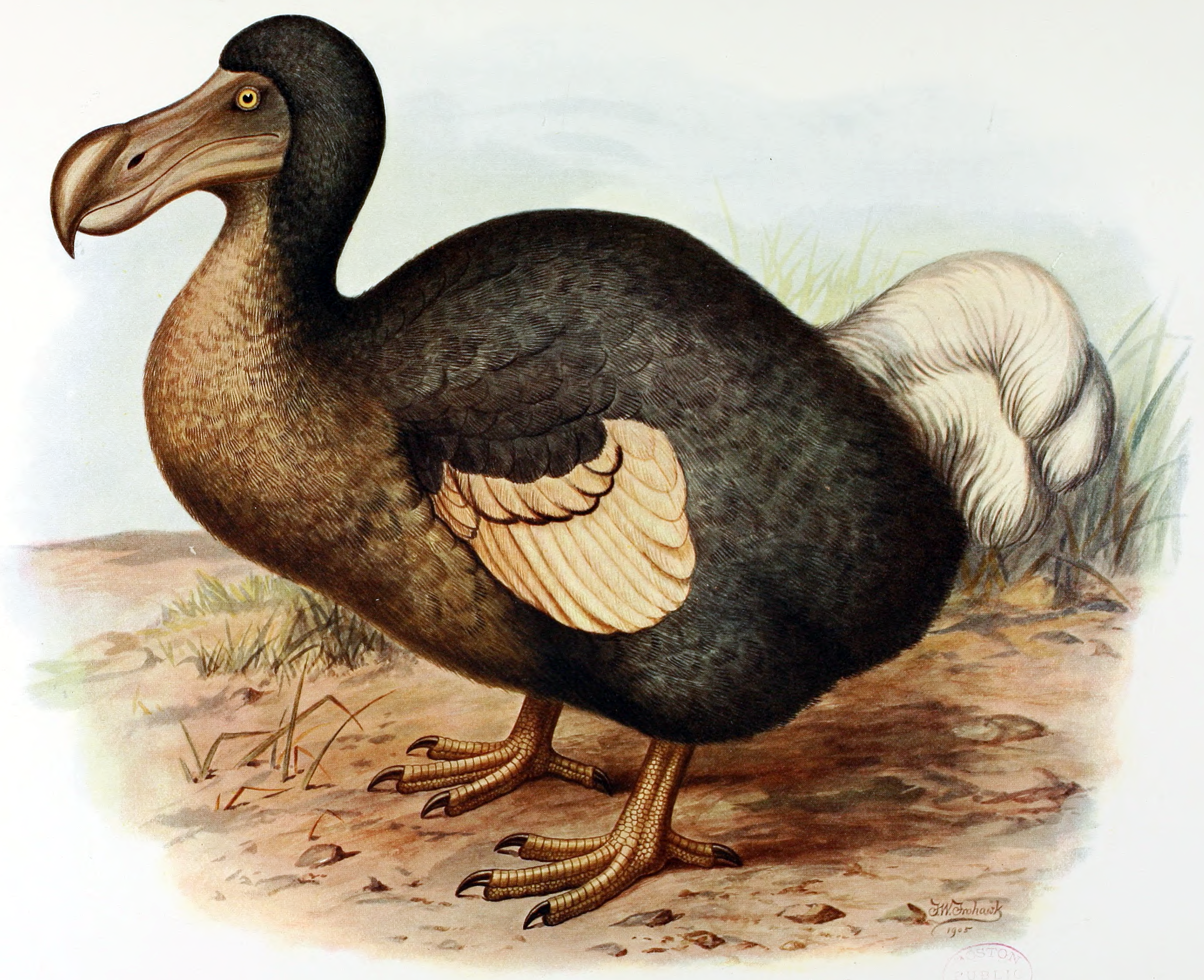
Frohawk's illustration of the extinct dodo for Walter Rothschild's Extinct Birds (1907)

Frederick William Frohawk (16 July 1861 – 10 December 1946) was an English zoological artist and lepidopterist.

Frohawk was the author of Natural History of British Butterflies (1914), The Complete Book of British Butterflies (1934) and Varieties of British Butterflies (1938).

Frohawk was born at Brisley Hall, East Dereham, Norfolk, the son of a yeoman farmer Francis Frohawk and his wife, Lydia Drage. The youngest child in his family, his interest in drawing and natural history was nurtured by his mother. At seven he spotted and caught a rare pale clouded yellow butterfly. The family moved to Great Yarmouth and later Ipswich where he found many interesting butterflies. After the death of his father around 1873, the family moved to Croydon and later South Norwood. He went to school at Norwood College and during this time contracted typhoid leading to near blindness in one eye. In 1880 the family moved to Upper Norwood and here Frohawk concentrated on illustration and obtained his first commission for illustrating The Field. Frohawk was encouraged in his work by Lord Walter Rothschild, who later bought his water-colours of butterflies.

His major butterfly works include the two volume Natural History of British Butterflies (1924) and The Complete Book of British Butterflies (1934). In 1927, a need for money forced him to sell his butterfly collection to Lord Rothschild for £1000. These are now part of the Rothschild collection in the Natural History Museum at London. He also illustrated numerous bird books, including Aves Hawaiienses: The Birds of the Sandwich Islands; and Birds of the British Isles and their Eggs with A G Butler, published around 1898.

He married Margaret Grant in June 1895 and spent the honeymoon in the New Forest. Margaret died on 16 February 1909 leaving him to care for two daughters. In 1911 he married Mabel Jane Bowman on 4 October at St James, Westminster and they had a third daughter Valezina, named after a form of the silver-washed fritillary. He was elected Fellow of the Royal Entomological Society in 1891 and made a Special Life Fellow in 1926. He died on 10 December 1946 and was buried at Headley, Surrey.

His sister Lydia was married to the equine artist Lynwood Palmer.

In 1996, his daughter Valezina, former wife of Vernon Henry St John, 6th Viscount Bolingbroke, inaugurated a commemorative sign marking the "Frohawk Ride" in the New Forest.
