= West Swindon =

Civil parish in Wiltshire, England

Coordinates: 51.558°N 1.833°W

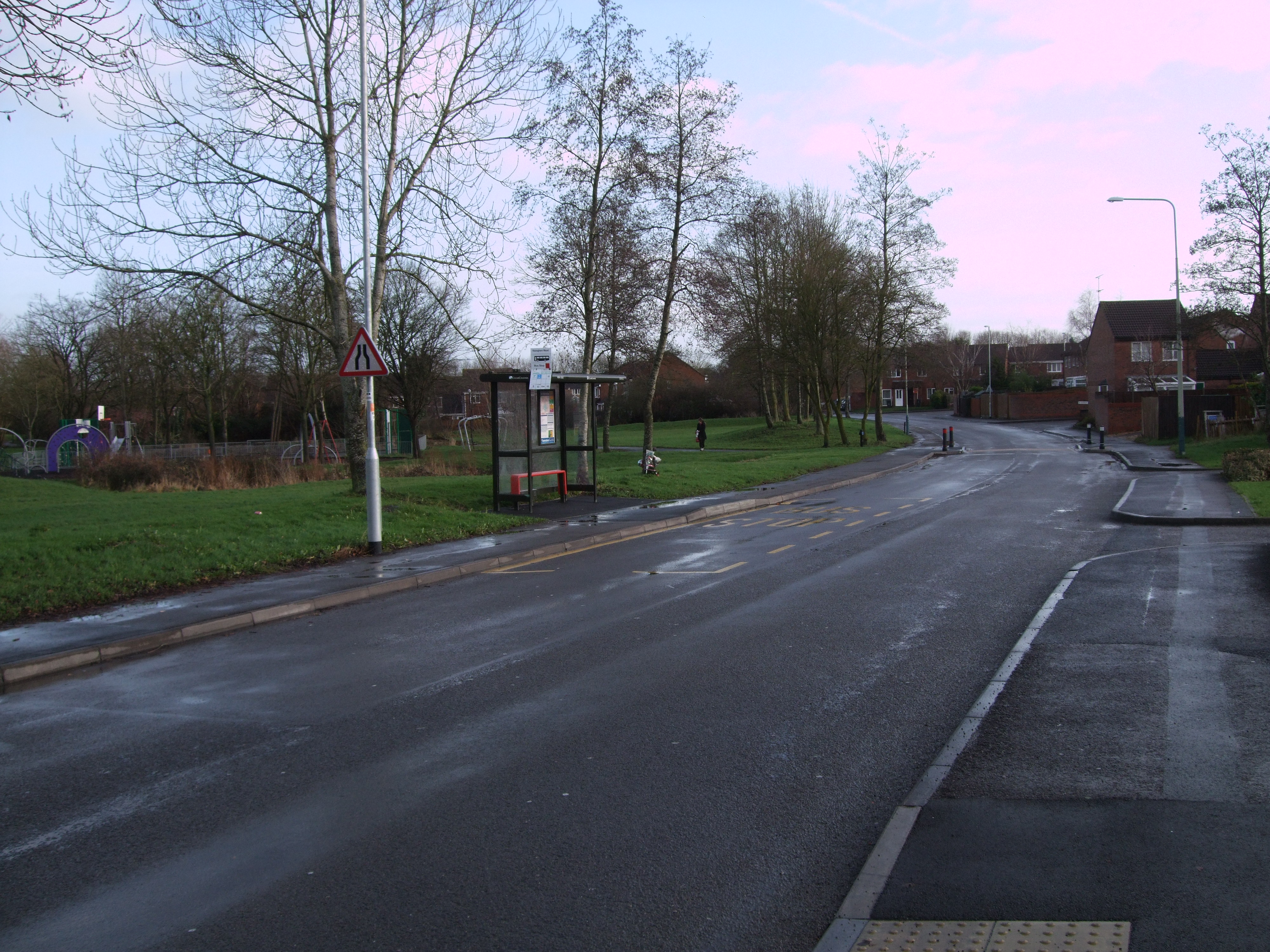
- Westlea Drive, West Swindon in 2012

- Location within Wiltshire
- Area: 9.056 km^{2} (3.497 sq mi)
- Population: 26,846 (2021 census)
  - Density: 2,964/km^{2} (7,680/sq mi)
- OS grid reference: SU117844
- Civil parish: West Swindon
- Unitary authority: Borough of Swindon
- Ceremonial county: Wiltshire
- Region: South West
- Country: England
- Sovereign state: United Kingdom
- Post town: Swindon
- Postcode district: SN5
- Dialling code: 01793
- Police: Wiltshire
- Fire: Dorset and Wiltshire
- Ambulance: South Western
- UK Parliament: Swindon South
- Website: Parish Council

West Swindon is a civil parish in the borough of Swindon, Wiltshire, England. In 2021, it had a population of 26,846.

== Geography ==
As its name suggests, the parish lies west of the central area of the town of Swindon. The southern boundary of the parish is a short stretch of the M4 motorway, immediately east of junction 16. The River Ray forms part of the eastern boundary, and in the north-east the boundary follows the Golden Valley line, the railway from Swindon to Gloucester.

== History ==
Before the 20th-century expansion of Swindon, the rural area immediately west of the town was in the civil parishes of Lydiard Millicent (to the north, including the hamlets of Roughmoor, Nine Elms and Shaw) and Lydiard Tregoze (to the south, including Toot Hill and the hamlet of Mannington). A small area in the south-west of the present West Swindon parish, around Blagrove Farm, was in Wroughton parish. The town was unparished, its western boundary following the Midland and South Western Junction Railway and (further north) the River Ray.

The development of West Swindon began in the 1970s at Toothill. The 1980s saw development at Freshbrook and the construction of the West Swindon Centre complex, with a supermarket, shops, a public library, and a multi-sport building called the Link Centre with an ice rink and swimming pool. To the east are office buildings and light industry, including the Renault Centre, designed by Norman Foster and built in 1982 as the UK headquarters of the Renault car company; it is now known as the Spectrum Building and occupied by other businesses.

A community governance review in 2015–2016 led to the creation of West Swindon parish, effective from April 2017. Besides the modern housing area, the parish extends west to include Lydiard Park, which had been bought by the Corporation of Swindon in 1943. The park was the grounds of the 17th-century mansion known as Lydiard House. Today, Swindon Borough Council operate the grounds as a country park and occasional events venue, while the house is a hotel, wedding venue and museum.

In 2023, a new Community Diagnostic Centre in West Swindon was announced. The same year, the former post office reopened. In September 2023, the West Swindon library was flooded after heavy rain, which necessitated the replacement of the library's entire carpeting.

== Churches ==
The 13th-century St Mary's church, built as the parish church of Lydiard Tregoze, stands next to Lydiard House. A new church, Holy Trinity, was built at Shaw in 1989 to serve the expanding suburbs. Further modern churches are at Freshbrook (affiliated to the Fellowship of Independent Evangelical Churches) and Toothill (ecumenical). All four churches are members of the West Swindon and Lydiard Tregoze Church Partnership.

== Governance ==
The first tier of local government is West Swindon Parish Council. For elections to Swindon Borough Council, the parish is covered by three wards: Shaw ward (in the north) and Lydiard and Freshbook ward (south-west) are entirely within the parish, while Mannington and Western ward in the south-east straddles the parish boundary to include Even Swindon. Each ward elects three councillors. For Westminster elections, the parish is part of the Swindon South constituency.
