= Lydiard Millicent =

Village in Wiltshire, England

Coordinates: 51.572°N 1.862°W

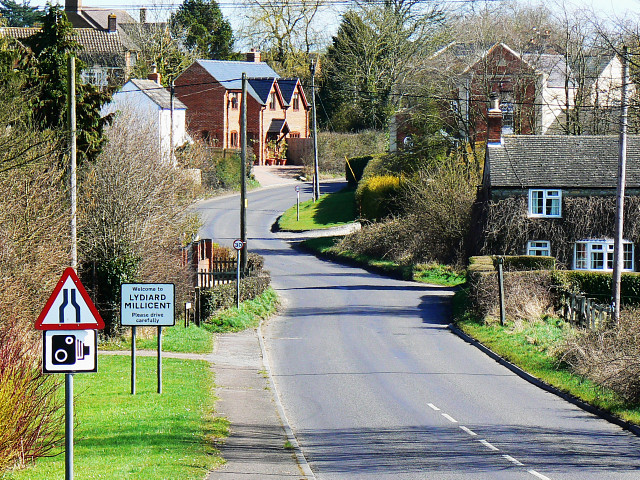

- Location within Wiltshire
- Population: 1,570 (in 2011)
- OS grid reference: SU097859
- Unitary authority: Wiltshire Council
- Ceremonial county: Wiltshire
- Region: South West
- Country: England
- Sovereign state: United Kingdom
- Post town: Swindon
- Postcode district: SN5
- Dialling code: 01793
- Police: Wiltshire
- Fire: Dorset and Wiltshire
- Ambulance: South Western
- UK Parliament: Chippenham
- Website: Parish Council

Lydiard Millicent is a village and civil parish in Wiltshire, England, about 3 1/2 miles (6 km) west of the centre of Swindon. The parish contains the hamlets of Lydiard Green, Lydiard Plain, Greatfield and Green Hill; in the northeast the parish extends to Common Platt, which is now contiguous with the Peatmoor area of Swindon.

The Woodbridge Brook rises near the village.

== History ==
The first part of the name of the village may be derived from the Old English for 'gate by the ford'. Millicent comes from Millicent de Clinton, who owned the manor in the 12th century and was the wife of William de Clinton; the suffix distinguishes the manor from its neighbour to the south, Lydiard Tregoze.

Lydiard Manor is mentioned in the Domesday survey of 1086, owned by Geoffrey de Clinton, with 25 households. There was an extensive Romano-British ceramic manufacturing industry on and around Shaw Ridge, on land formerly within the two Lydiard parishes, mainly in the 2nd century. In the 13th century, most of the parish was within Braydon Forest; later, the forest was only in the west of the parish.

Parkside Farmhouse is from the 16th century, altered in the 18th. Manor Farm has an 18th-century dovecote; the present Manor House was built in 1965–6 on the site of an earlier house which burned down in 1880. Lydiard House, west of the village towards Lydiard Green, was built in 1830; a stable block was added nearby in 1840.

A Primitive Methodist chapel was built in 1863 at Lydiard Green, of red brick in plain classical style. The building was still in use in 2004 but by 2009 had become a private house.

A National School was built at The Butts in 1864, and enlarged several times; in 1902 the attendance was 115. Children of all ages were educated until 1930, when those over 11 transferred to Purton. Enrollment fell, then increased in 1965 on the closure of the school at Lydiard Tregoze. A new school was opened on the other side of the lane in 2011.

In the 19th century the parish boundary in the northeast was the River Ray, beyond the Cheltenham railway. In 1981, the eastern end of the parish – about a third of its area, including the hamlets of Nine Elms, Roughmoor and Shaw – was transferred to Thamesdown borough, together with parts of the parishes of Purton and Lydiard Tregoze. This area was subsequently developed, largely for housing, as the Swindon suburbs of Shaw, Middleleaze, Nine Elms, Hillmead, Roughmoor, Peatmoor and Common Platt, all within the area known as West Swindon, which gained civil parish status in 2017.

== Parish church ==
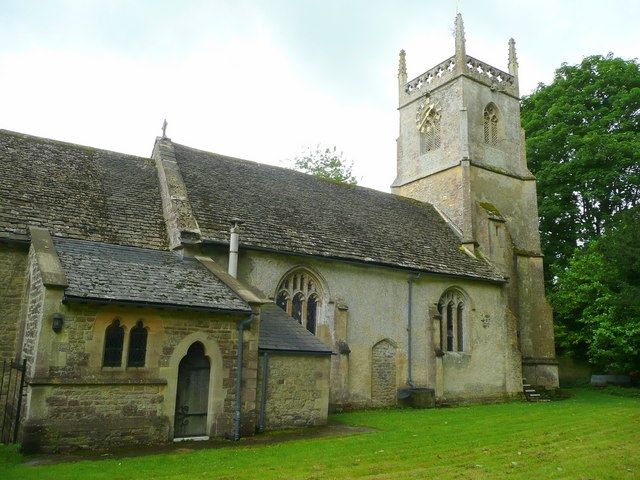
All Saints' Church

There was probably a church at Lydiard Millicent in the late 11th century. The present parish church is a rebuilding from the 14th century; the nave is from that period and was re-roofed in the 15th or 16th. The chancel was largely rebuilt in 1871 and the west vestry (which now houses the organ) was created in 1924.

The font, a limestone bowl decorated with intersecting arcades, is from the 12th century. The tower has six bells, three of them cast by the elder Abraham Rudhall in 1712. The east window, installed in 1963, is by M. E. Aldrich Rope.

The building was designated as Grade II* listed in 1955. The churchyard cross has a medieval limestone shaft; in the 19th century it was provided with a base and a new head.

The benefice was united with Lydiard Tregoze in 1956; the incumbent lived at Lydiard Millicent. The two parishes were united in 1981 and following the 1989 building of a church in the Swindon suburb of Shaw, the parish was renamed West Swindon and the Lydiards in 1996. Further reorganisation in 2017 separated the Lydiards and created the benefice of North West Swindon and Lydiard Millicent where All Saints' is the sole church.

The parish registers kept in the Wiltshire and Swindon History Centre cover the years 1579–1968 (baptisms), 1580–1992 (marriages), and 1580–1988 (burials).

A substantial rectory house was built southwest of the church in 1855–7, replacing an earlier house. Northern European in style, with rock-faced limestone walls dressed with Bath stone, English Heritage describe it as "a fine example of a mid C19 rectory of substance". The house was sold after a smaller house was built nearby in 1951–2.

== Amenities ==
The village school continues as Lydiard Millicent C of E VC Primary School, which also provides an after school club run by working parents. There is a parish hall (1965), a recreation field with changing rooms (2002), a used car garage, and a pub, the Sun Inn.

== See also ==
- Samuel Wilson Warneford – held the advowson of the rectory, 1809–1855
