= Ballard's Ash =

Hamlet in Wiltshire, England

Coordinates: 51.558°N 1.905°W

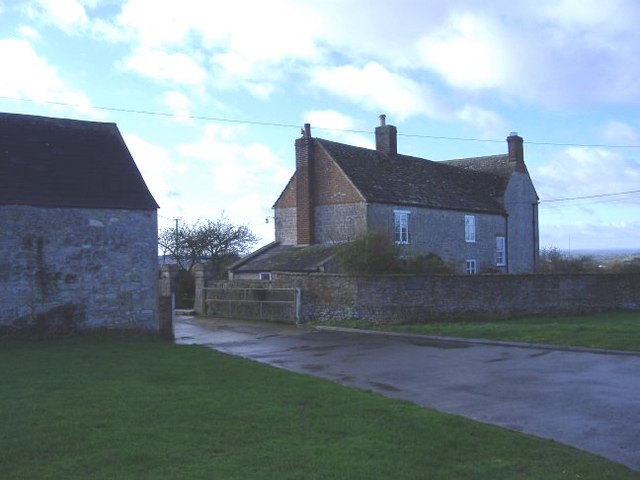
- Ballard's Ash farm

- Location within Wiltshire
- OS grid reference: SU067844
- Civil parish: Lydiard Tregoze
- Unitary authority: Wiltshire
- Ceremonial county: Wiltshire
- Region: South West
- Country: England
- Sovereign state: United Kingdom
- Post town: Swindon
- Postcode district: SN4
- Dialling code: 01793
- Police: Wiltshire
- Fire: Dorset and Wiltshire
- Ambulance: South Western
- UK Parliament: Chippenham

Ballard's Ash is a hamlet in north Wiltshire, England. It lies in Lydiard Tregoze parish, just beyond the northern outskirts of Royal Wootton Bassett, on the B4042 road towards Brinkworth and Malmesbury.
