= Digital Retro =

- Author: Gordon Laing
- Language: English
- Publication date: 2004
- Publication place: United Kingdom
- Media type: Print
- ISBN: 9780782143300
- OCLC: 56881016

Digital Retro: The Evolution and Design of the Personal Computer is a coffee table book about the history of home computers and personal computers. It was written by Gordon Laing, a former editor of Personal Computer World magazine and covers the period from 1975 to 1988 (the era before widespread adoption of PC compatibility). Its contents cover home computers, along with some business models and video game consoles, but hardware such as minicomputers and mainframes is excluded.

In writing the book, the author's research included finding and interviewing some of those who worked on the featured hardware and founded the companies. Such hardware was borrowed from private collections and computer museums, with more than thirty coming from the Museum of Computing in Swindon.

== Contents ==
Topics covered include choice of video chip and how designers of sound chips later proceeded to make synthesisers. A number of British computers "that most Americans have probably never encountered in person" are included, such as the Acorn Atom, Dragon 32 and Grundy NewBrain. Almost forty computers are included in total.

== Reception ==
It has been described as a "beautifully illustrated" "well written" book which "drips detail", with the author being noted as a "perfectionist". The photographs depict "external views of each machine from several angles". Omissions (such as the Apricot PC) were noted by Mike Magee in The Inquirer. There are internal photographs in a few cases.

Writing in The Register, Lance Davis commented on the importance of such books, stating "... history isn't just about dead people who wore crowns."
