= Woodbridge Brook =

River in Wiltshire, England

Location
- Country: England
- Region: West of England
- District: Wiltshire

Physical characteristics
- Source: Midgehall Copse
  - location: Lydiard Millicent, Wiltshire, England
  - coordinates: 51.5605°N 1.9115°W
  - elevation: 374 ft (114 m)
- Mouth: Bristol Avon
  - location: Malmesbury, Wiltshire, England
  - coordinates: 51.5783°N 2.0805°W
  - elevation: 213 ft (65 m)
- Length: 9 mi (14 km), westerly
- Discharge
  - average: 20.5 cu ft/s (0.58 m^{3}/s)
  - minimum: 0 cu ft/s (0 m^{3}/s)

Basin features
- River system: Bristol Avon

The Woodbridge Brook is a tributary of the Bristol Avon. It rises near Lydiard Millicent in Wiltshire in the west of England and flows in a generally westerly direction, joining the Avon below Malmesbury. The brook has a mean flow of 20.5 cubic feet per second (0.58 m^{3}/s) and the waters were used in the past to power watermills.

== Course ==
The Woodbridge Brook rises at Midgehall Copse, just north of the M4 motorway, in the parish of Lydiard Millicent. It flows first in a northerly direction, and then to the west through Webbs Wood, passing to the north of Brinkworth. Continuing westwards through Garsdon Wood it begins to turn to the south and is joined on the right bank by two unnamed streams which have their sources at Braydon Wood and Charlton respectively. The stream now flows almost due south to Crab Mill Farm and then turns west again to join the Bristol Avon, just above Cowbridge to the east of Malmesbury.

== History ==
A watermill at Lydiard Millicent was recorded in the Domesday Book in 1086. Other mill buildings at Crab Mill and Garsdon Mill survive but not in working order.

== Hydrology ==
The brook has a mean flow of 20.5 cubic feet per second (0.58 m^{3}/s) as recorded by the Environment Agency gauging station at Crabb Mill. No maximum flow is recorded but a minimum of zero was recorded on 20 September 1976, during the 1976 heatwave.
