= Okus =

Suburb of Swindon, England

Coordinates: 51.551°N 01.793°W

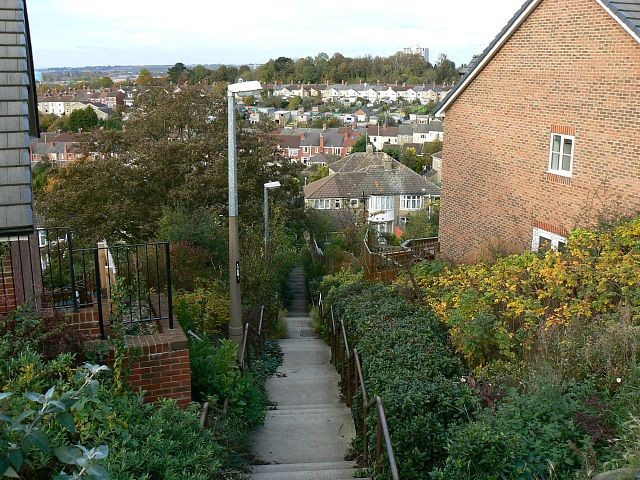
- Footpath from Okus Road to Kingshill Road

- Location within Wiltshire
- OS grid reference: SU1483
- Unitary authority: Borough of Swindon
- Ceremonial county: Wiltshire
- Region: South West
- Country: England
- Sovereign state: United Kingdom
- Post town: Swindon
- Postcode district: SN1
- Dialling code: 01793
- Police: Wiltshire
- Fire: Dorset and Wiltshire
- Ambulance: South Western
- UK Parliament: South Swindon

Okus is a suburb of Swindon, Wiltshire, England. It is an elevated area situated around 1 mile (1.6 km) south-west of the town centre and is predominantly residential. Key features in the area include Commonweal School, a secondary school with academy status.

Nearby areas include Kingshill to the north, Old Town to the east, Wichelstowe to the south and Rushey Platt to the west.

== History ==
Okus was originally a small hamlet separate from the Swindon urban area on a hill just east of the Wilts and Berks Canal, consisting in the mid-19th century of Okus Farm—which was owned by the Goddard family—and a few cottages.

Quarries were dug in the area in the late 19th century, known as Okus Quarry; the remains of which are designated as a geological Site of Special Scientific Interest, within the grounds of Commonweal School. Around the same time, the Victoria Hospital was established at the eastern end of Okus Road.

During World War II, Okus had a large presence of American military personnel who were billeted along Okus Road. Victoria Hospital also served as a treatment site for serious medical cases from Chiseldon Camp, about 8 kilometres (5.0 mi) to the south-east. The area expanded around the 1950s with the addition of industrial units.

The Princess Margaret Hospital (PMH), constructed and opened in phases between 1959 and 1966, increased the prominence of Okus. It was the first purpose-built general hospital to be funded by the NHS. Throughout the latter half of the 20th century, the PMH was the hallmark feature of the area. Additional housing was built at the western end of Okus Road in the 1970s.

After the PMH closed in 2002, the site was demolished in 2004 and re-developed as a residential area in the mid-to-late 2000s. Marlborough House, a Child and Adolescent Mental Health Services facility, is the only remaining section of the old hospital still in operation.

== Area and amenities ==
The majority of Okus's housing on the former PMH site is built in a modern style with three-storey houses and flats frequently featuring.

A recreational green, Angel Ridge, is located at the south of Okus. The name alludes to the hospital formerly on the site. Angel Ridge features a play area and open green spaces. Another small park is at Celsus Grove.

Okus has a GP surgery and convenience store. Commonweal School, a secondary school with academy status, is sited on the eastern edge of Okus, crossing into Old Town; it has a sixth form and has provision for students aged 11–18. Okus does not have a primary school of its own; children from the area usually attend Lethbridge Primary School or King William Street Church of England Primary School in nearby Old Town.

As for public transport, Okus is served by Swindon's Bus Company route 22, providing links to Swindon town centre and Swindon railway station.
