= Commonweal School =

The Commonweal School
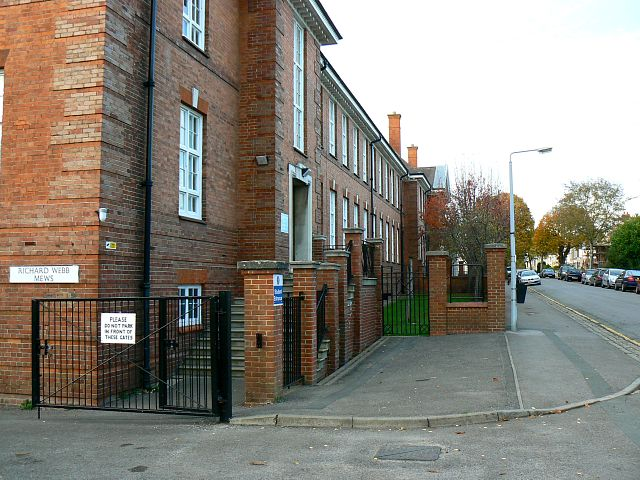

Location
- The Mall; Swindon, Wiltshire, SN1 4JE; England; 51°32′57″N 1°47′16″W

Information
- Type: Academy
- Motto: Salubritas et Industria (Health and Industry)
- Established: September 1927
- Specialist: Performing Arts
- Department for Education URN: 137190 Tables
- Ofsted: Reports
- Chairwoman of Governors: Jokie Bakker
- Head Teacher: Charles Drew
- Gender: Co-educational
- Age: 11 to 19
- Enrolment: 1,442
- Colours: Blue , Black and Silver
- Website: www.commonweal.co.uk

The Commonweal School is a secondary school and sixth form (also referred to as Commonweal Sixth or simply C6) in the Old Town area of Swindon, Wiltshire, England.

== History ==
The Commonweal School was opened as a grammar school in 1927, and most of the first pupils transferred from the College and Euclid Street secondary schools. The original building was designed for 410 pupils. September 1939 saw a sudden rise in numbers to 530 as evacuees arrived, half of them from East Ham Grammar School, London.

In 1965, it became a Senior High School, taking pupils of all abilities aged 14 to 18. There was another re-organisation in 1983 when Commonweal became a seven-form entry comprehensive school for pupils aged 11 to 16, therefore losing its sixth form.

Its academy status was awarded on 1 August 2011; previously, it had been a foundation school. An expansion in September 2014 saw the reinstatement of its sixth form, known as C6.

== Leadership ==
'Tam' Hartley was the school's first headmaster. Doctor C.E Jones was appointed headmaster in 1932, and his name is commemorated in the shield awarded to the house that wins the annual Sports Day. Keith Defter become headmaster in 1998. Robert Linnegar, formerly deputy headmaster, took over in September 2017 and retired at the end of August 2021. Charles 'Chas' Drew was appointed to the post in September 2021.

As of summer 2026, Hazel McKay is the current Head of Sixth Form. McKay was previous Head of C6 Student Support and took over as Head from James Matcham who had previously held the position since sixth form's reinstatement in 2014. Matcham is now an assistant headteacher as part of the main school leadership.

== Commonweal Sixth Form ==
In December 2012, it was announced by head teacher Keith Defter that the Department for Education had accepted the school's bid for a sixth form. This opened in September 2014 with places for up to 300 students in new, purpose-built facilities such as a café, rehearsal rooms, recording studio, an editing suite and a 150-seat auditorium, funded by the Department for Education. The sixth form provides a range of academic courses, alongside a varied enrichment programme.

== Academic performance ==
At the most recent Ofsted full inspection, in November 2017, the school received a rating of 'Good' in all categories, leading to an overall effectiveness rating of 'Good'. In the latest school inspection, in June 2023, the school received a rating of 'Good.'

== Alumni ==
- Keith Browning, atmospheric scientist
- Justin Hayward, musician
- Lyndon Ogbourne, actor
