= Museum of Computing =

Museum in Swindon, England

Coordinates: 51.559071°N 1.781118°W

The Museum of Computing in Swindon, England (formally The Museum of Computing @ Swindon) is dedicated to preserving and displaying examples of early computers. It was the first United Kingdom museum exclusively dedicated to the history of computing, and opened in February 2003.

== Aims ==
The museum aims to preserve the history of computing, to be used as a valuable educational resource and as an information repository for historians, collectors and the media, and to illustrate this history in an entertaining way.

== Exhibits ==
The museum includes working machines and interactive activities. The exhibitions have included the Pong to PlayStation exhibition. More than thirty computers were lent to Gordon Laing, a former editor of Personal Computer World magazine, in connection with the writing of his 2004 book Digital Retro.

== Notable events ==
The exhibition "Calculators from the Abacus to the Microchip", was launched by Sir Clive Sinclair in March 2006.

In April 2007, the museum was honoured by a visit from Prince Edward, Duke of Kent, patron of the British Computer Society.

The museum moved to 6–7 Theatre Square in July 2009, between the library and the theatre.

In May 2010, the museum celebrated the 30th anniversary of the video game Pac-Man with a real life Pac-Man game and a special exhibition at the museum all day.

In March 2011, the 'Gaming on the Go' exhibition celebrated 35 years of the handheld games console.

== Structure ==
The Museum of Computing is a not-for-profit organisation, largely run by volunteers. In 2022, the company had one employee and one director, Jeremy Holt.
