= Toothill, Swindon =

Suburb of Swindon, England

Coordinates: 51.553°N 1.821°W

Toothill
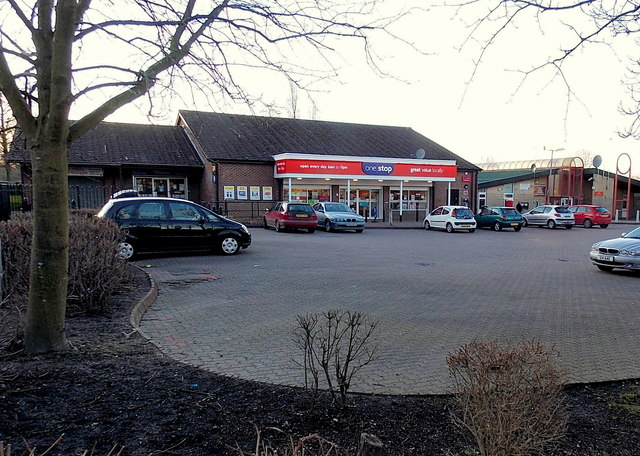
- Toothill Village Centre in 2013

- Location within Wiltshire
- Population: 4,539 (ONS, 2021)
- Civil parish: West Swindon
- Unitary authority: Borough of Swindon
- Ceremonial county: Wiltshire
- Region: South West
- Country: England
- Sovereign state: United Kingdom
- Post town: SWINDON
- Postcode district: SN
- Dialling code: 01793
- Police: Wiltshire
- Fire: Dorset and Wiltshire
- Ambulance: South Western
- UK Parliament: Swindon South

Toothill is a suburb in Swindon, Wiltshire, England, located atop its namesake hill around 2 miles (3 km) southwest of the town centre. Constructed in the 1970s, Toothill was the first area to be developed within what is now West Swindon parish.

Contiguous with Freshbrook to the west, Toothill is bounded by the dual-carriageway Great Western Way (A3102) to the southeast, and Tewkesbury Way to the north. Nearby areas include Wichelstowe, approximately 1 mile (2 km) to the east, and Westlea about 0.6 miles (1 km) to the north.

The area is predominately residential, with a local village centre and multiple small parks.

== History ==
Toothill's name is derived from the Old English word "tōt-hyll", meaning "lookout hill" or "watchtower". The site has been occupied since at least Roman Britain; archaeological surveys in the early 1970s revealed a number of Roman kilns in the area. It was once a small hamlet consisting only of a farm and a few cottages, lying just off the old A420, formerly the main route between Bristol and Oxford. Part of the former major route now runs through the suburban area as a residential street.

Toothill Farm was first mentioned in 1594. It was the site of the ancient "Antiock's Well", famous for its alleged miraculous and healing properties. The farmhouse still exists today, now surrounded by modern housing.

Toothill was included in the 1968 "Silver Book", a development proposal document which envisaged a dramatic westwards expansion of Swindon, with an urban area absorbing and stretching beyond Purton, transforming the town with a population of 100,000 in 1961 into a city of 400,000 by 2000.

While only a third of the proposed western expansion area was developed prior to the turn of the millennium, Toothill was West Swindon's first suburban area to be built. Infrastructure works commenced in 1974, and the first houses were occupied by April 1976.

== Governance ==
Toothill is within the West Swindon civil parish. Along with Grange Park and Freshbrook, the area elects three councillors for the Lydiard, Freshbrook & Toothill ward of Swindon Borough Council, a unitary authority. The parish is within the UK parliamentary constituency of Swindon South.

== Amenities ==
The local centre has a small supermarket, Toothill Methodist Church, and a former pub which reopened in 2026 as a community hub and bar. The hub is operated by a community interest company established in 2018, which received £1 million from the National Lottery Community Fund.

The local primary school is Hazelwood School, which is one of many managed by the Lift Schools trust.
