= Freshbrook =

Suburb of Swindon, England

Coordinates: 51°33′03″N 1°50′12″W

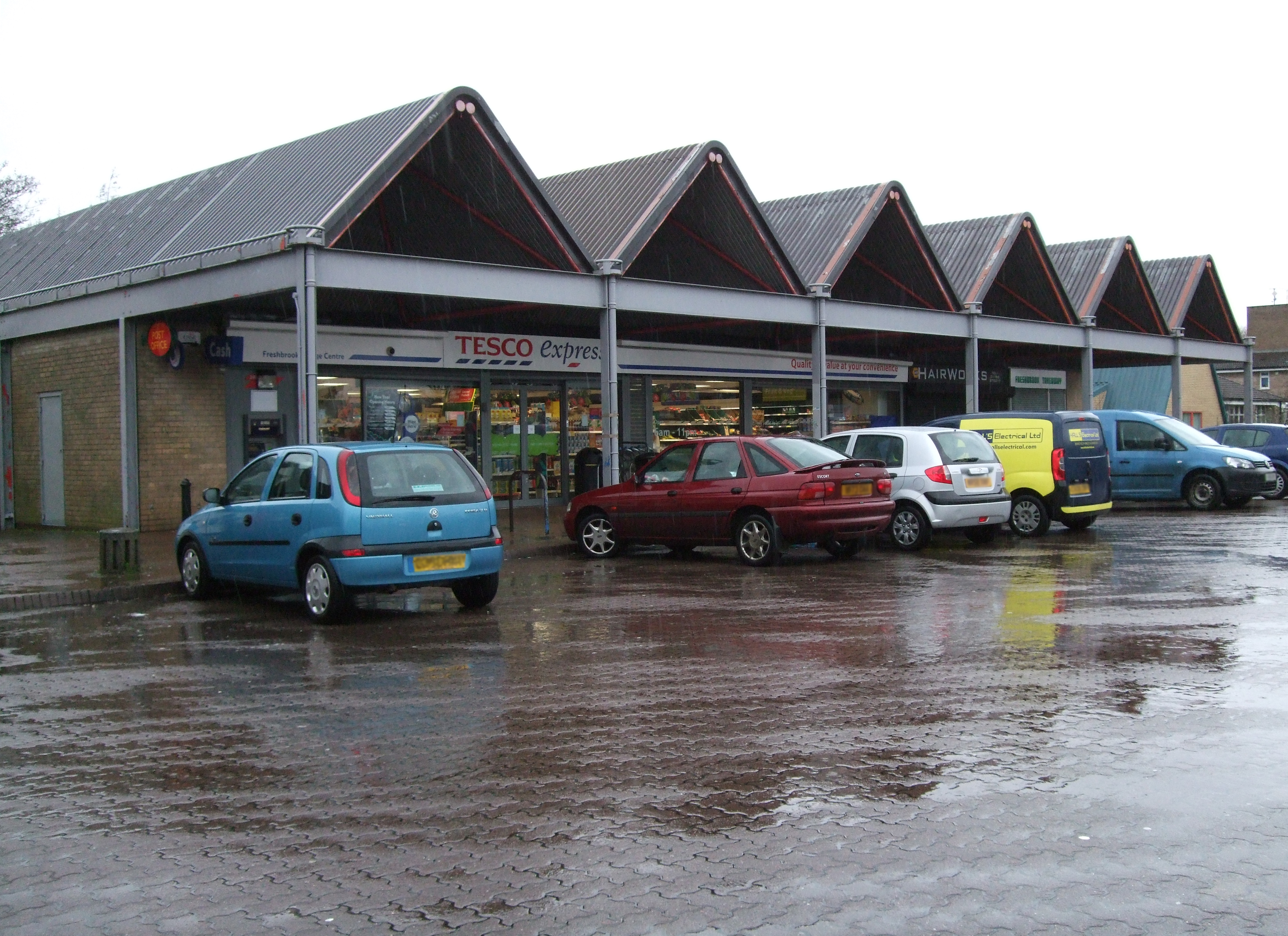
- Freshbrook Village Centre in 2012

- Location within Wiltshire
- Civil parish: West Swindon
- Unitary authority: Borough of Swindon
- Ceremonial county: Wiltshire
- Region: South West
- Country: England
- Sovereign state: United Kingdom
- Post town: SWINDON
- Postcode district: SN
- Dialling code: 01793
- Police: Wiltshire
- Fire: Dorset and Wiltshire
- Ambulance: South Western
- UK Parliament: Swindon South

Freshbrook is a suburb in the west of Swindon, Wiltshire, England, located around 4 kilometres (2 mi) southwest of the town centre and close to junction 16 of the M4 motorway. Most houses in the area are found in culs-de-sac, except for those on the few main roads. The suburb is served by the shops of a small "village centre" and has a primary school.

Adjacent areas are Grange Park to the north and west, Toothill to the east, Blagrove industrial estate to the south, and Windmill Hill business park to the west.

== History ==
Freshbrook was built in the early 1980s as part of the 'West Swindon' urban extension of Swindon. A large housing development, Wichelstowe, was built southeast of Freshbrook, from 2009; it is separated from Freshbrook by Great Western Way and the Great Western Railway Line.

== Education ==
Freshbrook has one school, Millbrook Primary School, which had 329 pupils in July 2022. From 1988 a second primary school, Windmill Hill, was housed in a prefabricated building; as the local birth rate fell, in 2008 the building was closed and the school was merged with the school previously called Freshbrook School to form Millbrook. The Windmill Hill school building was destroyed by fire in 2011 in a suspected arson. A Church of England primary school, Oliver Tomkins, is nearby in Toothill.

For secondary education, pupils from Freshbrook can attend Lydiard Park Academy (in nearby Grange Park), Bradon Forest School in Purton, or the Ridgeway School and Sixth Form College in Wroughton.

== Leisure and recreation ==
The West Swindon district centre in Westlea is just north-east of Freshbrook. On the site are the Link Centre which has a swimming pool, national-size ice rink, other sports facilities and a library; also an Asda supermarket and other retail outlets.

== Governance ==
Freshbrook is within West Swindon parish. Along with Grange Park and part of Toothill, the area elects three councillors for the Lydiard, Freshbrook and Toothill ward of Swindon Borough Council, a unitary authority. Freshbrook forms part of the parliamentary constituency of South Swindon.

At the 2011 census, the population of the electoral ward (then called Freshbrook and Grange Park, with slightly different boundaries) was 9,889.
