= William Eastmead =

William Eastmead (died 1847?) was an English dissenting minister.

== Life ==
Eastmead was pastor of a congregation at Kirkby Moorside, Yorkshire, and died about 1847.

== Works ==
He wrote:

- ‘Observations on Human Life,’ London, 1814, 1825.
- ‘The Perfections of the Works of Christ.’
- ‘Historia Rievallensis; containing the History of Kirkby Moorside, and an Account of the most Important Places in its Vicinity. To which is prefixed a Dissertation on the Animal Remains and other Curious Phenomena in the recently discovered Cave at Kirkdale,’ Thirsk, 1824, pp. 488, dedicated to Francis Wrangham, archdeacon of Cleveland.
