= Swindon Loco Yard =

Railway maintenance depot in Swindon, Wiltshire

Swindon TMD
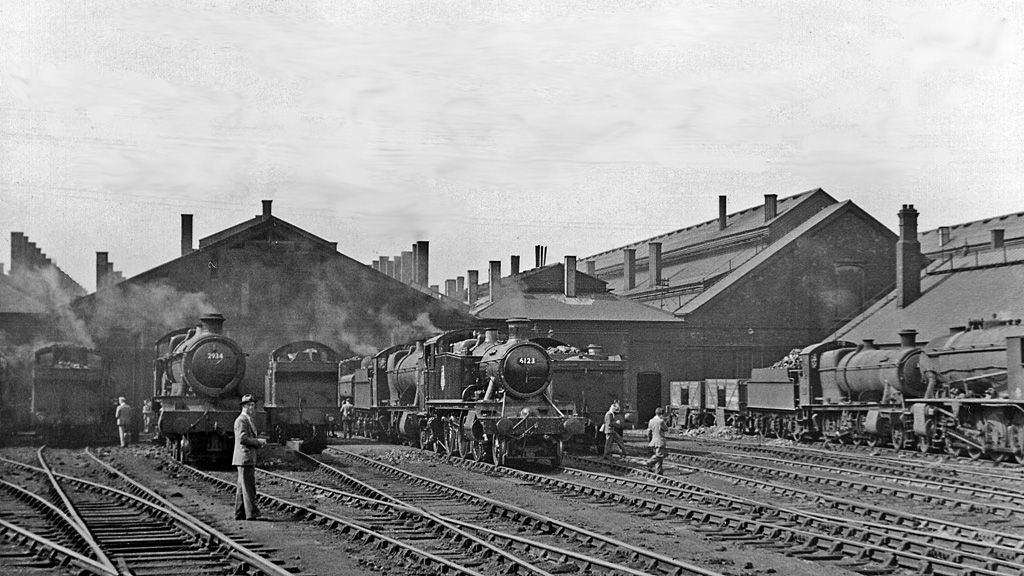
- The depot in 1950
- Interactive map of Swindon TMD

Location
- Location: Swindon, Wiltshire
- Coordinates: 51.567°N 1.7824°W
- OS grid: SU15088542

Characteristics
- Owner: British Rail
- Depot code: SW (1973 - )
- Type: Diesel

History
- Opened: 1842
- Former depot code: 82C (1 February 1950 - 5 May 1973)

Swindon TMD is a traction maintenance depot located in Swindon, Wiltshire, England. The depot is situated on the Great Western Main Line and is near Swindon station.

The depot code is SW.

== History ==
Between 1957 and 1993, Class 03, 05, 08 shunters, Class 22, Class 52, Class 37 and 47 locomotives could be seen at the depot.
