= St Augustine's Church, Even Swindon =

Church in Swindon, Wiltshire, England

Coordinates: 51.5663°N 1.8014°W

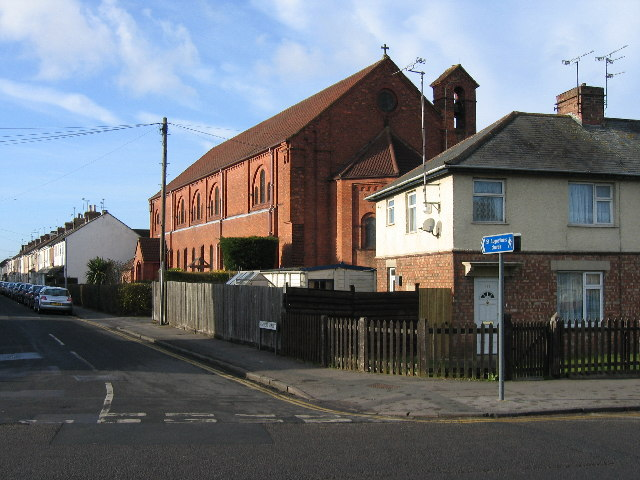
St Augustine's Church, Swindon, from Rodbourne Road

The Church of St. Augustine is an Anglican parish church in Even Swindon (also known locally as Rodbourne), an area of the town of Swindon, Wiltshire, England. The church was built in 1907 to serve the spiritual needs of people moving to Swindon for employment at the Great Western Railway Works. It is in the Diocese of Bristol and the province of Canterbury, and is dedicated to St. Augustine of Canterbury.

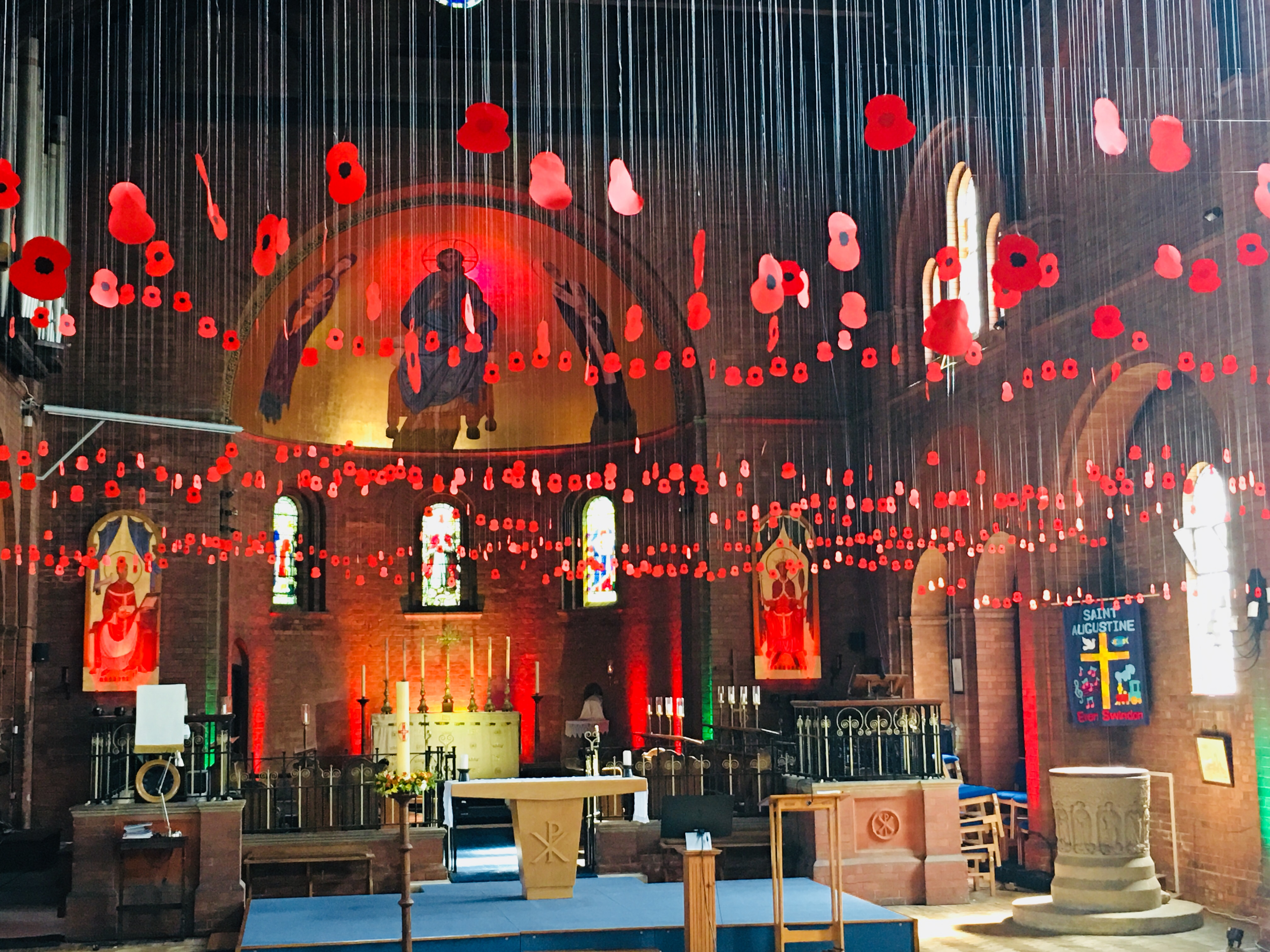
More than 1,000 poppies hanging in the church to commemorate the 100th anniversary of the Armistice in 2018

== Earlier churches ==
In what is thought to be a former church schoolroom built around 1873, the Rodbourne Cheney District Room became a mission chapel in the early 1880s within the parish of St Mary Rodbourne Cheney. The inventory records that the licence holding Divine Services was acquired on 2 April 1881. The earliest known record of a baptism dates from 1885.

The Rev W Mould, vicar of St Mary's and also chaplain to Queen Victoria, found difficulty in covering services at the chapel and made arrangements for St Mark's Church (another 'railway' church) to cover services and pastoral work.

On 26 October 1904, Rev Henry Harvey was licensed as missionary curate in St Augustine's district. He went on to serve the church in Rodbourne for a total of 29 years, was made Honorary Chaplain to the Bishop, and on completion of 25 years' service was made an Honorary Canon of Bristol Cathedral.

== Construction and architecture ==
The building was designed by W. A. H. Masters, who also designed St Luke's Church, Broad Street, Swindon, and St Philip's, Upper Stratton.

The foundation stone of St Augustine's was laid on 13 April 1907 amid much ceremony, and was the first time that the Freemasons in Wiltshire were involved in a church service. The church in its current state was consecrated on 25 January 1908. The bricks were paid for by the parishioners and cost one old penny each. A shortfall in funding meant that the side aisles, porches, bell tower and further chapels were not built.

It is one of the few churches in the south of England, and one of two in Swindon, to be built in the basilica style, and consists of a large nave of six wide bays and a small polygonal apse, with a walled choir surrounded by aisles. There is no physical division between nave and choir in the main building, so it is effectively a large hall. The vestry and lady chapel are at the north-east corner of the church. The lancet windows are in neo-Romanesque style. The building was designated as Grade II listed in 1970.

The church is approximately 120 ft long (37 m), 40 ft wide (12 m) and the nave roof reaches about 50 ft (15 m); the apse arch is about 30 ft high (9.1 m). The single bell in the north-east turret weighs four and a half hundredweight, or 504 pounds (229 kg).

== Interior ==
The font is an exact replica of the fine Norman font at St Leonard's Church, Stanton Fitzwarren. It is divided into ten compartments, each with a Latin inscription. The first, Eclesia stands for the church – and the carving is of the crowned Divine Bride, holding the sacred chalice and killing evil (depicted as a serpent) with the stem of the cross. The second compartment, inscribed Cherubim shows a six winged cherubim, with its eyes covered to show its spiritual nature. The Cherubim holds a sword to show it is guardian of the Church.

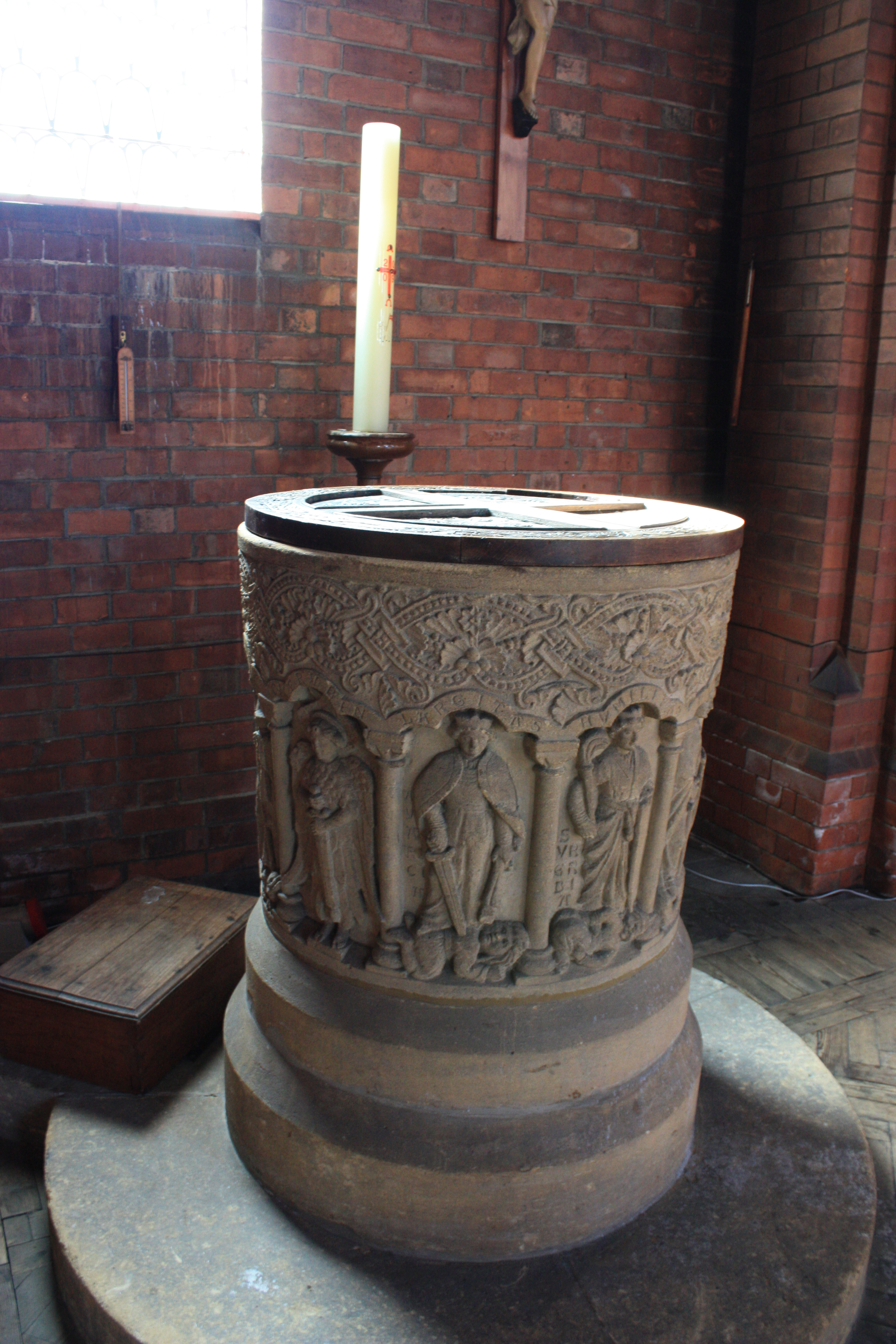
The font at St Augustine's with depictions of good overcoming evil, a replica of the font at Stanton Fitzwarren

The other eight compartments show eight crowned knights holding shields and weapons. These represent the goodly Christian Virtues and they are depicted dwarfing figures, which represent the evil vices fighting in the baptised soul. Details of these remaining compartments are:

- Largitas v Avaricia (Bounty overcoming Avarice)
- Humilitas v Superbia (Humility overcoming pride)
- Pietas v Discordia (Gentleness overcoming strife)
- Misericordia v Invidia (Mercy overcoming envy)
- Modestia v Ebrietas (Sobriety overcoming Drunkenness and excess)
- Temperancia v Luxuria (Temperance overcoming Wantonness)
- Pacientcia v Ira (Patience overcoming Anger)
- Pucicicia v Libido (Chastity overcoming impure lust)

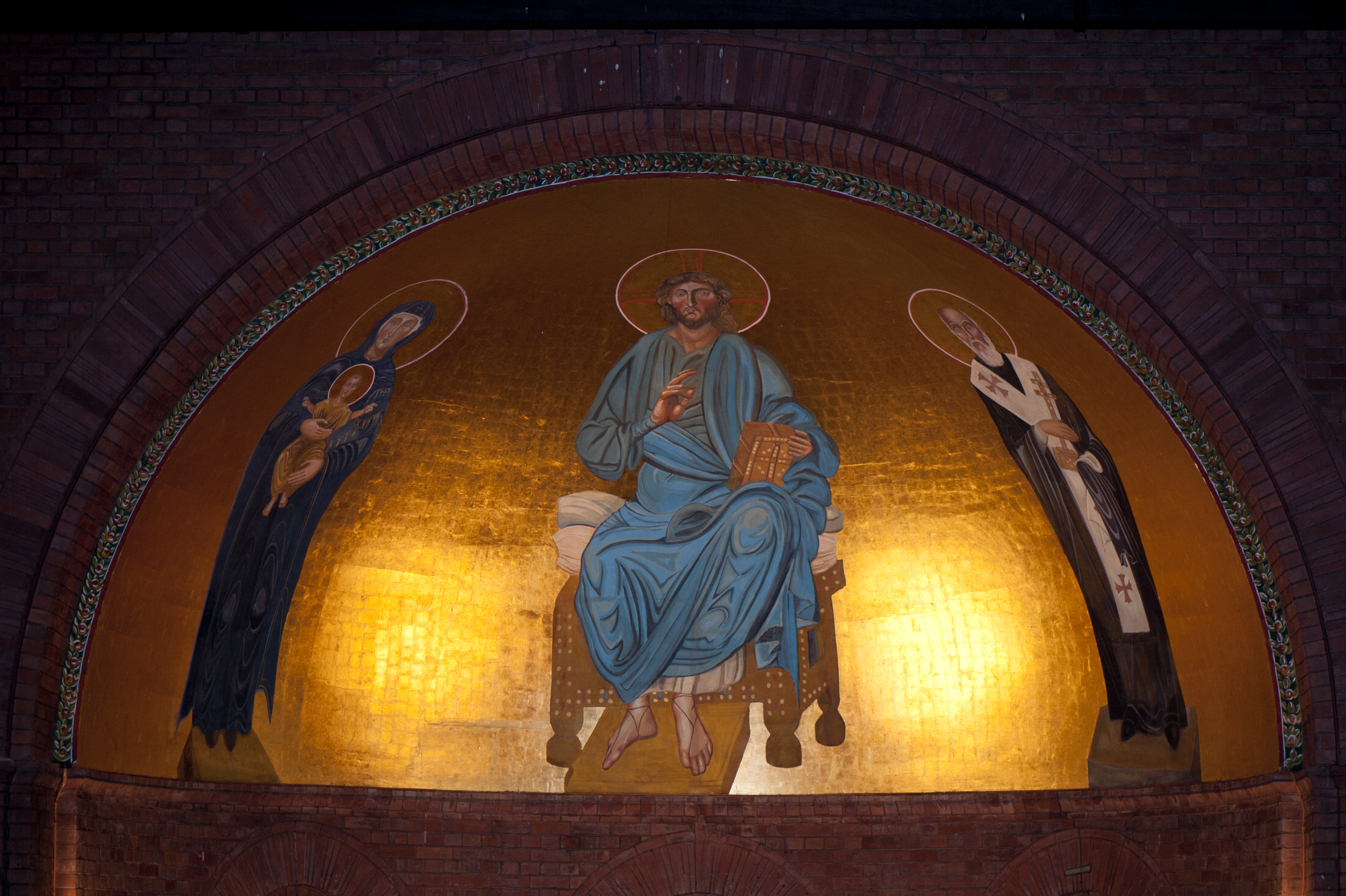
Apse painting at St Augustine's Church, Swindon, of Christ Pantocrator with the virgin and child and St Augustine

Other artwork in the church includes the apse painting, two icons and two triptychs designed and painted by Fleur Kelly in the late 1980s and 1990s. The painting in the semi-dome of the apse depicts Christ Pantocrator, flanked by Mary and Child and an elderly St Augustine, on a gold background; Julian Orbach writes that the apse is "much enhanced" by the work. The icons to the sides of the apse are of Pope Gregory the Great and King Ethelbert of Kent. The triptychs are of the Virgin Mary and Child, and St Augustine holding a model of the current church.

There are six stained glass windows: three in the apse and the ocular window high in the nave above the apse arch date from the earlier years of the church. Two other windows on the south side are from the 1950s. The south window of St Peter is by Basil Barber, an apprentice of Sir Ninian Comper.

== Parish ==
A district (parish) was created for the new church in 1930, from parts of the parishes of Rodbourne Cheney and Swindon New Town (the latter being the parish of St Mark's, the first church for the railway town, consecrated in 1845).

From 2004 until 2018, St Augustine's was joined in a united benefice with All Saints, Ferndale and St Barnabas, Gorse Hill. Since late 2018, St Augustine's is a separate parish.

== Music ==
The church has a strong musical tradition, the choir of the early days having nearly 50 men and boys. Women were allowed into the choir for the first time in the mid-1970s.

Sir John Betjeman was said to be a regular visitor to choral evensong and once hosted the choir at his Wantage estate for a summer choir camp. The choir has previously sung in cathedrals and major churches including St Paul's, Westminster Abbey and St Mary Redcliffe and was well known in the locality for its size and quality.

The church has had two organs. The pipe organ of two manuals and 12 stops (896 pipes), built by Hele of Plymouth, was decommissioned in 2003, and most of the pipework and action has been removed except for the large Open Diapason display pipes, some pedal pipes and the bottom 12 notes of the Dulciana stop which are now displayed on the church floor. The current organ is a two-manual digital organ of 33 speaking stops, donated to the church in 2003. The loudspeakers are positioned high up in the organ loft, about 30 feet (9.1 m) above the north stalls of the choir.

== Events ==
In 2018, a display of 1,300 poppies commemorated the 100th anniversary of the Armistice and the end of World War One. The poppies were made by pupils of Even Swindon Primary School and church members, and hung on thin lines so that they appeared to float above the congregation and visitor alike. Other displays included a cascade of knitted poppies over the font and from the high altar, "There but Not There" silhouettes, and information on the local men who never came home. Photos of the displays were included in most UK national newspapers and the church was used by BBC Points West for a live broadcast of their evening news programme on 9 November 2018, the Friday before Remembrance Sunday. The programme was anchored by Alex Lovell.
