= Lydiard Tregoze =

Village and civil parish in Wiltshire, England

Coordinates: 51.561°N 1.850°W

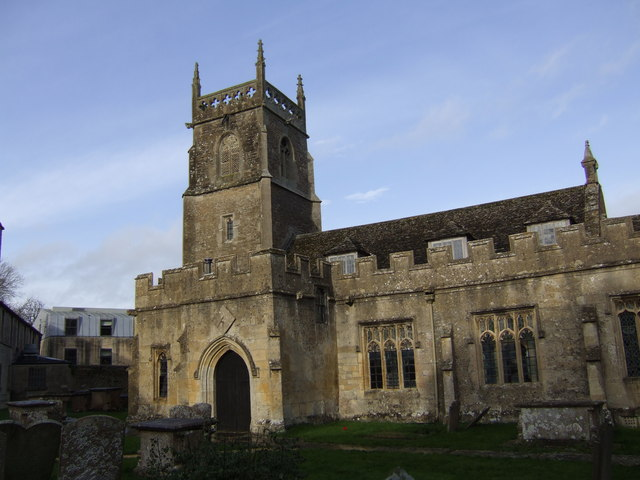
- St Mary's, Lydiard Tregoze

- Location within Wiltshire
- Population: 531 (2021)
- OS grid reference: SU105847
- Civil parish: Lydiard Tregoze
- Unitary authority: Wiltshire
- Ceremonial county: Wiltshire
- Region: South West
- Country: England
- Sovereign state: United Kingdom
- Post town: Swindon
- Postcode district: SN4, SN5
- Dialling code: 01793
- Police: Wiltshire
- Fire: Dorset and Wiltshire
- Ambulance: South Western
- UK Parliament: Chippenham
- Website: Parish Council

Lydiard Tregoze is a small village and civil parish on the western edge of Swindon in the county of Wiltshire, in the south-west of England. Its name has in the past been spelt as Liddiard Tregooze.

The parish includes the small village of Hook, and the hamlets of Hook Street and Ballard's Ash.

== History ==
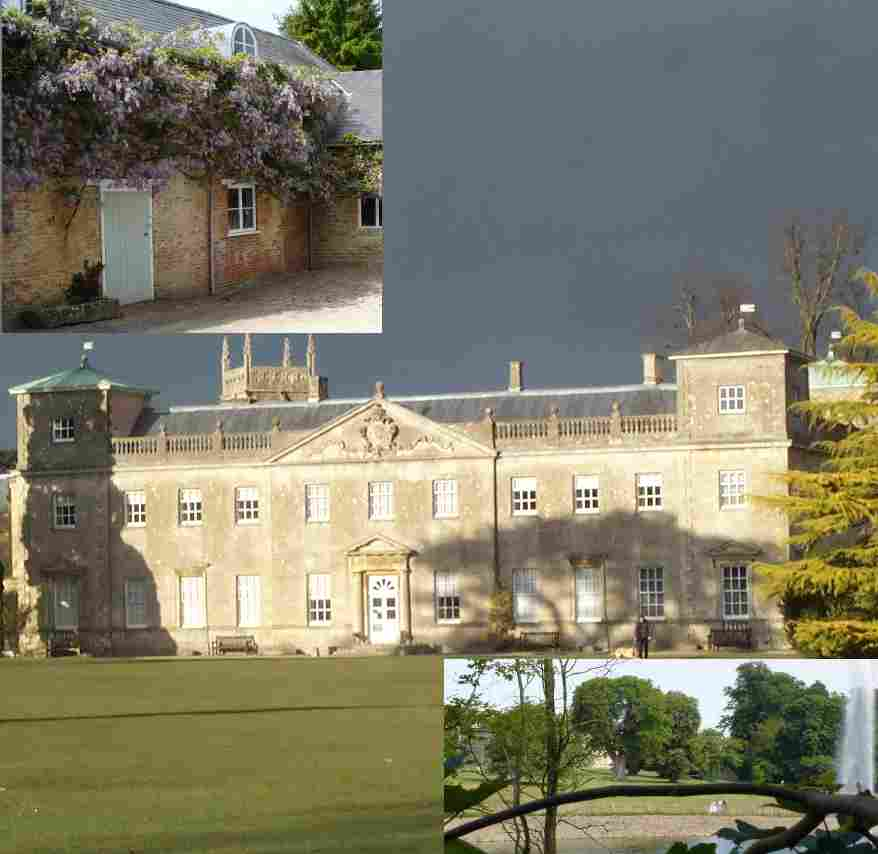
Lydiard House

Lydiard Tregoze is mentioned in Domesday Book as a manor belonging to Alfred of Marlborough, Baron of Ewyas, a powerful Saxon nobleman who retains his lands after the Conquest, and a Tenant-in-Chief to King William I of England. Near Royal Wootton Bassett, the parish of Lydiard Tregoze was part of the Kingsbridge Hundred, while its village originally centred on the medieval parish church of St Mary and the nearby manor house, Lydiard House, which came to be the home of the St John family, Viscounts Bolingbroke. However, the original village of Lydiard Tregoze disappeared, giving way to the grounds of an important country house, although St Mary's church survives and contains important monuments.

Margaret Beaufort, mother of Henry VII, was the stepdaughter of Oliver St John of Lydiard Tregoze. His marriage to her mother, Margaret Beauchamp of Bletso, produced six children to whom she remained close throughout her life, and this gave the St Johns considerable influence at Court in the early decades of the Tudor dynasty.

In 1615, Lucy St John, daughter of Sir John St John of Lydiard Tregoze, married Sir Allen Apsley, one of the founders of the New England Company. Anne St John of Lydiard, the daughter of Sir John St John, 1st Baronet, was married on 2 October 1632 to Sir Francis Henry Lee, 2nd Baronet of Ditchley, son of Sir Henry Lee, 1st Baronet and Eleanor Wharton. Anne was married a second time in 1644 to Henry Wilmot, 1st Earl of Rochester, a leading Royalist during the English Civil War, son of Charles Wilmot, 1st Viscount Wilmot and Sarah Anderson. Anne St John was the mother of John Wilmot, 2nd Earl of Rochester and grandmother of Edward Lee, 1st Earl of Lichfield.

In 1801, the population of the parish was 578, in 1901 it was 618, and in 1971 549.

John Bartholomew's Gazetteer of the British Isles (1887) describes Lydiard Tregoze as: "Liddiard Tregooze, par. and vil., Wilts, 1 mile SE. of Liddiard Millicent, 5142 ac., pop. 660."

Lydiard Tregoze has been suggested as a location for the 9th century Battle of Ellandun.

There was a one-room school, supported by Lord Bolingbroke, from the early 1800s. A new school was opened in 1866 near Hook Street, aided by National Society funding; this had two classrooms and a master's house. An average of 90 pupils attended in 1899, but numbers fell and there were only 30 in 1930. The school closed in 1965 and its 23 pupils transferred to Lydiard Millicent. The building was later extended and is now a small hotel and restaurant.

Originally, the parish boundary in the north-east followed the Cheltenham railway. In 1981 an eastern portion of the parish – including Toot Hill and the hamlet of Mannington – was transferred to Thamesdown borough (later the Borough of Swindon). Most of this area has been developed for housing as the Swindon suburbs of Windmill Hill, Freshbrook, Toothill and Mannington, and it forms part of West Swindon parish, created in 2017.

=== Midgehall ===
The manor and tithing of Midgehall was south of Hook. It was granted to Stanley Abbey in the 1150s, and in 1534 leased by William Pleydell. Later members of the Pleydell family sat in Parliament for Wootton Bassett: William's son, William Pleydell (fl.1640); another son, John Pleydell (c.1601–1693); and Edmund Pleydell (c.1652–1726). The Pleydells left Midgehall after Edmund's death. The 18th-century farmhouse survives; the manor house was to its north, and the moat around the former manor house was filled in during the construction of the M4 motorway.

== Parish church ==
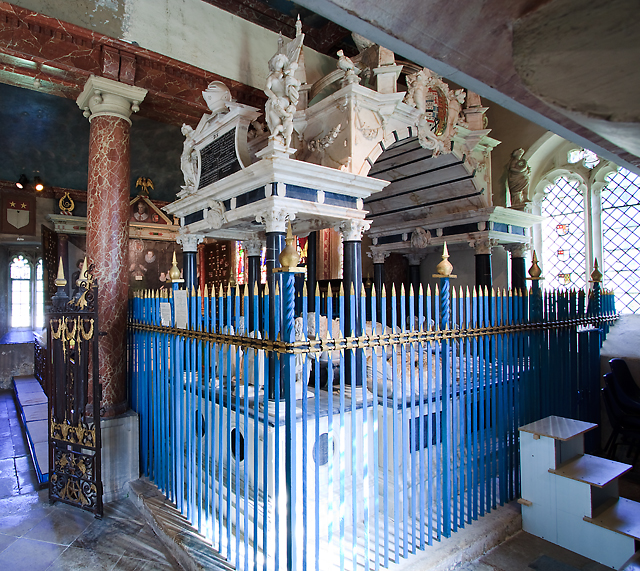
Monument to Sir John St John in the church

A church at Lydiard Tregoze was mentioned in 1100. The present St Mary's parish church – sometimes called St Mary's in the Park – stands next to Lydiard House and is built in limestone rubble with some ashlar. The nave and north aisle are from the 13th century, while the chancel, south aisle with porch, and tower are of the 15th. A painted triptych was begun in 1615, its outer panels showing the St John family tree; the south chancel chapel was rebuilt for the family in 1633. The plastered nave walls carry paintings, some from the 13th century. Windows have reset medieval glass, and the west window of 1859 is by Alexander Gibbs. A canopied monument to Sir John St John and his wives, c. 1635, is within railings.

The tower has six bells, three of them cast by Roger I Purdue in 1635. The building was designated as Grade I listed in 1955. Nikolaus Pevsner wrote "Not a big church, but cram-full of enjoyable furnishings, richer than any other of similar size in the country".

The benefice was united with Lydiard Millicent in 1956; the incumbent lived at Lydiard Millicent. The two parishes were united in 1981 and following the 1989 building of a church in the Swindon suburb of Shaw, the parish was renamed West Swindon and the Lydiards in 1996. A reorganisation effective in 2018 saw the separation of Lydiard Millicent parish, and today the church is part of the West Swindon and Lydiard Tregoze Church Partnership. Parish registers survive from 1666 and are kept in the Wiltshire and Swindon Archives.

The medieval wall paintings were included in the Church of England's "100 Church Treasures" campaign, an appeal launched in 2013 which addresses the 100 artworks most in need of conservation. Beginning in 2016, the Lydiard Park Heritage Trust was awarded grants from the Heritage Lottery Fund towards a £1m project to restore and improve the interior of the church.

== Lydiard Park and Lydiard House ==
Lydiard Park was the home of the St John family from 1420 until 1940. In 1943, the local authority, the Corporation of Swindon, bought the then dilapidated house and its overgrown park from the estate trustees.

The estate now belongs to Swindon Borough Council, the successor of the Corporation. The parkland is operated as a country park and entertainment venue; the house is open to the public in the summer and now has a significant art collection, including fine-painted panels by Lady Diana Beauclerk.

== Notable people ==
See Viscount Bolingbroke for notable members of the St John family.

Giles Mompesson (1583/1584 – 1663), a politician who was sentenced for corruption, erected a monument in the church following the death of his wife Katherine in 1633.

== Transport ==
The Wilts & Berks Canal (1810–1914) crossed the parish. The Great Western Main Line railway follows a similar route; there are no local stations, the nearest being Swindon. Between 1840 and 1841, as the railway was being built in stages from London, a temporary terminus known as Wootton Bassett Road was at Hay Lane.

The M4 motorway also crosses the parish, and its junction 16 provides routes to West Swindon, Royal Wootton Bassett and Wroughton.
