= Rodbourne =

Suburb of Swindon, Wiltshire, United Kingdom

Coordinates: 51°33′52″N 1°48′10″W

- Percy Street in 2008

- Location within Wiltshire
- Civil parish: Central Swindon North
- Unitary authority: Borough of Swindon
- Ceremonial county: Wiltshire
- Region: South West
- Country: England
- Sovereign state: United Kingdom
- Post town: SWINDON
- Postcode district: SN2
- Dialling code: 01793
- Police: Wiltshire
- Fire: Dorset and Wiltshire
- Ambulance: South Western
- UK Parliament: Swindon South

Rodbourne is an inner suburb of Swindon, Wiltshire, England, about 1 mile (1.6 km) northwest of the town centre. The area comprises primarily of Victorian terraced housing and is closely tied to the former Swindon Railway Works, which have since been transformed into the Swindon Designer Outlet. It has also historically – and more rarely in present-day usage – been called Even Swindon.

== Etymology ==
The name 'Rodbourne' means "reedy stream" or "reedy brook". The Old English form is hrēod-burna, reappearing in the name of Nova Hreod Academy, a secondary school in north Swindon.

== History ==
Rodbourne evolved from the former hamlet of Even Swindon, which originally was a tithing of Rodbourne Cheney parish. The hamlet contained the Anglican church of St Mary, which has 13th-century origins but was rebuilt in 1848. Although the name of Even Swindon still appears on some maps, by the early 21st century it was considered to be part of Rodbourne.

The area began to be built-up in the 1870s as housing requirements for workers of the nearby railway works grew. In 1890, Rodbourne was transferred to the municipal borough of Swindon.

As the population grew, in the 1880s a mission chapel (dependent on St Mary's) was established near the railway works, leading to the building of St Augustine's church at Summers Street, completed in 1908.

Land to the north of the Wilts and Berks Canal and the Golden Valley Line was also part of Rodbourne Cheney civil parish until 1928 when the parish was dissolved and the area transferred to Swindon municipal borough.

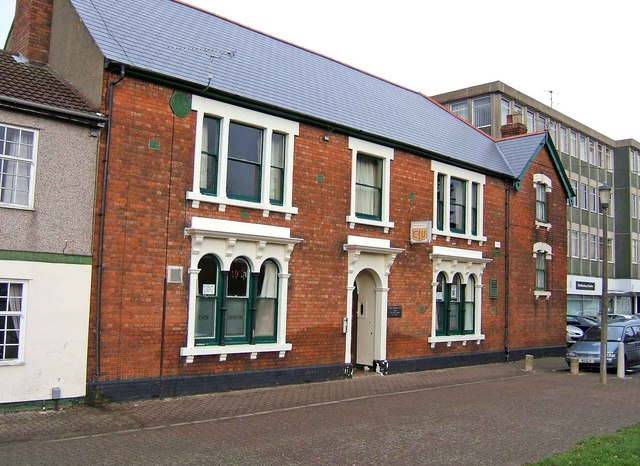
Even Swindon Club

== Amenities ==
Rodbourne has a primary school, Even Swindon Primary School, established in 1880. Originally on Hughes Street, the school moved to a newer, modern building in 2007. The old school building subsequently fell derelict before it was damaged by a fire in February 2013, and demolished the following December. An Aldi supermarket opened on the site in 2018.

== Governance ==
Rodbourne lies within the Central Swindon North civil parish. For elections to Swindon Borough Council, it is part of the Rodbourne Ferndale and Western ward, which elects three councillors. For general elections, it is part of the Swindon South constituency.
