= Wichelstowe =

Area of Swindon, England

Coordinates: 51°32′36″N 1°48′27″W

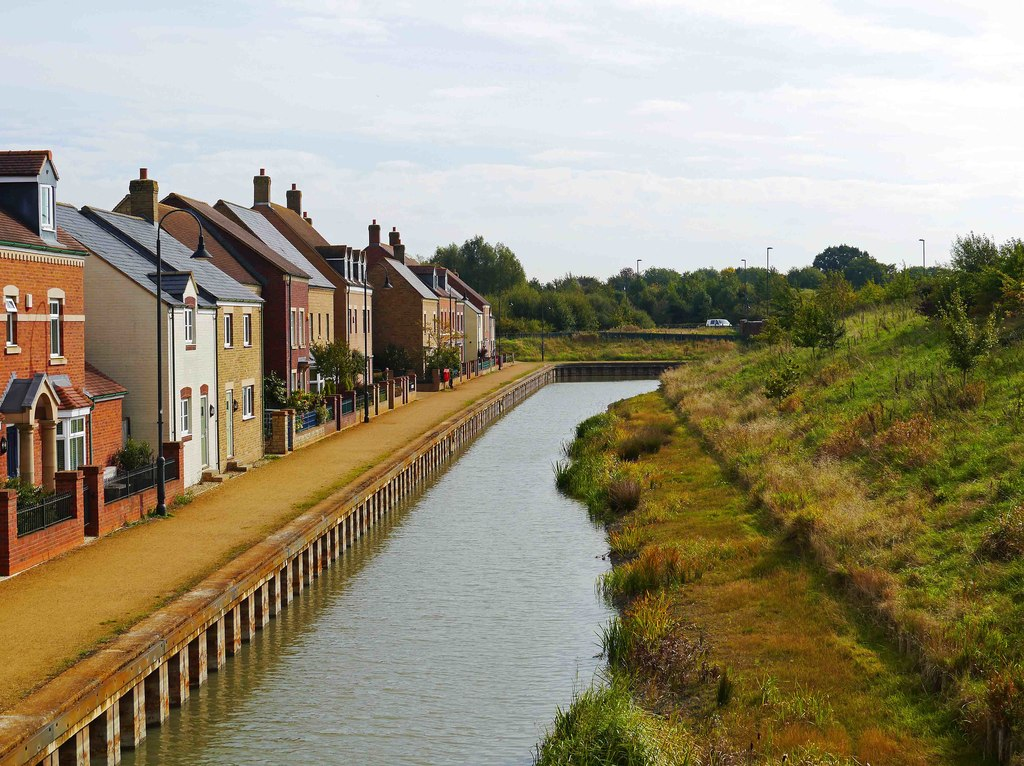
- Wilts and Berks Canal in East Wichel
- Unitary authority: Borough of Swindon
- Ceremonial county: Wiltshire
- Region: South West
- Country: England
- Sovereign state: United Kingdom
- Post town: SWINDON
- Postcode district: SN
- Dialling code: 01793
- Police: Wiltshire
- Fire: Dorset and Wiltshire
- Ambulance: South Western
- UK Parliament: South Swindon (East Wichel); East Wiltshire (Middle & West Wichel)
- Website: www.wichelstowe.co.uk

Wichelstowe is a suburb of Swindon, Wiltshire, England, approximately 3 kilometres (1.9 mi) south of the town centre. Situated between the M4 motorway and Old Town Railway Path, Wichelstowe has three neighbourhoods: East, Middle and West Wichel.

Development of Middle and West Wichel is ongoing. Once fully completed, the area will comprise up to 4,500 homes, employment space, public open space, shopping, community facilities for residents and various schools.

The partially restored Wilts and Berks Canal runs through Middle Wichel, and new stretches of canal have been built as far as East Wichel; these are intended to provide a new route for the canal, its original route through the centre of Swindon having been built over. Nearby areas include Okus and Old Town to the north, Croft to the east, Wroughton to the south, and Toothill and Freshbrook to the west.

== History ==
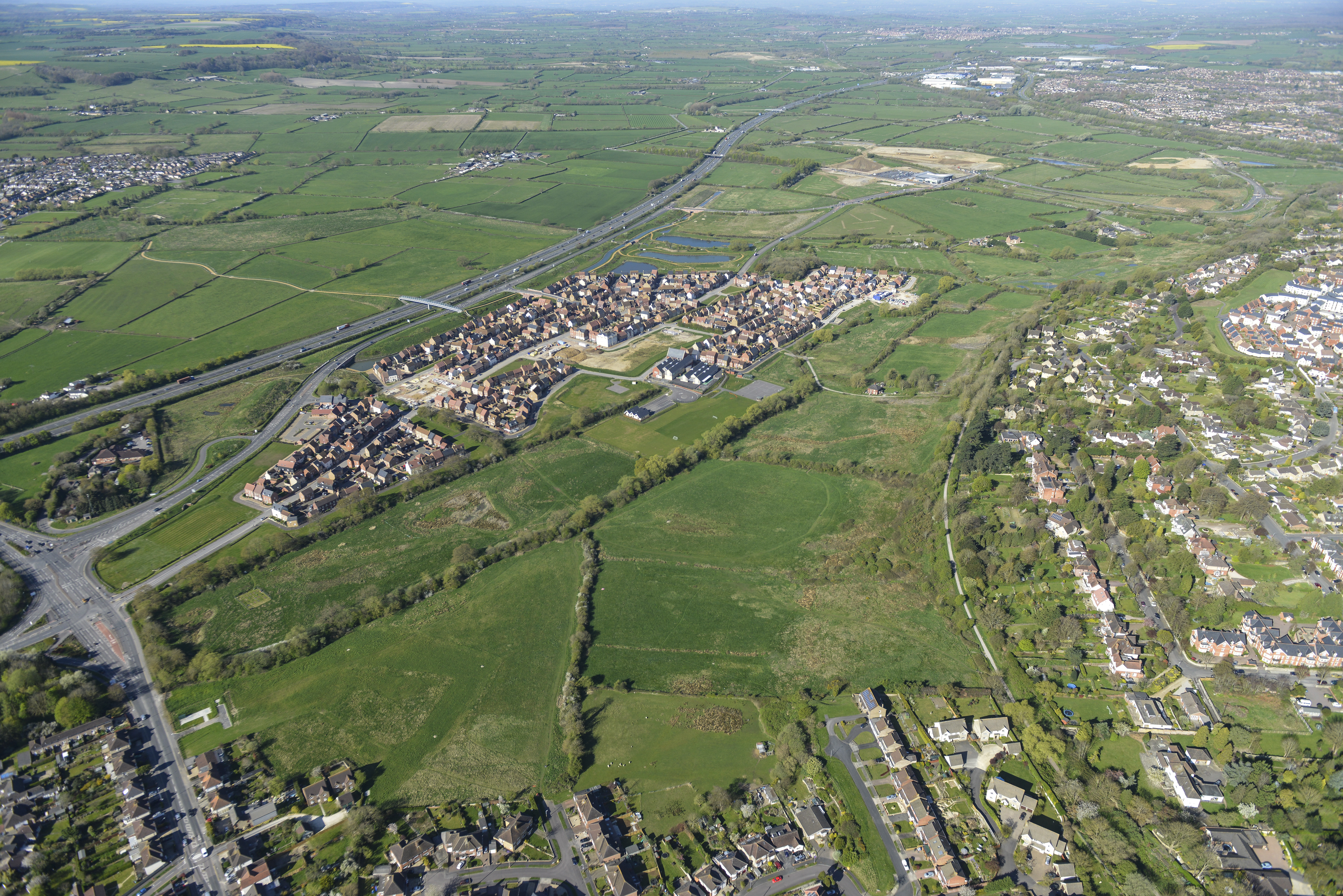
Aerial view of East Wichel, 2014

The medieval history of the site is reflected in the name; 'Wichel' is the original name of the area as recorded in the Domesday Book of 1086, and 'stowe' is an Old English word meaning "meeting place".

Before Wichelstowe was developed, the area was known as the 'front garden' of Swindon since it was a stretch of open land which separated the main urban area from the motorway.

In 1995, the first proposals for the site were put forward for consideration by Wiltshire County Council as structure planning authority. The following year, the first public proposal for the site considered a comprehensive development to help meet Swindon's housing needs up to 2011. 3,800 houses were initially proposed for the site, but planners increased this figure to 4,500 in April 2004.

In 2001, the Front Garden Action Group (FRAG) launched an unsuccessful High Court challenge against the plans for housebuilding, and the green light was effectively given for Wichelstowe to go ahead. An extensive programme of public consultation was undertaken on the proposals by Taylor Woodrow. An outline planning application was submitted in 2002, and received approval in August 2005.

Construction of Wichelstowe began with a "shovels in the ground" moment on 25 May 2006, and the name of 'Wichelstowe' was announced at the same time. The development began as a collaboration between Swindon Borough Council and Taylor Wimpey to jointly provide and finance infrastructure. In early 2009, this agreement was reshaped into a co-operation agreement; both parties operated independently but in a mutually supportive way to develop the site. The entire development was originally planned for completion by the early 2020s, but this was heavily delayed by the 2008 financial crisis.

Road infrastructure from Croft Road to Wootton Bassett Road avoiding Old Town, including a new bridge over the Wilts and Berks Canal, was built between 2007 and 2010, and opened as a throughfare in December 2011.

After a period of infrastructure works, work on housing commenced in 2008. Thamesdown Transport (now Swindon's Bus Company) amended bus service 11 to serve East Wichel in May 2008, giving the development its first bus link. The first school in Wichelstowe, East Wichel Community Primary School, opened to pupils in September 2011, and the first new section of canal was completed the same year. A Waitrose supermarket opened in April 2014, becoming the first feature of the district centre.

A relief road was originally planned to run parallel to the M4 motorway for the entire length of the development before passing underneath, and a 'ghost junction' was built at the end of Blackhorse Way in anticipation of work continuing, but the proposed road was scrapped when Wichelstowe's road layout plans were changed in the mid-2010s.

Mill Lane, a relatively narrow country lane which ran through Middle Wichel prior to development, was closed to through traffic in 2021 to combat rat running between Old Town and Wichelstowe. The southernmost section of Mill Lane was remodelled and is incorporated into the modern road network, while the northern section is now primarily used by pedestrians and cyclists.

The Deanery Academy opened to pupils in September 2019, creating secondary school provision for Wichelstowe, and a second primary school, The Kingfisher Academy, followed in September 2021.

== Neighbourhoods ==
=== East Wichel ===
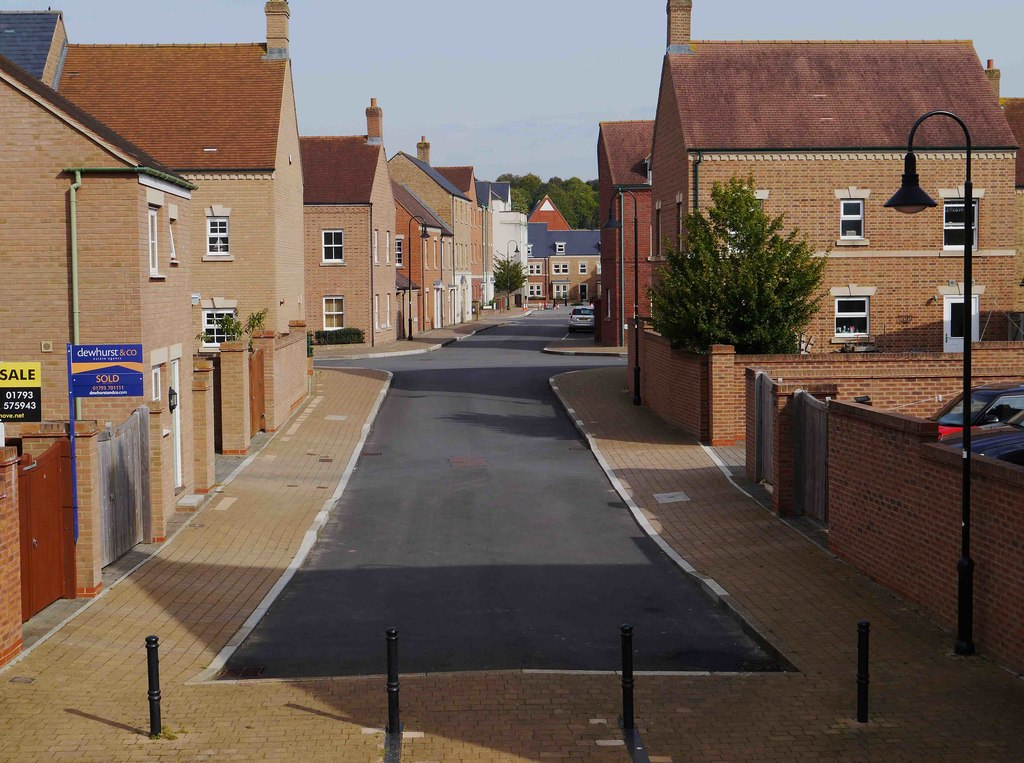
Rylane in East Wichel, 2017

East Wichel, the eastern quarter, was largely built by Taylor Wimpey who operated independently with support from Swindon Borough Council. Construction started in 2008, and the development was completed by 2014.

The area consists of predominately housing, much of it built in a pseudo-Victorian style. A local centre hosts amenities including a Co-op store, a fish and chip shop, a dentist, cafes and a hair salon. A Marston's pub/restaurant, The Wichel Inn, is located in the south-eastern corner of the quarter. It originally opened as The Bayberry in May 2012 before rebranding in November 2021.

A newly built strip of the Wilts and Berks Canal skirts along the southern fringe of the area, completed in 2011. It is the first part of the proposed new section of the canal which breaks off from its original route in West Wichel, running along the south and eastern edges of Swindon before rejoining the historic route near Shrivenham.

=== Middle Wichel ===
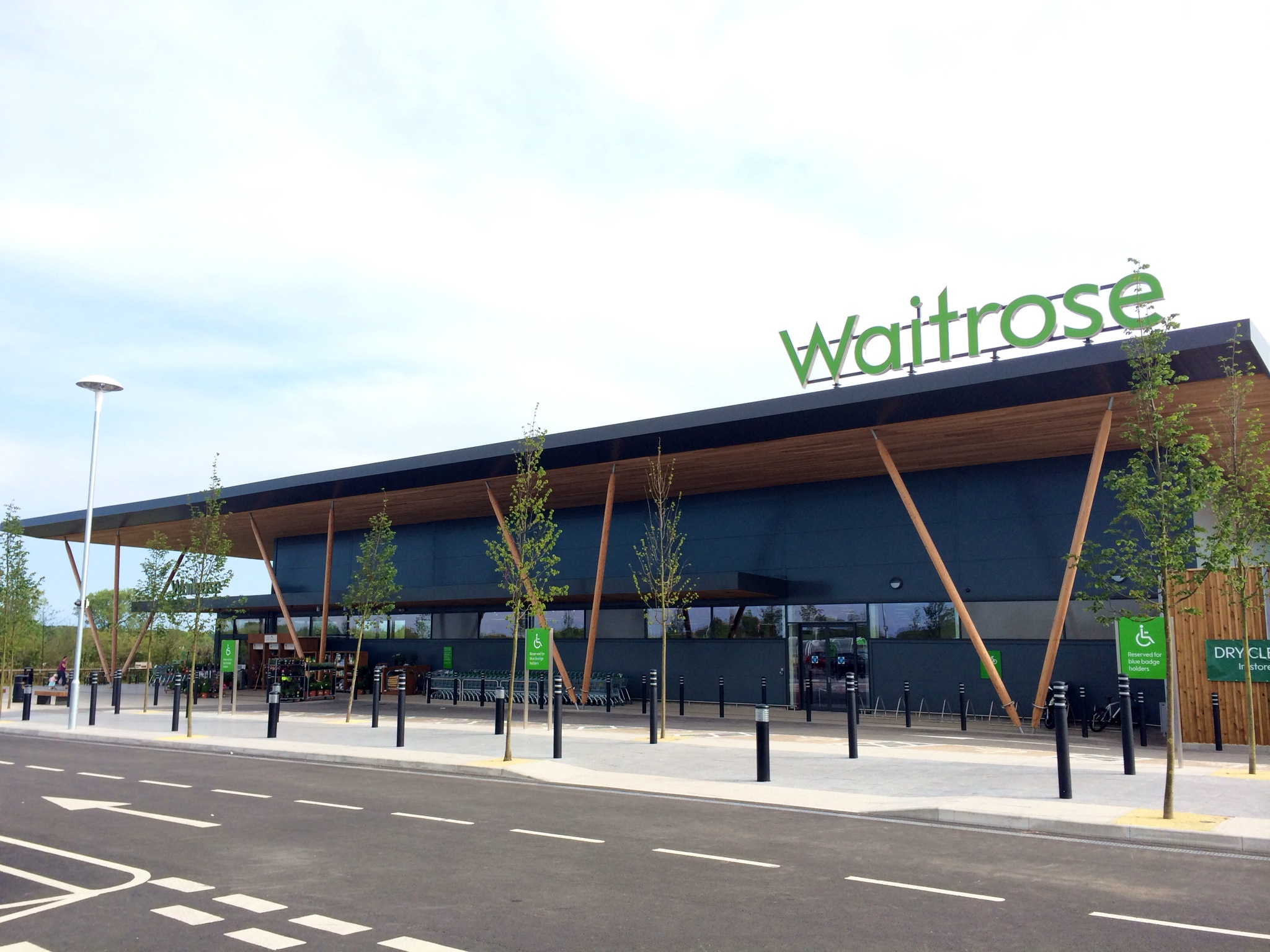
Waitrose in Middle Wichel, 2014

Middle Wichel is the central part of Wichelstowe, consisting of The Deanery Academy, Kingfisher Primary Academy, and amenities such as a Waitrose supermarket and a Hall & Woodhouse pub. The Wilts and Berks Canal serves as the area's centrepiece.

The area was established in April 2014 with the opening of Waitrose. Housing in Middle Wichel bears a generally more modern design than its eastern counterpart; some is sited along the Wilts and Berks Canal. A canal junction is currently under construction in the south of the area, which aims to join the East Wichel and Kingshill–Middle Wichel sections.

A small wooded area, Wichel Wood, is to the east of Mill Lane. A GP surgery and other amenities are proposed for the district centre.

Middle and West Wichel are divided by a green corridor, featuring a children's playground and a boardwalk connecting the two areas which opened in July 2025.

=== West Wichel ===
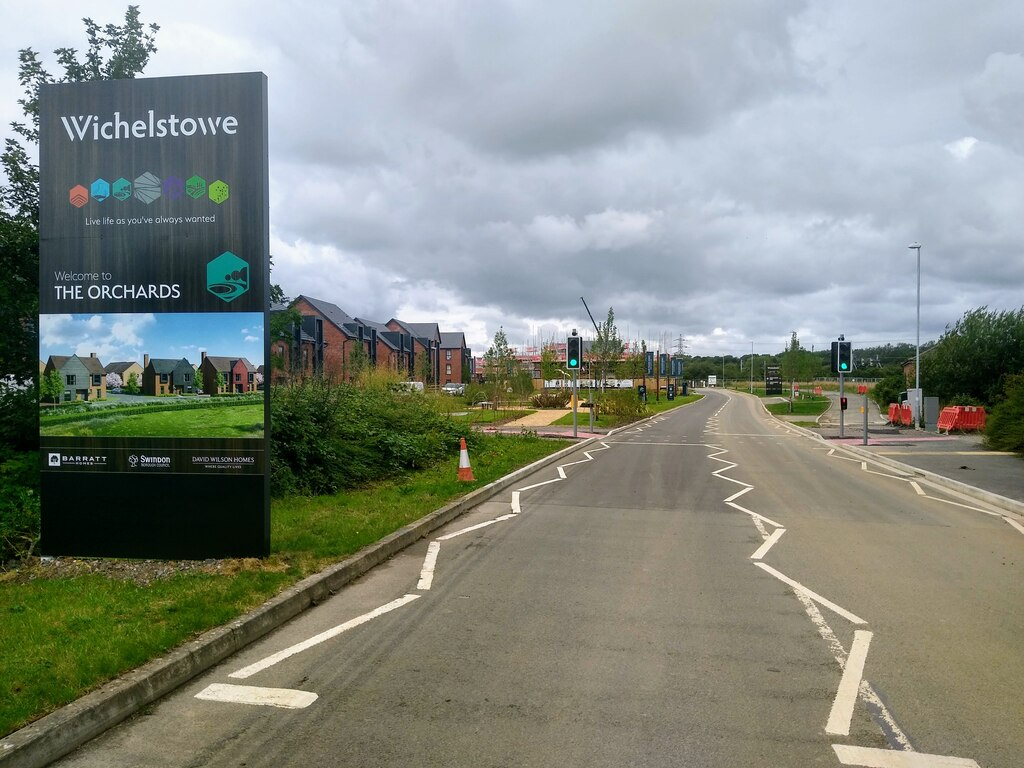
Scott Way in West Wichel, 2023

West Wichel, the western quarter, is the most recent section of Wichelstowe and construction is ongoing. The area is planned to be primarily residential in its north and more commercial-based in its south. A local centre, primary school, and park and ride are also planned. Construction began in 2022.

Wichel Way, dubbed the 'Wichelstowe Southern Access Road' (WSAR) in development, was built from 2020 to 2022 at a cost of £25 million. The road, which cuts under the M4 motorway via a tunnel, was built to provide a direct link from Wichelstowe to Wharf Road, M4 Junction 16 and Royal Wootton Bassett. However, the WSAR has remained closed since its completion due to the extension of Scott Way, the rest of the link, being built at a later date. The Scott Way extension was built in 2024–2025 and has now been completed; a planned opening date for the link of 'before summer 2026' has been given.

== Education ==
Wichelstowe has a secondary school, The Deanery Academy in Middle Wichel, which provides for students aged 11–16. An originally-proposed sixth form at the site has not yet come to fruition. East and Middle Wichel have a primary school each: East Wichel Community Primary School and The Kingfisher Academy respectively. A third primary school is proposed for West Wichel.

== Transport ==
East and Middle Wichel are served by bus routes 9 and 11 operated by Swindon's Bus Company. Links to Wroughton, Old Town, Swindon town centre, and north Swindon are variously covered across the two routes. East Wichel Way, which runs east-west through East Wichel, has bus-only stretches which prevent other traffic using it as a route through the residential area. West Wichel does not yet have a bus service as of 2026. Stagecoach West formerly operated bus services in Wichelstowe: route 73 from 2011 to 2012, and route 9 from 2016 to 2026.

Wichelstowe is provided with cycle infrastructure; the Southern Flyer cycle route runs between Middle Wichel and Wharf Green.

== Government ==
East Wichel is part of South Swindon civil parish, while Middle and West Wichel are part of Wroughton and Wichelstowe civil parish. The first tier of local government is the respective parish councils. The local authority is Swindon Borough Council, a unitary authority. West and Middle Wichel form part of the council's Wroughton and Wichelstowe ward, while East Wichel is within Old Town ward; each ward elects three members of the council.

For national elections, Wichelstowe straddles two constituencies; East Wichel lies within the Swindon South constituency, while Middle and West Wichel are in the East Wiltshire constituency.
