= Lydiard Park =

Public space and historic house in Swindon, England

Coordinates: 51°33′38″N 01°51′06″W

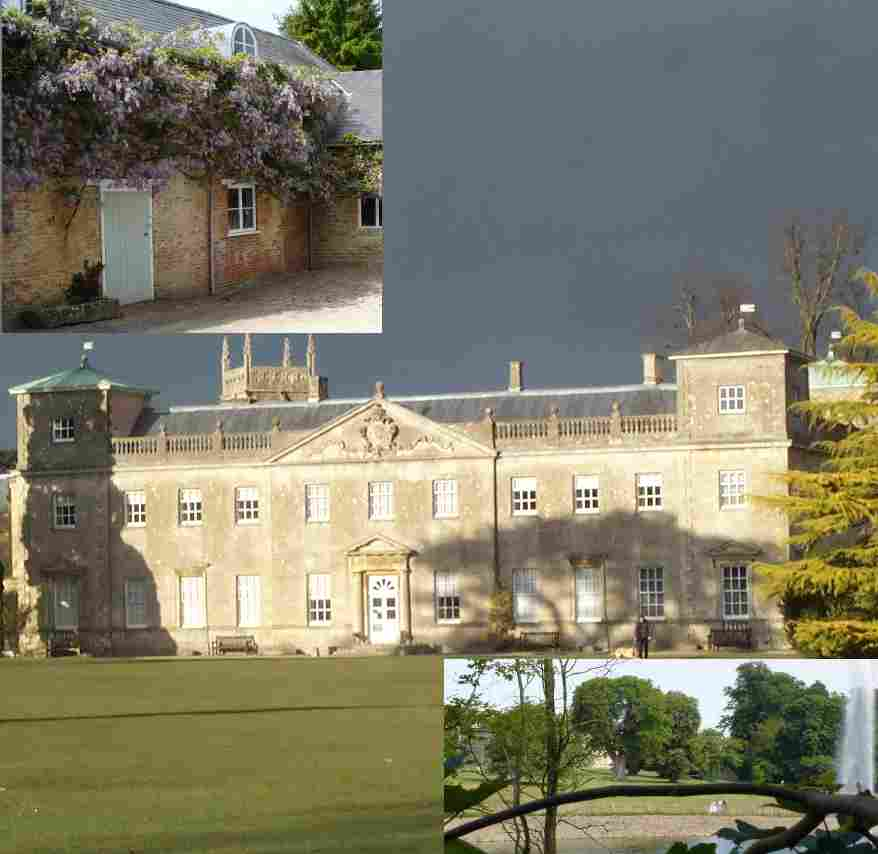
Lydiard Park collage

Lydiard Park is a 260-acre (110-hectare) country park at Lydiard Tregoze, which was its former name, about 3 miles (5 km) west of central Swindon, Wiltshire, England, in West Swindon parish, near Junction 16 of the M4 motorway.

The park, which is included on the Historic England Register of Historic Parks and Gardens at Grade II, surrounds the Grade I listed Lydiard House, a mansion built in the 17th and 18th centuries.

== History ==
A settlement at Lediar, with woodland, is mentioned in the Domesday Book of 1086, and was owned by the Tregoze family from about 1198. In 1259, Henry III gave Robert Tregoze a royal licence to create a deer park in nearby woodland. In 1420 the estate came by marriage to the St John family (whose seat was at Battersea, London), and they owned it until the Second World War.

Formal gardens and a canal were created as part of changes made to the medieval house in the 17th century; Sir John St John also laid out a series of formal avenues. However, many of the formal elements of the park had been removed by 1766. Surviving features from the 18th century include a semi-underground listed ice house and a walled garden, with a bronze sundial at its centre. Large parts of the park were sold off in the 1920s and 1930s.

From 1942 the park was used as a military hospital by the American Forces, and then between about 1943 and about March 1946 it was a Prisoner of War hospital for German soldiers as POW camp No.160. In 1943, Councillor and Alderman Francis Akers bought the estate and the dilapidated house at auction and sold the whole to the local authority, the Corporation of Swindon, for £4,500.

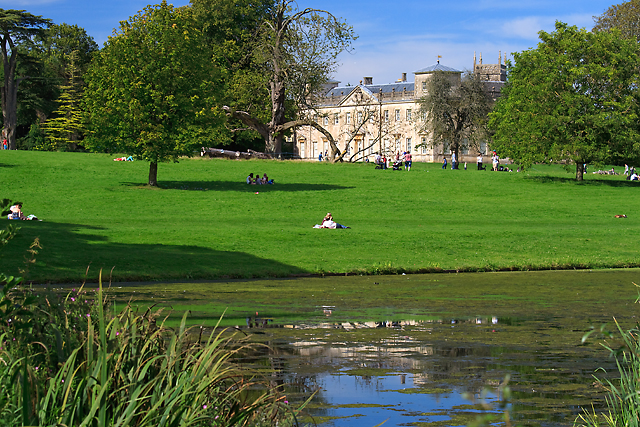
Part of lake and park, with house and church tower in the background

Since 1955, the park has been open to the public all year round. The park was designated Grade II on the Register of Historic Parks and Gardens in 1987, as an example of a mid-18th century park having archaeological evidence of its 17th-century formal layout. The walls of the walled garden are Grade II listed as is the sundial within it.

In 2005, Swindon Borough Council received £3m from the Heritage Lottery Fund towards a restoration project which included reinstating a two-acre lake. The park hosted Radio 1's Big Weekend in 2009.

In 2017, the park was transferred from Lydiard Tregoze parish to the newly created West Swindon parish.

As a result of the 2022 heatwaves, traces of formal gardens thought to date from the 17th century became visible from the air.

== Lydiard House ==
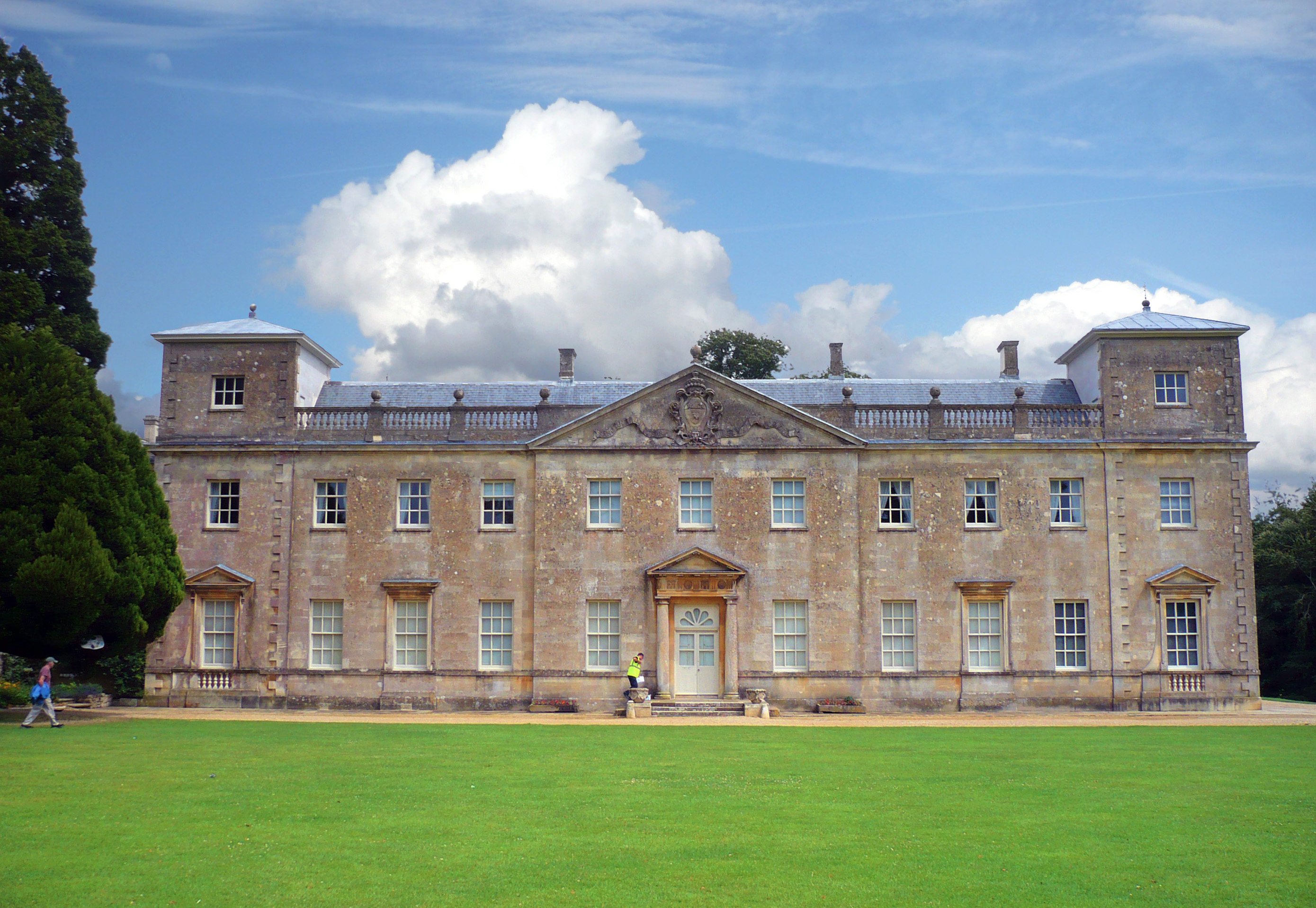
Lydiard House from the southwest

The manor house, known as Lydiard House or Lydiard Park, has medieval origins and was remodelled in the 17th century and the 1740s, when the south and east fronts were reworked in Palladian style, probably by Roger Morris. The house was designated as Grade I listed in 1955.

When the estate was bought by Swindon Corporation, almost none of the original furnishings remained. In the 1950s, the corporation began to collect suitable contents for the house, aiming in particular to restore the 18th century State Rooms. These efforts were much helped in 1955 when some good furniture arrived on loan from the National Art Collections Fund, part of the E. E. Cook bequest. During the 1960s Lord Bolingbroke loaned several St John family portraits to the house and later sold them to the corporation. When he died in 1974, he bequeathed to the trustees of the house everything he owned which had come from it.

The art collection at Lydiard House includes landscapes and busts as well as portraits spanning over 300 years. The portraits include works by William Aikman, Michael Dahl, John Greenhill, Cornelius Johnson, Godfrey Kneller, Sir Peter Lely, Jonathan Richardson and Maria Verelst.

The corporation's successor, Swindon Borough Council, owns and manages the house and park. The house, with its collections of furniture and art – including painted wall panels by Lady Diana Beauclerk – is open to the public in the summer months. The house and a modern annex are operated as a conference centre and wedding venue, with accommodation for guests.

Immediately north of the house stands the parish church of St Mary, which is all that remains of the medieval village. The church has 13th-century origins and was refurbished and enlarged in the 15th and 17th centuries; it is Grade I listed.

== In fiction ==
The dereliction of the hall and the declining fortunes of the St John family formed the backdrop of the 1967 novel The Heir of Starvelings by American writer Evelyn Berckman.
