= Fir Clump Stone Circle =

Neolithic stone circle in Wiltshire, England

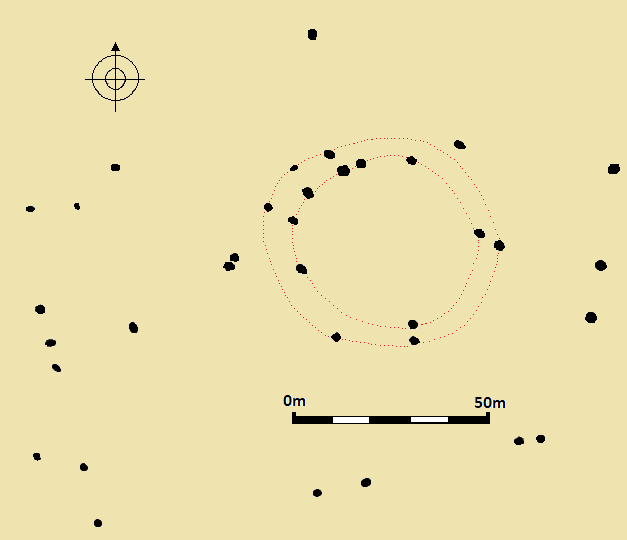
- Diagram of Fir Clump Stone Circle, based on Richard Reiss's 1965 measurements. The black marks represent stones recorded in the vicinity; the red lines demarcate the concentric rings of the putative circle.

- Location within Wiltshire
- 51°31′57″N 01°45′59″W
- Type: Stone circle
- Periods: Neolithic / Bronze Age
- Location: Near Wroughton

Fir Clump Stone Circle was a stone circle in Burderop Wood near Wroughton, Wiltshire, in South West England. The ring was part of a tradition of stone circle construction that spread throughout much of Britain, Ireland, and Brittany during the Late Neolithic and Early Bronze Age, over a period between 3300 and 900 BCE. The purpose of such monuments is unknown, although some archaeologists speculate that the stones represented supernatural entities for the circle's builders.

A double concentric circle consisting of sarsen megaliths, the Fir Clump stone circle was oval-shaped. The outer ring measured 107 metres (351 ft) by 86.5 metres (284 ft) in diameter, and the inner ring 86.5 metres (284 ft) by 73.7 metres (242 ft). It was one of at least seven stone circles that are known to have been erected in the area south of Swindon in northern Wiltshire. Around the 1860s, the megaliths of Fir Clump stone circle were levelled. In the 1890s, the antiquarian A. D. Passmore observed that the circle was no longer visible. Some of the fallen megaliths were rediscovered in 1965 by the archaeologist Richard Reiss, who described and measured the monument. In 1969, these stones were removed during construction of the M4 motorway.

== Context ==
While the transition from the Early Neolithic to the Late Neolithic in the fourth and third millennia BCE saw much economic and technological continuity, there was a considerable change in the style of monuments erected, particularly in what is now southern and eastern England. By 3000 BCE, the long barrows, causewayed enclosures, and cursuses that had predominated in the Early Neolithic were no longer built, and had been replaced by circular monuments of various kinds. These include earthen henges, timber circles, and stone circles. Stone circles exist in most areas of Britain where stone is available, with the exception of the island's south-eastern corner. They are most densely concentrated in south-western Britain and on the north-eastern horn of Scotland, near Aberdeen. The tradition of their construction may have lasted 2,400 years, from 3300 to 900 BCE, with the major phase of the building taking place between 3000 and 1300 BCE.

These stone circles typically show very little evidence of human visitation during the period immediately following their creation. The historian Ronald Hutton noted that this suggests that they were not sites used for rituals that left archaeologically visible evidence, but may have been deliberately left as "silent and empty monuments". The archaeologist Mike Parker Pearson argues that in Neolithic Britain, stone was associated with the dead, and wood with the living. Other archaeologists have proposed that the stone might not represent ancestors, but rather other supernatural entities, such as deities.

Stone circles were erected in the area of modern Wiltshire, the best known of which are Avebury and Stonehenge. All of the other examples are ruined, and in some cases have been destroyed. As noted by the archaeologist Aubrey Burl, these destroyed examples have left behind "only frustrating descriptions and vague positions". Most of the known Wiltshire circles were erected on low-lying positions in the landscape.

In the area south of Swindon, as many as seven possible stone circles are reported as having existed: Fir Clump Stone Circle, Swindon Old Church Stone Circle, Broome Stone Circle, Day House Lane Stone Circle, Coate Reservoir Stone Circle, Hodson Stone Circle, and Winterbourne Bassett Stone Circle. Often, these circles were only a few miles distant from one another; for instance, Fir Clump was a mile south of the Broome. All of these northern Wiltshire circles have been destroyed, although the vestiges of one survive: the stones at the Day House Lane Stone Circle at Coate (near Swindon) remain, albeit in a fallen state.

== Description ==
Fir Clump stone circle consisted of coarse sarsen megaliths, arranged as a double concentric circle. The archaeologists David Field and David McOmish noted that the circle appeared to be "slightly oval in outline". The outer ring, which was found to be fragmentary, measured 107 metres (351 ft) by 86.5 metres (284 ft) in diameter. (Note: In his 2000 book The Stone Circles of Britain, Ireland and Brittany, Burl stated that the circle had measured 115 metres (377 ft) by 94 metres (308 ft). He later retracted this as an error based on his calculations drawn from a photocopy of the original site plan provided to him by the National Monuments Record.) The inner ring measured 86.5 metres (284 ft) by 73.7 metres (242 ft) and was flattened on the northern side.

Around 125 metres (410 ft) to the west of the circle was a stone row measuring 102 metres (335 ft) in length that was aligned on a north/north-west to south/south-east axis. The double concentric circle mirrors the Winterbourne Bassett Stone Circle, which was similarly found to consist of two concentric rings; it is also possible that the Coate Reservoir site had a double circle.

== Discovery and destruction ==
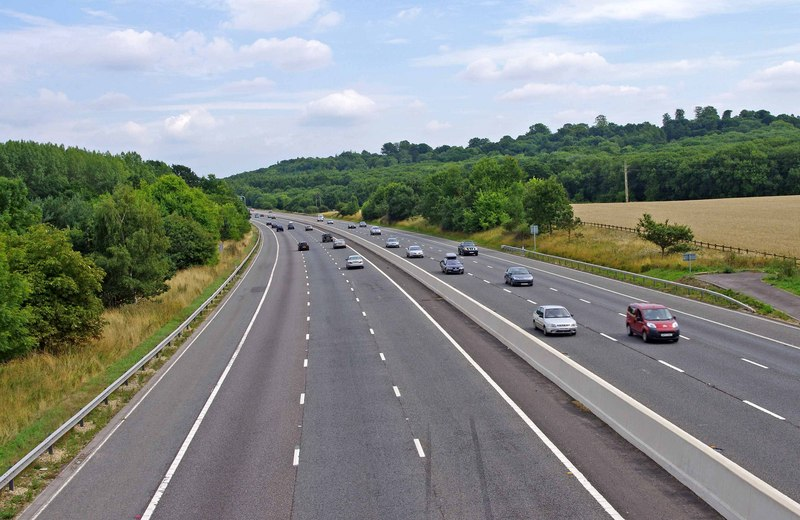
The M4 motorway with Burderop Wood on the right-hand side; the stone circle stood nearby

In the late nineteenth century, the antiquarian A. D. Passmore wrote two notebooks in which he discussed archaeological sites in Wiltshire. He recorded a local tradition that there had been a large stone circle near the railway bridge outside Swindon Old Town and the old Marlborough road to Ladder Hill. He also recorded that the circle had been broken up about thirty years prior and that he did not know how many stones had been part of the circle. He added that many small pieces of sarsen could be found at the site. The contents of Passmore's notebooks and their references to Fir Clump stone circle were not published until 2004, after they had been purchased by the Wiltshire Archaeological and Natural History Society.

In an 1894 article in The Wiltshire Archaeological and Natural History Magazine, Passmore briefly mentioned the presence of "a number of sarsens, which may or may not have formed part of a circle", at Hodson, which is adjacent to Burderop Wood. He added that a line of stones appeared to emerge from this putative circle and head in the direction of Coate. In 2000, Burl listed this description as a reference to the Fir Clump ring, although in Passmore's notebooks, published in 2004, the antiquarian differentiated the Fir Clump and Hodson examples as separate circles.

Fir Clump stone circle was rediscovered in 1965 by the borough surveyor Richard Reiss, who noted that at the time the sarsen stones were fallen. He produced a plan of the site as it then existed. In 1969, these stones were removed during construction of the M4 motorway. Burl called this destruction "a megalithic tragedy".
