= The Ridgeway School and Sixth Form College =

The Ridgeway School & Sixth Form College

Location
- Inverary Road; Wroughton, Wiltshire, SN4 9DJ; England; 51.5303°N 1.7916°W

Information
- Type: Academy
- Established: 1967
- Department for Education URN: 137160 Tables
- Ofsted: Reports
- Headteacher: Adrian Cush
- Gender: Mixed
- Age: 11 to 18
- Enrolment: 1600 (October 2023)
- Website: www.ridgewayschool.com

The Ridgeway School & Sixth Form College is a mixed secondary school and sixth form in Wroughton, near Swindon in the English county of Wiltshire.

The school was established in 1967 and was the first purpose-built comprehensive school in Wiltshire. Previously a foundation school administered by Swindon Borough Council, it converted to academy status in August 2011 and is part of the White Horse Federation, a multi-academy trust. The school continues to coordinate with Swindon Borough Council for admissions.

The school's catchment area includes Bishopstone, Hinton Parva, Wanborough, Liddington, Coate, Badbury, Chiseldon, Hodson, Bassett Down, Uffcott, Broad Hinton and Winterbourne Bassett. The school offers GCSEs and BTECs as programmes of study for pupils, while students in the sixth form have the option to study from a range of A-levels and further BTECs.

== Controversy ==
In 2005, in an attempt to aid integration after the 7 July 2005 London bombings, the local council began sending British Asian youth from Swindon (outside the normal catchment area) to the school. Some of this group formed a gang which pupils and parents called the "Asian Invasion", who bullied other pupils.

On 11 January 2007, a pupil at the school, Henry Webster thought he had agreed to a one-on-one fight with one of the Asian pupils. However, the other boy showed up with several others, including adults, and Webster suffered injuries including brain damage from a hammer. In February 2008, four people were convicted for the attack. By May, thirteen had been convicted.

In February 2010, the High Court of Justice ruled in favour of the school when it was sued by Webster and his family. He had claimed that although the attack was outside school hours, it had been caused by the school's lack of action against the "Asian Invasion". In September that year, a case review was published about the situation at the school, which recommended that all incidents of bullying should record the ethnicity of perpetrators and victims to look for racial motivations.
