= Wroughton =

Village in Wiltshire, England

Coordinates: 51.536°N 1.785°W

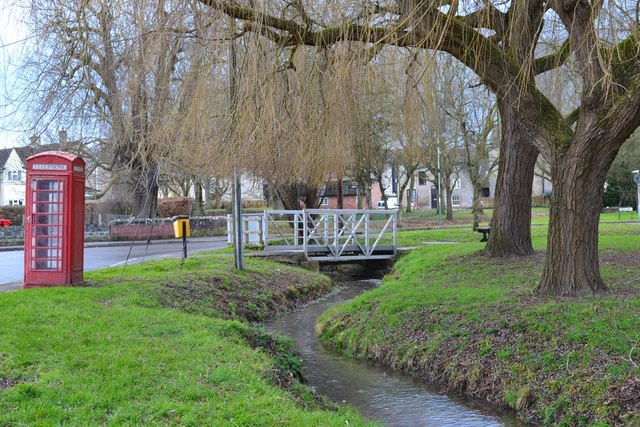
- Open space near the main road through Wroughton

- Location within Wiltshire
- Population: 8,239 (in 2021)
- OS grid reference: SU150819
- Civil parish: Wroughton
- Unitary authority: Swindon
- Ceremonial county: Wiltshire
- Region: South West
- Country: England
- Sovereign state: United Kingdom
- Post town: SWINDON
- Postcode district: SN4
- Dialling code: 01793
- Police: Wiltshire
- Fire: Dorset and Wiltshire
- Ambulance: South Western
- UK Parliament: East Wiltshire
- Website: Parish Council

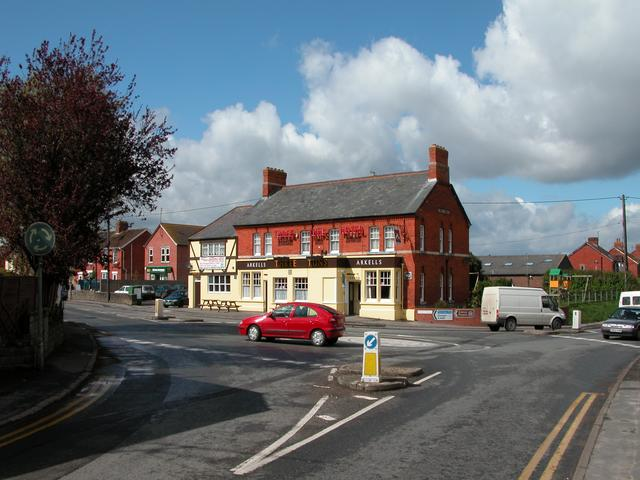
The Three Tuns public house, now closed

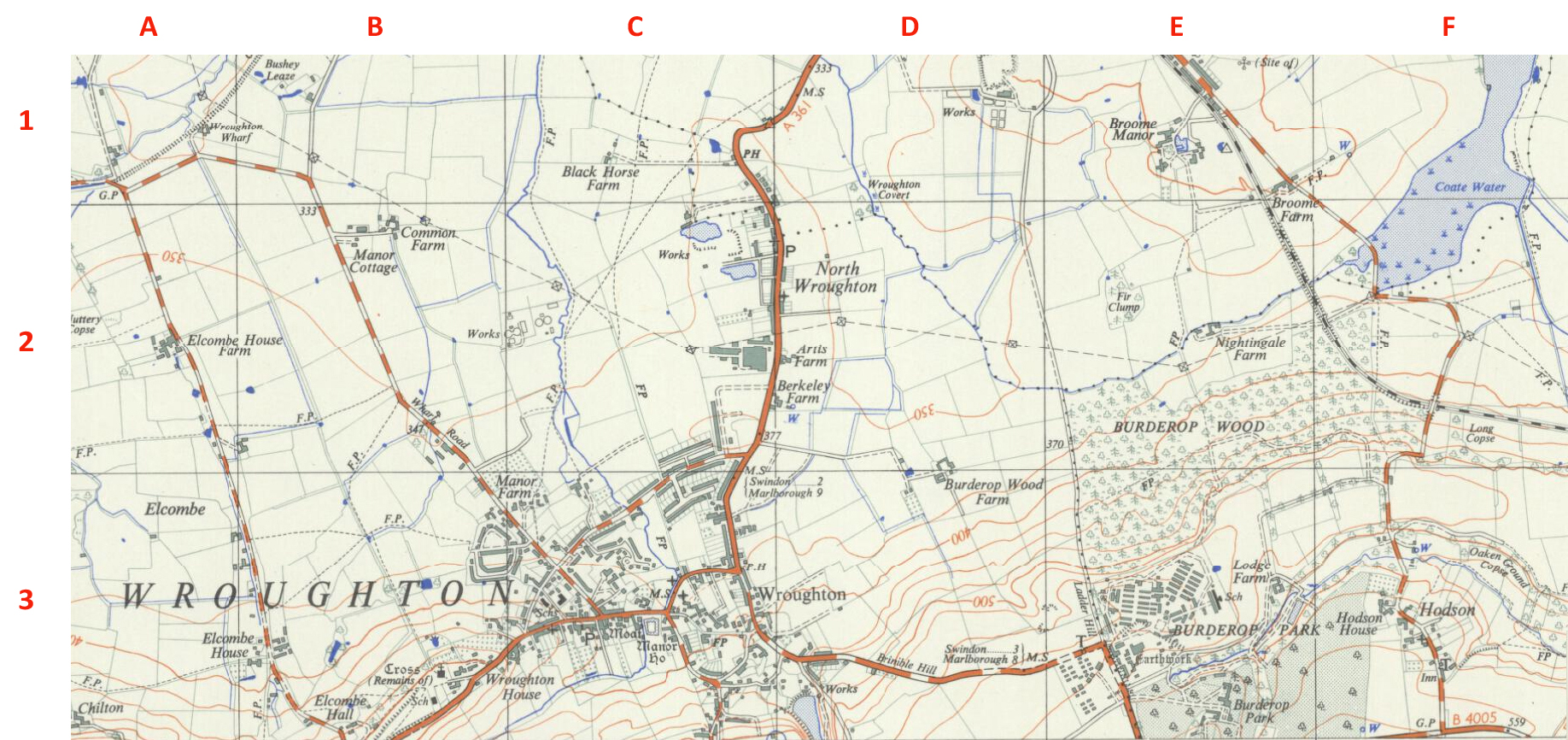
Ordnance Survey Map of 1959 showing Wroughton, Burderop Park and Hodson. Grid squares are 1 km.

Wroughton is a large village and civil parish in the Borough of Swindon, Wiltshire, England. Located between the M4 motorway and the edge of the North Wessex Downs National Landscape, it lies about 2.5 miles (4 km) south of Swindon town centre, 5 miles (8 km) east of Royal Wootton Bassett, and 7.5 miles (12 km) north of Avebury.

The parish includes the Swindon suburb of Wichelstowe as well as North Wroughton, Thorney Park, Langton Park and Alexandra Park, and the hamlets of Elcombe and Overtown.

== History ==
The earliest evidence of human presence in the area is from the Mesolithic period, although this is fairly limited. More significant evidence of settlement and occupation in the area is available for the Neolithic period, most notably due to the extensive ritual complex at Avebury and scattered finds in the locality. The earliest archaeological evidence from within Wroughton dates from the Roman period (AD 43–410), showing a period of intensive settlement and farming in the area. Occupation of the area continued into the early Middle Ages (AD 410–1066) when two battles are understood to have taken place in the area: Breahburh (AD 567), thought to have been fought by Ceawlin of Wessex on the slopes of Barbury Hill, and Ellandun (AD 825) at Elcombe Hall by Egbert of Wessex. However, there is no agreement that the latter was here (it is known to have been south of Swindon). Burial sites in the vicinity are believed to be associated with these battles.

The manor of Wroughton is recorded as Ellundune in the Domesday Book of 1086, and was later associated with the Diocese of Winchester.

Until the 19th century it was just a country village. Wroughton is close to The Ridgeway, a national path which is connected to the ancient Uffington White Horse. In the 20th century the village grew but largely avoided the effects of suburbanisation while its larger neighbour Swindon expanded rapidly to the immediate north. The construction of the M4 motorway prevented Swindon from enveloping Wroughton, which has retained a village identity, albeit with the population of a small market town (approximately 8,000 residents) in the early 21st century.

In 1874, the village celebrated for two days after the horse George Frederick which was stabled in the High Street, won The Derby. The horse and its trainer, Tom Leader, who was born in Wroughton, were escorted from Swindon railway station by a brass band and received in the village which had declared all of its pubs to be open houses and provided free beer for the occasion.

=== Wroughton Feast ===
Between 1855 and 1930, there was an "annual feast"—a week-long summer fair attended by local farmers and residents from north Wiltshire in the school holidays. Events included "A Programme of Horse, Pony, Donkey and Foot racing; climbing the greasy pole ..." the prize being a leg of mutton at the end. The event was held at the rear of the Three Tuns pub with other local fairs and a grandstand was built in the field. The main event was the "Champion Gip Fight", a bare-knuckle boxing competition between a Gypsy champion and a challenger.

Frederick Large, in his book A Swindon Retrospect 1855–1930 comments: "At Wroughton Feast, an annual festival lasting a week, it was the custom for many years for "the champion gip" to fight the best man who could be produced, for a purse of gold. The venue was the paddock at the back of the Three Tuns tavern, where the usual paraphernalia of fairs used to congregate in full force. The Feast always took place in the summer at a time which included a week of our school holidays. I was not more than seven or eight years of age when, without my parents' consent, I wandered over to Wroughton ... This annual event always commenced on a Sunday evening by friends and neighbours from Swindon, Wroughton and neighbouring villages congregating at the Three Tuns, where, crowded inside and out, large quantities of beer and spirits were consumed. A miniature grand stand was erected for Feast Week in an orchard adjoining the paddock, upon which many of the elite of the neighbourhood, both ladies and gentlemen, occupied seats, and indulged freely in choice fruits and refreshments."

== Parish church ==
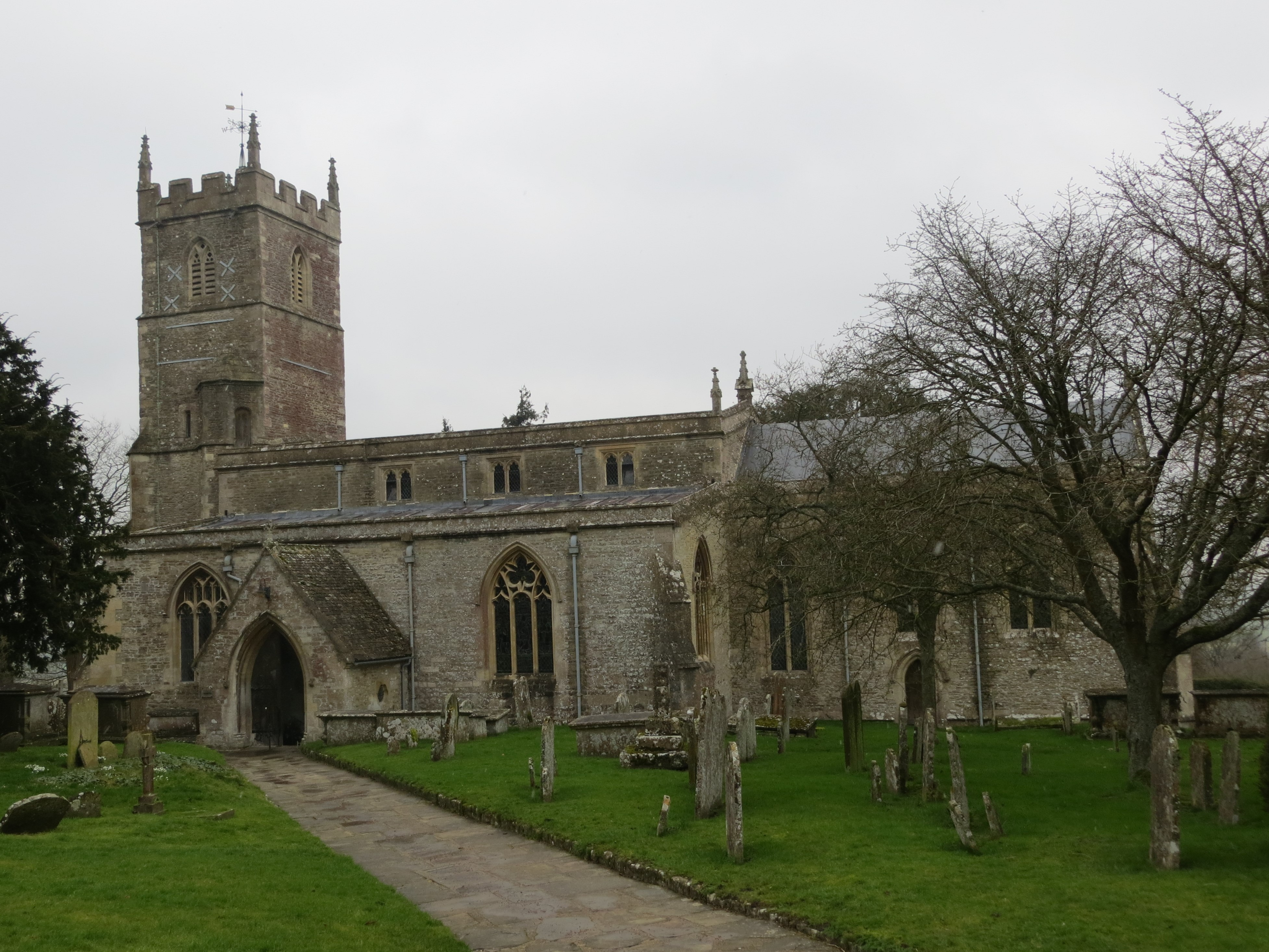
Church of St John and St Helen

The Church of England parish church of St John the Baptist and St Helen stands on a ridge above the southwest of the present village, near the road to Avebury. The present church is the result of remodelling in the 14th and 15th centuries but the Norman north and south doorways indicate an earlier building, of which the north arcade survived until T.H. Wyatt replaced it during restoration work in 1846. The church was designated as Grade I listed in 1955.

The shallow bowl of the font, simply decorated, is from the 13th century. The oldest of the six bells is dated 1596, and three others are from the next century. Stained glass in the 1852 east window is by Powell and Sons.

The ecclesiastical parish extends a little further north than the civil parish, to take in the large housing areas at Wichelstowe which began to be built in 2006. At some point the name of the parish was changed to Wroughton and Wichelstowe.

== Amenities ==
=== Schools ===
The Ridgeway School and Sixth Form College opened in 1967 as Wiltshire's first purpose-built comprehensive school. It teaches about 1,500 children aged 11–18. The catchment area includes Bishopstone, Hinton Parva, Wanborough, Liddington, Coate, Badbury, Chiseldon, Hodson, Uffcott, Broad Hinton and Winterbourne Bassett.

=== RAF Wroughton ===
RAF Wroughton, just south of the village, closed in the 1990s. The site is now the Science Museum at Wroughton, a part of the Science Museum Group and used as a storage site occasionally open to the public. Since 2016, television series The Grand Tour has used part of the northern perimeter road as a car test track.

=== Ellendune Centre ===
The Ellendune Centre is a sports and entertainment venue that boasts one of the larger amateur facilities in the local area. It plays host to amateur dramatic groups who use it to meet and perform, including the Ellendune Entertainers and WADAMS (Wroughton Amateur Dramatic and Musical Society).

=== Wroughton reservoir ===
Wroughton reservoir on Overtown Hill Road is a live fishing site. The main types of fish are Tench, Bream, Crucian Carp, Rudd and Carp. The reservoir is 1.01 hectares in size and the water is fed from the large area of fields above.

== Sport ==
Wroughton ASC Swimming Club trains young swimmers and competes in team galas both locally and across Wiltshire, as well as the annual Wiltshire County Championships. There is also a local football club, this is for youths and men.

A greyhound racing track was opened in the fields opposite the Black Horse Hotel and Inn in North Wroughton on 26 July 1930. The race distance was 500 yards. The racing was independent (not affiliated to the sports governing body the National Greyhound Racing Club) and it was known as a flapping track which was the nickname given to independent tracks. It is not known when the racing ended.

For many years, the twinning committee organised a fun Bowls/Pétanque tournament. Some Saint-Germinois would come from the twin-town to play on Wroughton's boulodrome (pétanque terrain) and some Wroughtonians would return the compliment on St Germain's bowling green.

== Governance ==
The local authority is Swindon Borough Council, a unitary authority. Wroughton forms part of the council's Wroughton and Wichelstowe ward.

== Notable people ==
- Fiona Benson, poet, born in Wroughton in 1978
- Sir Henry Langton, later Calley (1914–1997), RAF pilot, county councillor and Chairman of Wiltshire County Council, lived at Wroughton
- Geoffrey Cox, Attorney General for England and Wales and MP for the Torridge and West Devon constituency, born in Wroughton
- Jahméne Aaron Douglas, singer, runner-up to James Arthur on the ninth series of The X Factor in 2012, brought up in Wroughton
- William Gosling (VC) (1892–1945), recipient of the Victoria Cross in 1917, farmer at Wroughton
- Sir Robert Buckland, former Lord Chancellor, Secretary of State for Justice, Secretary of State for Wales and Solicitor General for England and Wales and MP for Swindon South constituency (2010-2024) lived at Wroughton.

== Twin Town ==
Wroughton is twinned with

- Saint-Germain-lès-Corbeil, France
