= Hodson Stone Circle =

Neolithic stone circle in Wiltshire, England

Hodson Stone Circle was a stone circle in the village of Hodson in the south-western English county of Wiltshire. The ring was part of a tradition of stone circle construction that spread throughout much of Britain, Ireland, and Brittany during the Late Neolithic and Early Bronze Age, over a period between 3300 and 900 BCE. The purpose of such monuments is unknown, although some archaeologists speculate that the stones represented supernatural entities for the circle's builders.

The circle was discovered and recorded by the antiquarian A. D. Passmore in the 1890s. He briefly mentioned it in an article published in The Wiltshire Archaeological and Natural History Magazine, while detailing it in greater depth in his unpublished notebooks. He recorded the circle as consisting of eight stones at that time, with a possible avenue or stone row emerging from it and facing in the direction of the circle at Coate. Later archaeologists have noted that some of the sarsens used as building material in Hodson were once part of the circle.

== Context ==
While the transition from the Early Neolithic to the Late Neolithic in the fourth and third millennia BCE saw much economic and technological continuity, there was a considerable change in the style of monuments erected, particularly in what is now southern and eastern England. By 3000 BCE, the long barrows, causewayed enclosures, and cursuses that had predominated in the Early Neolithic were no longer built, and had been replaced by circular monuments of various kinds. These include earthen henges, timber circles, and stone circles. Stone circles are found in most areas of Britain where stone is available, with the exception of the island's south-eastern corner. They are most densely concentrated in south-western Britain and on the north-eastern horn of Scotland, near Aberdeen. The tradition of their construction may have lasted for 2,400 years, from 3300 to 900 BCE, with the major phase of building taking place between 3000 and 1,300 BCE.

These stone circles typically show very little evidence of human visitation during the period immediately following their creation. The historian Ronald Hutton noted that this suggests that they were not sites used for rituals that left archaeologically visible evidence, but may have been deliberately left as "silent and empty monuments". The archaeologist Mike Parker Pearson argues that in Neolithic Britain, stone was associated with the dead, and wood with the living. Other archaeologists have proposed that the stone might not represent ancestors, but rather other supernatural entities, such as deities.

Various stone circles were erected in the area of modern Wiltshire, the best known of which are Avebury and Stonehenge. All of the other examples are ruined, and in some cases have been destroyed. As noted by the archaeologist Aubrey Burl, these destroyed examples have left behind "only frustrating descriptions and vague positions". Most of the known Wiltshire circles were erected on low-lying positions in the landscape. In the area south of Swindon, a town in northern Wiltshire, at least seven stone circles are reported as having existed, often only a few miles distant from one another; the Fir Clump Stone Circle was for instance a mile south of the Broome Stone Circle. All of these northern Wiltshire circles have been destroyed, although the vestiges of one survives: the stones at the Day House Lane Stone Circle in Coate, Swindon remain, albeit in a fallen state.

== Antiquarian investigation ==
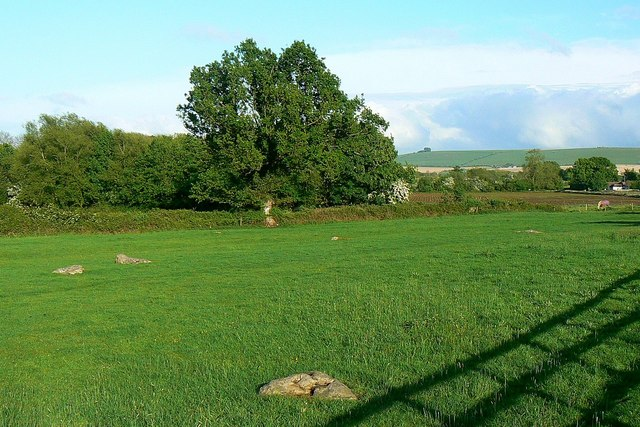
The remains of the Day House Lane Stone Circle, which Passmore suggested might have connected to the Hodson Stone Circle with a stone avenue

In an 1894 article published in The Wiltshire Archaeological and Natural History Magazine, the antiquarian A. D. Passmore related that he was aware of "a number of sarsens" which he thought might have been part of a stone circle. He noted that from these, a line of stones appeared to emerge and head in the direction of Coate. Passmore also produced two notebooks during that decade in which he wrote down observations deriving from his archaeological fieldwork in the region. Here he recorded more about the circle. He observed that a road cut through the circle and several barns encroached on it, meaning that it was "very difficult to find". The contents of Passmore's notebooks and their references to the Fir Clump Stone Circle were not published until 2004, after they had been purchased by the Wiltshire Archaeological and Natural History Society.

In his notebook, Passmore noted that he could find eight stones as part of the circle. He also discovered three stones inside the circle, suggesting that these may have been part of an inner circle – in which case the circle would have had two concentric rings, akin to the Day House Lane circle. Alternatively, he suggested that the stones inside the circle may simply have been dumped there by farmers wanting them out of the way. He also suggested that the circle was about 250 feet (76m) in diameter, and was thus of a similar size to the Day House Lane circle. He identified "4 distinct lines of stone" emerging from the circle, suggesting that if this line continued all the way to Coate then it may have attached to the row of stones he also thought emerged from the Day House Lane ring.

In their 2017 book on prehistoric Wiltshire, the archaeologists David Field and David McOmish noted that a stone circle was "thought to have been present" in Hodson, and that any stones once part of it might now be found as some of the sarsens lying loose around the village or incorporated into the fabric of various buildings.
