= Burderop Park =

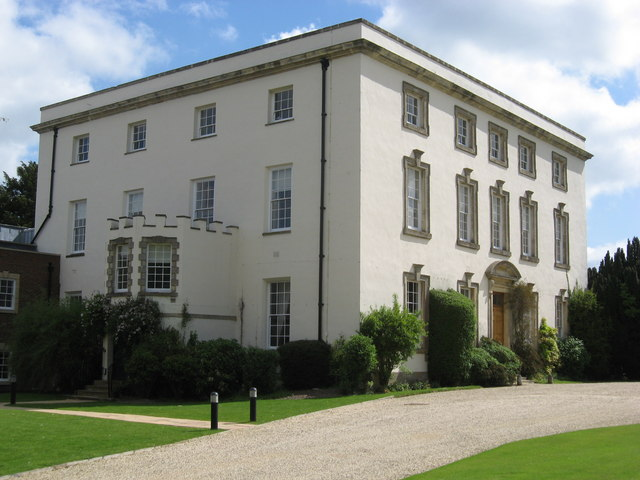
- Burderop House in 2008

- Location within Wiltshire

General information
- Location: Hodson, Wiltshire, England
- Coordinates: 51.5199°N 1.7612°W
- Construction started: Early 17th century
- Completed: 18th century
- Client: William Calley

Technical details
- Structural system: Brick

Burderop Park is a Grade II* listed country manor house near Chiseldon, Wiltshire, England. The house was constructed in the early 17th century to a courtyard design, and was turned into a three-storey square house with bay windows during the 18th century. It is the manor house of the hamlet of Hodson, to the east.

== History ==
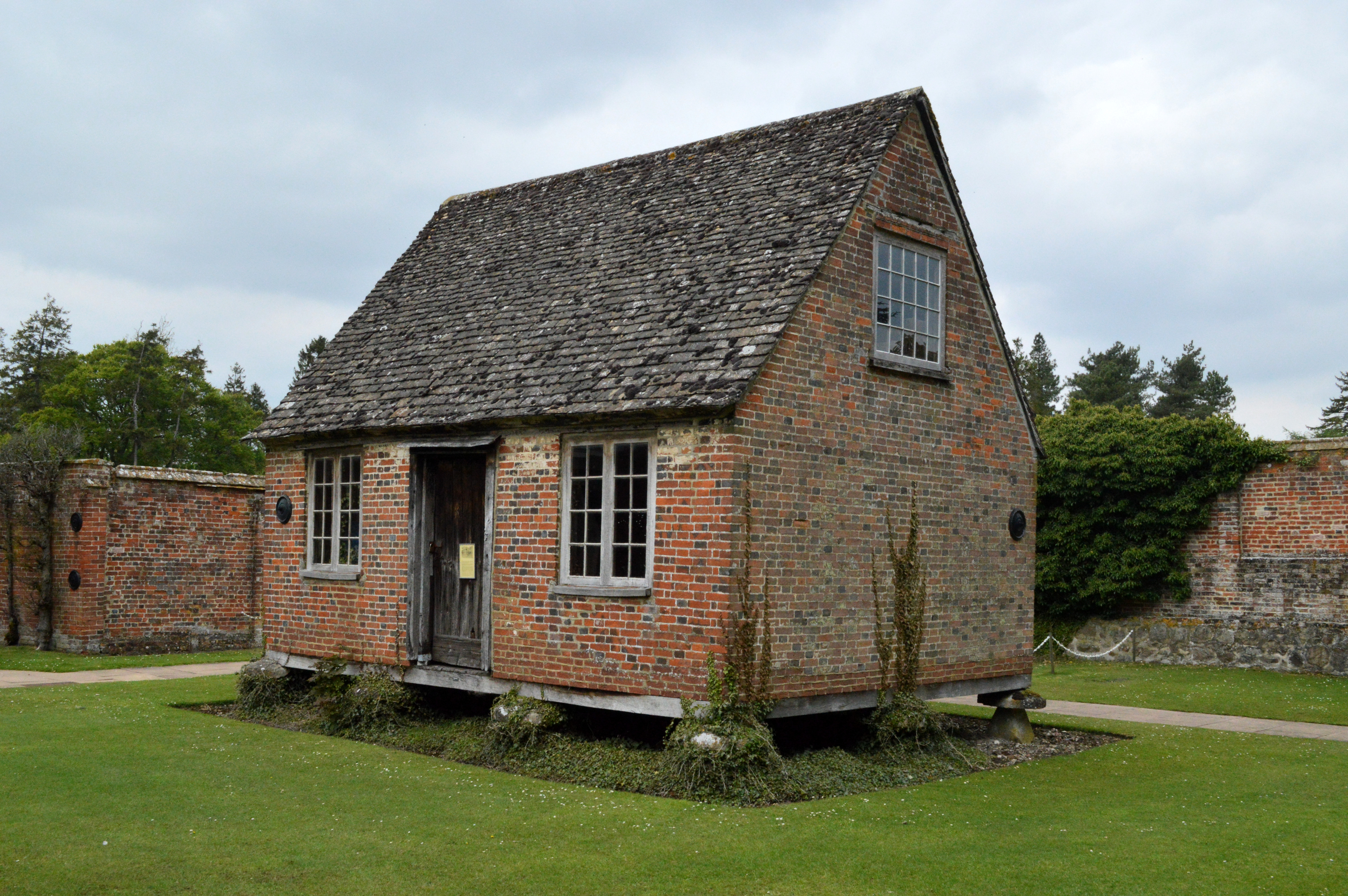
The granary in the kitchen court

The Calley family lived at Burderop for over two centuries; in 1649 William Calley was High Sheriff of Wiltshire and in 1807 Thomas Calley held the title. Thomas was married to Elizabeth Keck, daughter of Anthony James Keck of Stoughton Grange; they had a son John James Calley, who sold the estate to John Parkinson, who held the estate as a trustee for the Duke of Wellington. The estates of Broad Hinton and Salthrop House were also owned by Thomas Calley and his wife, and were sold in 1860 by the second Duke of Wellington to Anthony M. S. Maskelyne of Bassets Down. The estate was for a time known as Okebourne Chace.

== World Wars ==
During the First World War, and again during the second, the park land was used as a training camp for the British army. In the first war, Chiseldon Camp was established on the estate and was occupied only by British forces, but in the second war it became the first camp in Britain to receive American troops, with the result that US forces were concentrated at Chiseldon over the next two years.

In the Second World War, Burderop Park became home to the US 154th General Hospital. After the war, the US military remained, and the site became the home of the 7505th USAF field hospital, treating American personnel and their families stationed in Britain until 1965, when the military left - offering to leave their medical equipment to the NHS. It then became a NHS Hospital for long term mental patients closing in 1994

Burderop Park was not the only military hospital in the area during the Second World War, there being the US 130th Station Hospital at Chiseldon Camp and the hospital at RAF Wroughton, later known as Princess Alexandra Hospital, RAF Wroughton, which opened in 1942, on which the RAF Flag was lowered in 1996.

The 1959 Ordnance Survey map shows Burderop Park still with huts from the war (cell E3).

== Post-war ==
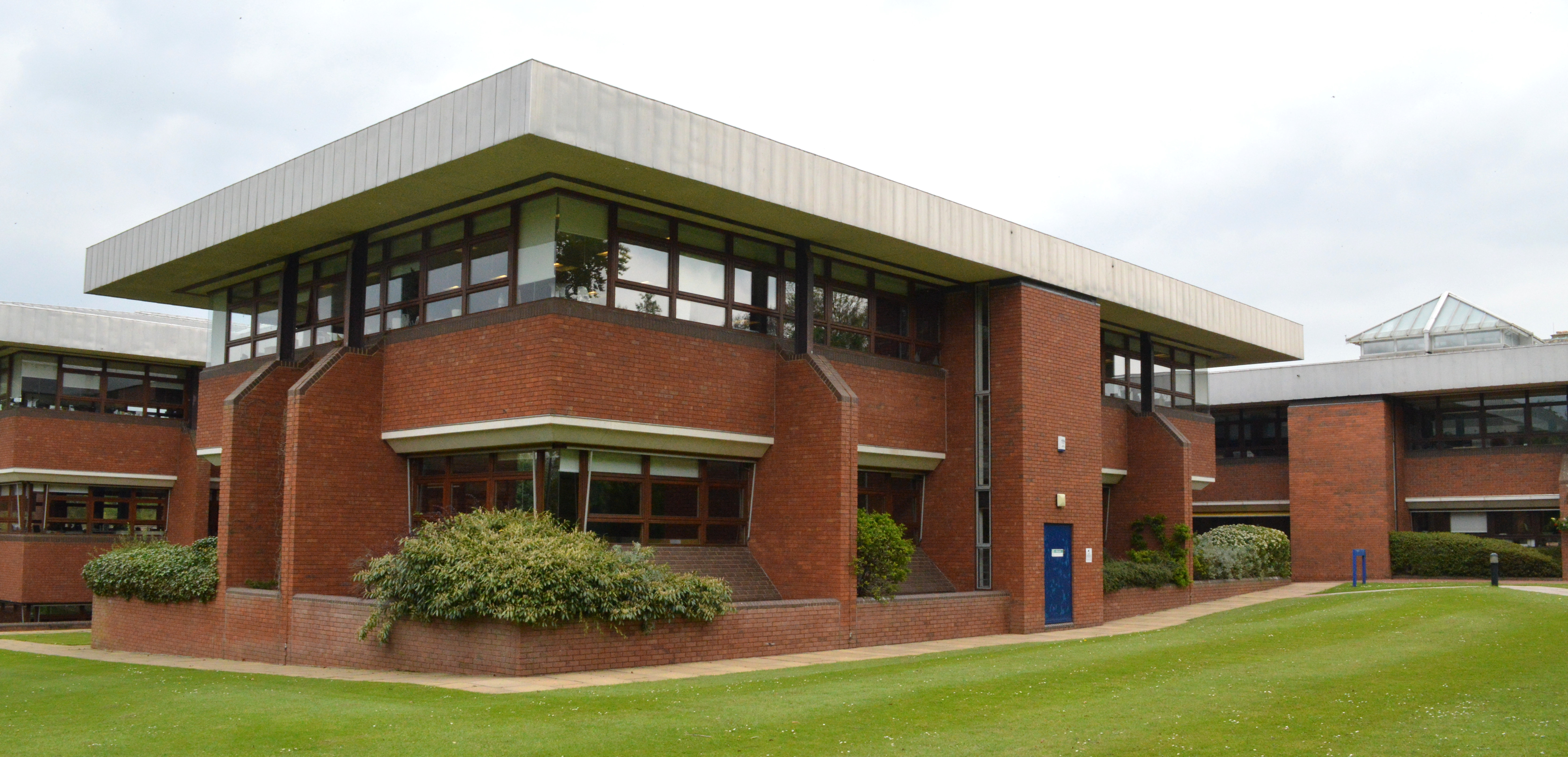
Halcrow offices in 2013

The house was recorded as Grade II* listed in 1955.

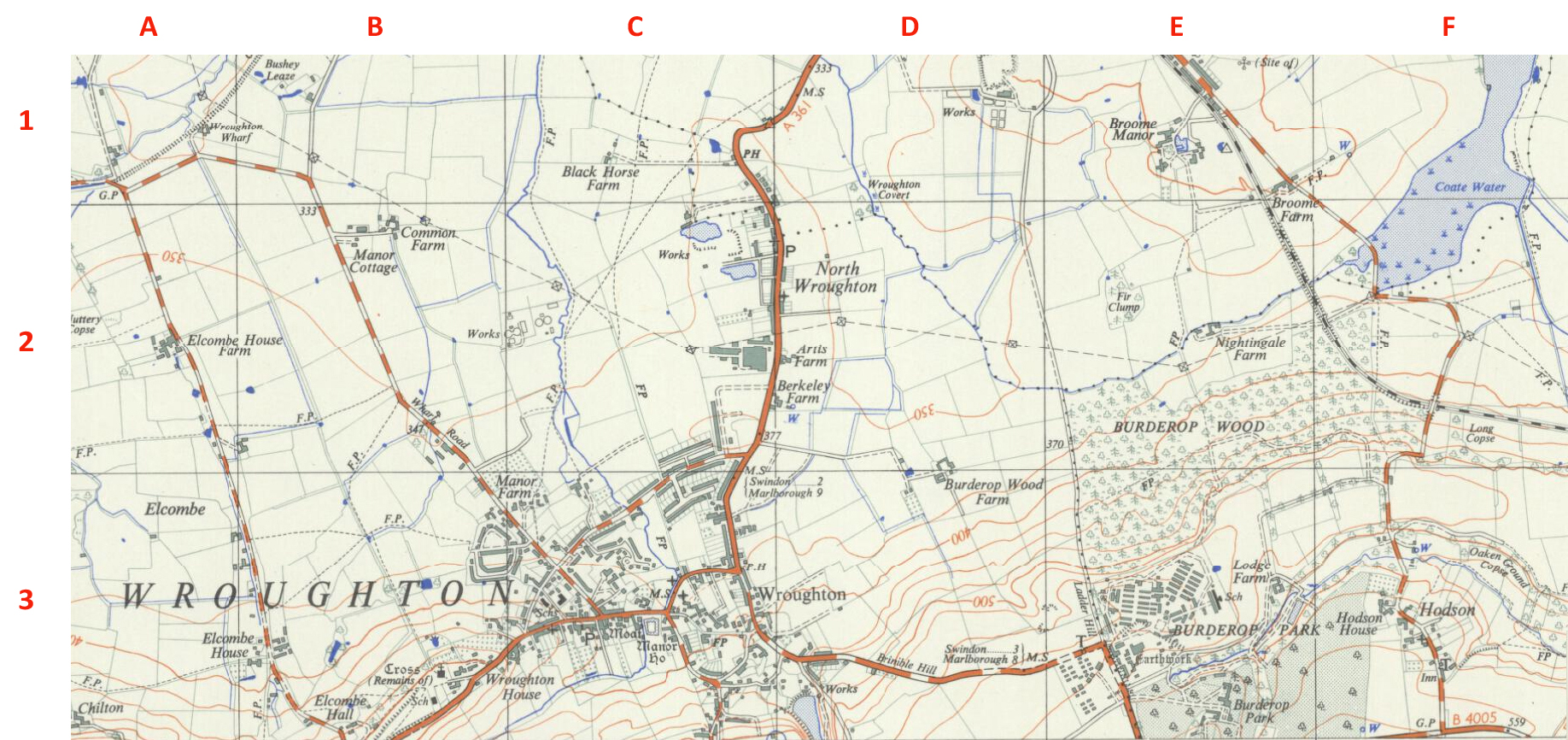
Ordnance Survey Map, 1959, showing Wroughton, Burderop Park and Hodson

The house post hospital closure became part of a complex of buildings used for commercialised agricultural landholding and office space for CH2M, and previously for the Halcrow Group. In 2023 the house was bought by a property developer to turn into a family home Within the House Grounds planning permission was granted for new build housing which has now been built in 2024

The former hospital site is to become the site of an Amazon data centre for which planning permission was granted in 2021.

== Interior ==
The house has oak panelling and plaster ceilings dating from the 17th century, with 18th-century marble fireplaces. There is a painted coat of arms of William Calley dated 1663 over the original fireplace in a first-floor bedroom. Two other rooms have 17th-century paintwork on the walls, including a Jacobean-style panelling design. Part of a newel stair survives in the centre of the north wing, which is thought to be a former stair-turret.

== Surroundings ==
The north of the estate is Burderop Wood, which was designated a 'Biological Site of Special Scientific Interest' in 1971 for its wet ash-maple and acid pedunculate oak-hazel-ash woodland.
