= Charlbury Hill =

Hill in Wiltshire, England

Coordinates: 51.5376°N 1.6585°W

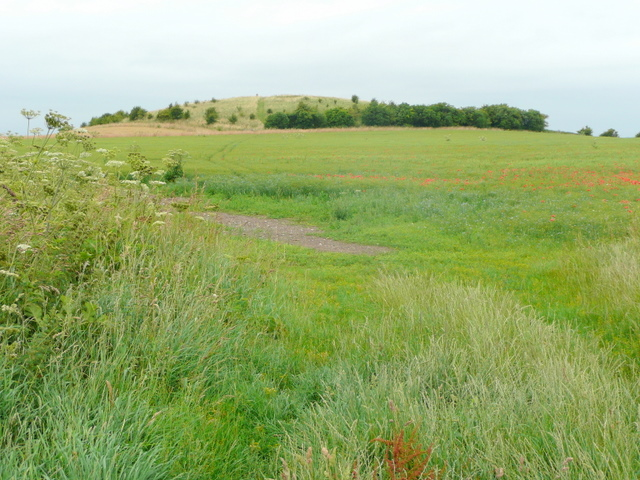

Highest point
- Elevation: 253 m (830 ft)
- Prominence: 64 m (210 ft)

Geography
- Parent range: The Ridgeway
- OS grid: SU2378582129

Climbing
- Normal route: Path from The Ridgeway
- Access: Open Access Land

Charlbury Hill is a hill near the villages of Hinton Parva and Bishopstone in the Borough of Swindon, England.

Historically within Wiltshire, the hill lies just north of The Ridgeway. The summit is 253 m (830 ft) above sea level with a prominence of 64 m (210 ft). The hill is classified as a TuMP (hill of 30 m or greater prominence) on the Database of British and Irish Hills. There is an Ordnance Survey (OS) triangulation pillar (TP1392 Charlbury Hill) located 6 m away from the highest point. The top of the hill is open access land with a permissive path from The Ridgeway.

== Name ==
Andrews and Dury's A Topographical Map of Wiltshire (1773) gives the name as Shelbarrow Hill and later maps give the name Shalborough Hill. It has also been called Skelbarrow Hill and has been spelt Charbury Hill.

The OS first edition one-inch-to-the-mile map (1829–1830) gives the current name and spelling of Charlbury Hill which has been used since, including the current OS 1:25k Explorer and 1:50k Landranger maps.

== History ==
Despite the close proximity to The Ridgeway and other ancient sites such as Liddington Castle, there have been no archaeological discoveries recorded on the hilltop. There are two mounds resembling barrows but these have been recorded as natural features.

The hill is a popular viewing point but has also been the site of antisocial behaviour.
