= Alfred Edmonds =

Canadian artist, draughtsman and cartographer (1821–1893)

Alfred M. Edmonds (1821 – November 23, 1893) was a Canadian artist, draughtsman and cartographer.

== Birth ==
Edmonds was born in 1821 at Bishopstone, Berkshire, England.

== Professional career ==
He was listed as a school teacher in Burnstown, Ontario, in 1863. He was also listed as a draughtsman in the same year. In 1872 he produced a sketchbook for the Haycock Iron Mine of Cantley, Quebec. From 1881 until his death, he was a cartographer for the Canadian Pacific Railway and then the Canada Department of Railways and Canals. In 1884, he is recorded as an assistant to Sir Sandford Fleming

== Honors ==
Edmonds was awarded a prize in the category Pencil Drawings at the Upper Canada Provincial Exhibition of 1863. He received a commission from the Governor General of Canada, Sir Frederick Hamilton-Temple-Blackwood, Marquess of Dufferin, in 1873.

== Death ==
Edmonds died of natural causes in Ottawa on November 23, 1893, and is buried in Beechwood, the National Cemetery of Canada. The death occurred in the Ottawa Protestant Hospital. Edmonds was a jail inmate at the time. When arrested, Edmonds was referred to as "a pale, delicate-looking man, who it is thought was insane." A coroner's inquest concluded, "We wish ... to express our disapproval in the detention in jail of such a case ... which was one for a charitable institution."

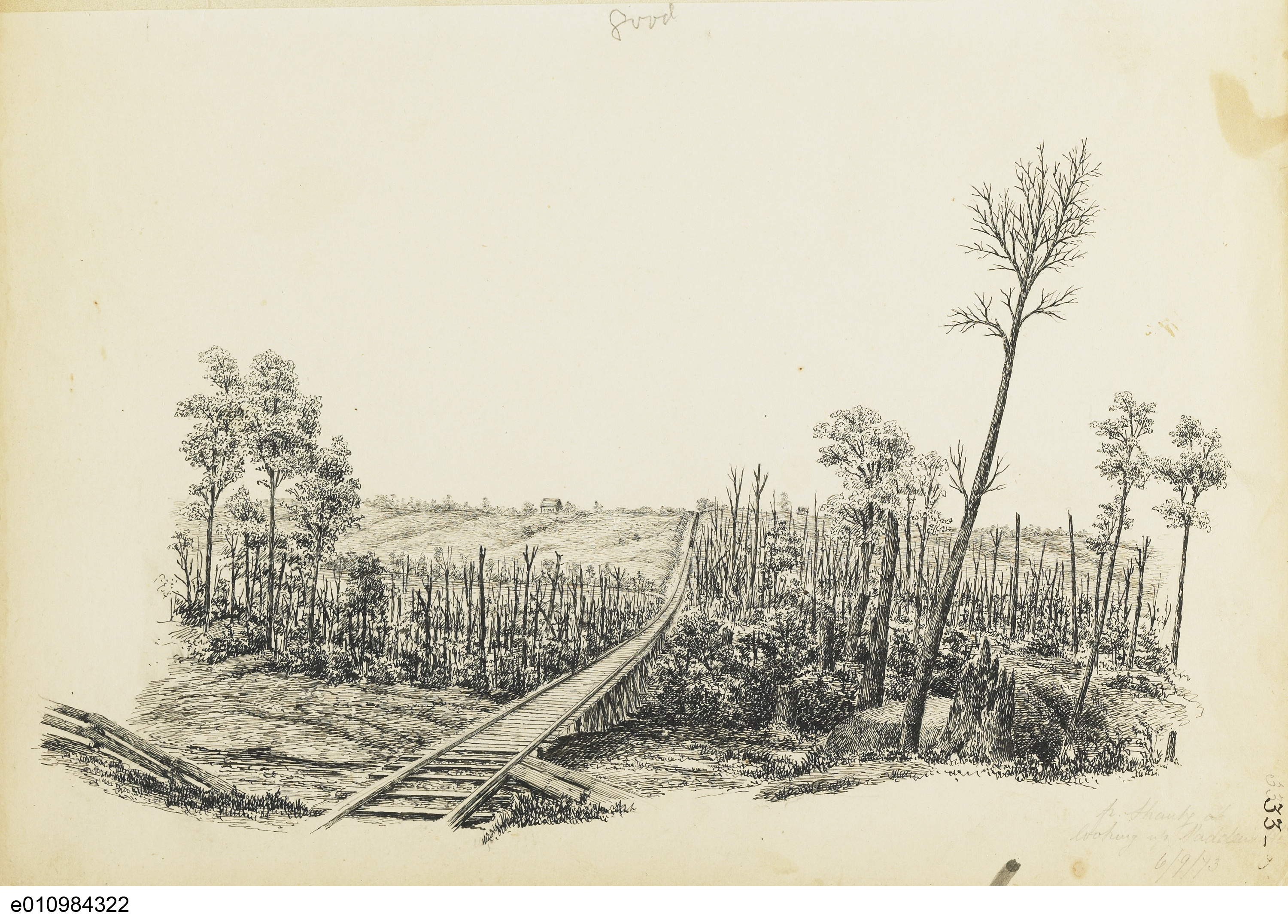
Sketch from Haycock Mine Sketchbook, Library and Archives Canada
