= The Coombes, Hinton Parva =

Protected area in Wiltshire, England

Coordinates: 51.54184°N 1.67263°W

The Coombes (grid reference SU228826) is a 15.9 hectare biological Site of Special Scientific Interest at Hinton Parva in the Borough of Swindon, England, notified in 1989.

Within a steep-sided dry valley on the edge of the Marlborough Downs, the chalk grassland is important for its variety of grasses and associated species of butterfly. The 39-acre (16 ha) site is owned by the National Trust.
