= Day House Lane Stone Circle =

Neolithic stone circle in Wiltshire, England

- Coate Stone Circle
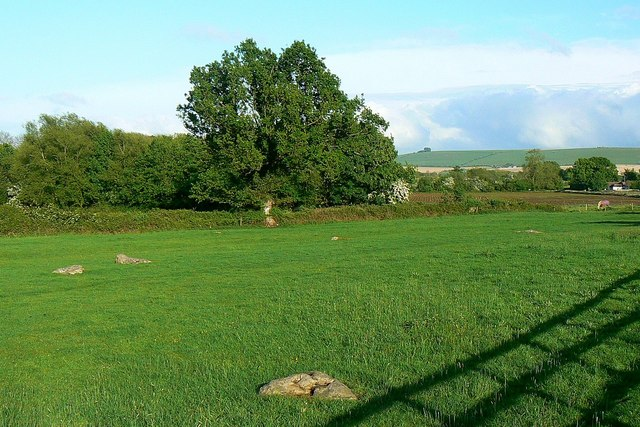
- The five stones of the Day House Lane Stone Circle

- Location within Wiltshire
- 51°32′24″N 1°44′20″W
- Type: Stone circle
- Periods: Neolithic / Bronze Age
- Location: Near Coate

Day House Lane Stone Circle, also known as Coate Stone Circle, is a stone circle near the hamlet of Coate, now on the southeastern edge of Swindon, in the English county of Wiltshire. The ring was part of a tradition of stone circle construction that spread throughout much of Britain, Ireland, and Brittany during the Late Neolithic and Early Bronze Age, over a period between 3300 and 900 BCE. The purpose of such monuments is unknown, although some archaeologists speculate that the stones represented supernatural entities for the circle's builders.

Five partly buried stones remain at the site. A circle of sarsen megaliths, Day House Lane Stone Circle probably had an original diameter of about 69 metres and possibly contained over thirty stones. It was one of at least seven stone circles that are known to have been erected in the area south of Swindon in northern Wiltshire. The earliest known reference to the site was made by the local writer Richard Jefferies in the 1860s. When the antiquarian A. D. Passmore investigated the site during the 1890s he found nine stones, mostly buried. He observed a line of five stones not far from the circle's northern end, suggesting that these were part of a prehistoric avenue connected to the circle; these too no longer existed by the 21st century.

== Location ==
The stone circle is located immediately to the northeast of Day House Farm, at the front of the building. The land on which it is situated is a flat clay plain at the foot of the chalk escarpment. It would have been intervisible with several other prehistoric monuments located on the Ridgeway.

The circle is about a quarter of a mile from the former village of Coate and two miles southeast from the centre of the town of Swindon. The site is about 9 miles (14 km) northeast of Avebury stone circle. The circle is a scheduled monument under the Ancient Monuments and Archaeological Areas Act 1979.

== Context ==
While the transition from the Early Neolithic to the Late Neolithic in the fourth and third millennia BCE saw much economic and technological continuity, there was a considerable change in the style of monuments erected, particularly in what is now southern and eastern England. By 3000 BCE, the long barrows, causewayed enclosures, and cursuses which had predominated in the Early Neolithic were no longer built, and had been replaced by circular monuments of various kinds. These include earthen henges, timber circles, and stone circles. Stone circles are found in most areas of Britain where stone is available, with the exception of the island's south-eastern corner. They are most densely concentrated in south-western Britain and on the north-eastern horn of Scotland, near Aberdeen. The tradition of their construction may have lasted for 2,400 years, from 3300 to 900 BCE, with the major phase of building taking place between 3000 and 1,300 BCE.

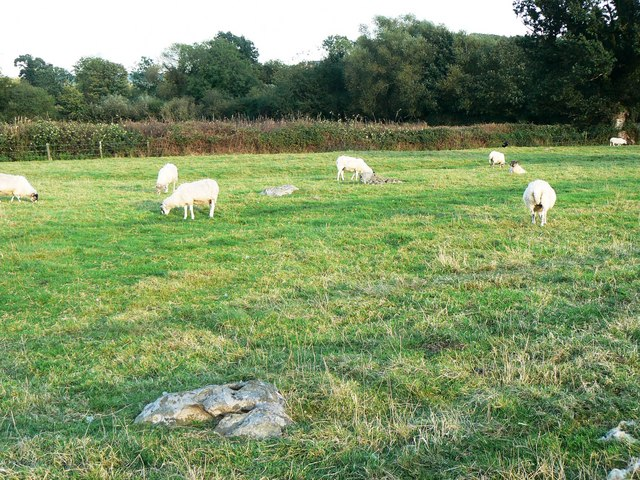
Sheep grazing around some of the stones in the Day House Lane Circle

These stone circles typically show very little evidence of human visitation during the period immediately following their creation. For this reason the historian Ronald Hutton suggested that the circles were not used for rituals that left archaeologically visible evidence, but may have been deliberately left as "silent and empty monuments". The archaeologist Mike Parker Pearson argues that in Neolithic Britain, stone was associated with the dead, and wood with the living. Other archaeologists have proposed that the stone might not represent ancestors, but rather other supernatural entities, such as deities.

In the area of modern Wiltshire, various stone circles were erected, the best known of which are Avebury and Stonehenge. All of the other examples are ruined, and in some cases have been destroyed. As noted by the archaeologist Aubrey Burl, these examples have left behind "only frustrating descriptions and vague positions". Most of the known Wiltshire examples were erected on low-lying positions in the landscape. In the area south of Swindon, a town in northern Wiltshire, at least seven stone circles are reported as having existed, often only a few miles distant from one another; the Day House Lane Stone Circle is for instance 2 km north-east of the (now destroyed) Fir Clump Stone Circle. Although the vestiges of the Day House Lane Stone Circle survive, all of the other known northern Wiltshire circles have been destroyed.

== Description ==
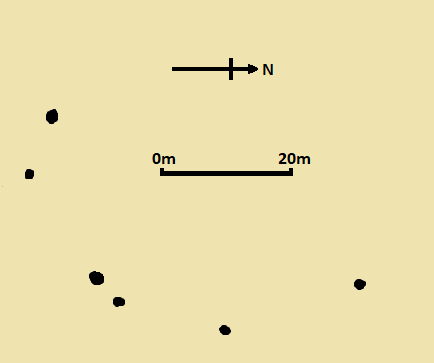
Diagram of the Day House Lane Stone Circle as recorded in 1980

Based on his observations in the 1890s, the antiquarian A. D. Passmore estimated that the circle had originally been up to 69 metres (225 ft) in diameter. He also thought that it would have been of a slightly irregular shape, with its diameter varying at different points. Based on the surviving stones and their spacing, Passmore suggested that the circle would have once contained over thirty stones. The surviving stones were sarsen blocks. In the 1890s, Passmore recorded nine stones surviving as part of the circle, but by the early 21st century there were only five. Passmore's investigation found that some of the stones were up to 3.0 metres (10 ft) in length.

It is possible that there were stone rows or avenues connecting to the circle. In the 1890s, Passmore recorded a line of five stones leading towards the northern side of the circle, which might have represented such an avenue, although by the 21st century these stones were also gone. In March 2009, work overseen by the Highways Agency revealed two large sarsen boulders opposite Day House Farm.

Writing in 1980, the archaeologist Aubrey Burl stated that the circle was "almost completely overgrown", an assessment he repeated in 2000. The Historic England listing for the site nevertheless considered it to be a "comparatively well preserved example of its class".

== Antiquarian and archaeological research ==
The earliest known antiquarian observation of Day House Lane Stone Circle came from about 1867 when the naturalist and writer Richard Jefferies described coming across it. He was familiar with the area, and his wife had spent some of her early years living at Day House Farm. His comments on the circle would be published posthumously in the 1896 book Jefferies' Land: A History of Swindon and Its Environs.

Jefferies related that he had found "five Sarsden [sic] stones much sunk into the ground, but forming a semi-circle of which the lane is the base-line or tangent. There was a sixth upon the edge of the lane, but it was blown up and removed, in order to make the road more serviceable, a few years ago." He suggested that it looked like a "Druidical" circle and might have been made by the druids, but noted that whether this was the case or not "cannot now be determined". Jefferies also observed that in an adjacent field, which was known as the Plain, could be found three more sarsens, one of which was much larger than the others.

=== A. D. Passmore's investigation ===
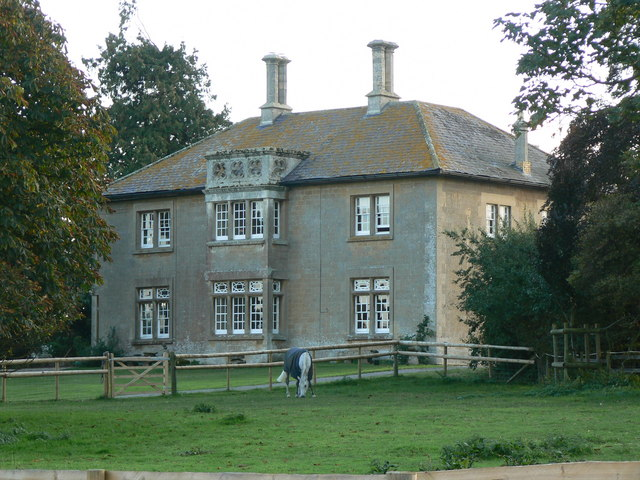
The Day House Farm, in front of which the circle is located

The antiquarian A. D. Passmore outlined his investigation of the stone circle in an 1894 article for the Wiltshire Archaeological and Natural History Magazine. As part of this he thanked W. Handy, the tenant of Day House Farm, for "the kind way in which he has allowed me to explore his fields". In his private notebooks he related that he first discovered them in January 1893. Passmore related that at that time all of the stones in the circle were prostrate and largely buried beneath the ground. They were, he noted, "not at all conspicuous", with none protruding for more than 18 inches above the turf and some barely visible.

Passmore probed the ground with an iron bar to ascertain the location and dimensions of various stones in the circle. He also dug into the space between those stones he numbered four and five, discovering a piece of burnt sarsen and patch of white ash beneath the ground, evidence for the burning and cracking of sarsen on the site. He observed that the western part of the circle was largely occupied by cow yards and rick yards and suggested that most of the stones in this area had been broken up or removed. He commented on the presence of some "big fragments" of sarsen lying around the vicinity and an area of sarsen paving, suggesting that these stones had once been part of the circle before being removed and repurposed.

Passmore noted that in a field to the southwest of the farmhouse stood three large sarsen boulders. One, which was lying on its side, measured at least 0.91 metres (3 ft) and 2.1 metres (7 ft) long. The other two were smaller. Passmore related that an old man had recollected seeing other stones in this field being broken up many decades previously. The old man thought that there had once been a full circle of stones in the field, although Passmore considered this testimony "not sufficiently strong to build upon". Passmore also related finding flint tools and crude pieces of pottery in the field near these sarsens.

Passmore also observed a third feature in the vicinity. This was a row of five stones beside the road in front of the farm; one was on the eastern side of the road, the other four being on the western side or in an adjacent ditch. He noted that several of these stones were "of considerable size". Passmore suggested that this may have once formed a prehistoric avenue which could have extended to meet the northern side of the Day House Lane Stone Circle. Passmore rejected the idea that these stones had never formed a deliberate row and had simply been moved to the side of the road by farmers eager to get them out of their fields. If that were the case, he reasoned, there would not be such even spacing between the third and fourth, and then the fourth and fifth, of these stones. He also suggested that if farmers wished to remove the stones from their fields, they would break them up into smaller fragments rather than going to the effort of moving them whole.

== Cultural heritage ==
In the late 2000s, the Swindon Gateway Partnership put forward proposals to build 1,800 homes and a university campus near Coate Water. Local residents raised concerns that this development would harm the archaeology of the area and damage any opportunity to use it to encourage tourism. The Swindon Advertiser quoted Jean Saunders of the Jefferies Land Conservation Trust as saying that with sites like the Day House Farm Stone Circle, two round barrows, and a Bronze Age settlement in the area, Coate could "create almost a mini-Avebury" but that that possibility would be quashed if development went ahead. Campaigners opposed to the residential development asked the government to designate the impacted locale as a conservation area to protect its heritage. The anti-development campaign failed and after the authorities gave their backing to the construction project, the Swindon Civic Voice group organised a two-day event in April 2014 to celebrate Coate's heritage and encourage people to view the Day House Farm Stone Circle and other historic sites before the landscape was significantly altered.
