= Town Gardens, Swindon =

Park and gardens in Swindon, England

Town Gardens
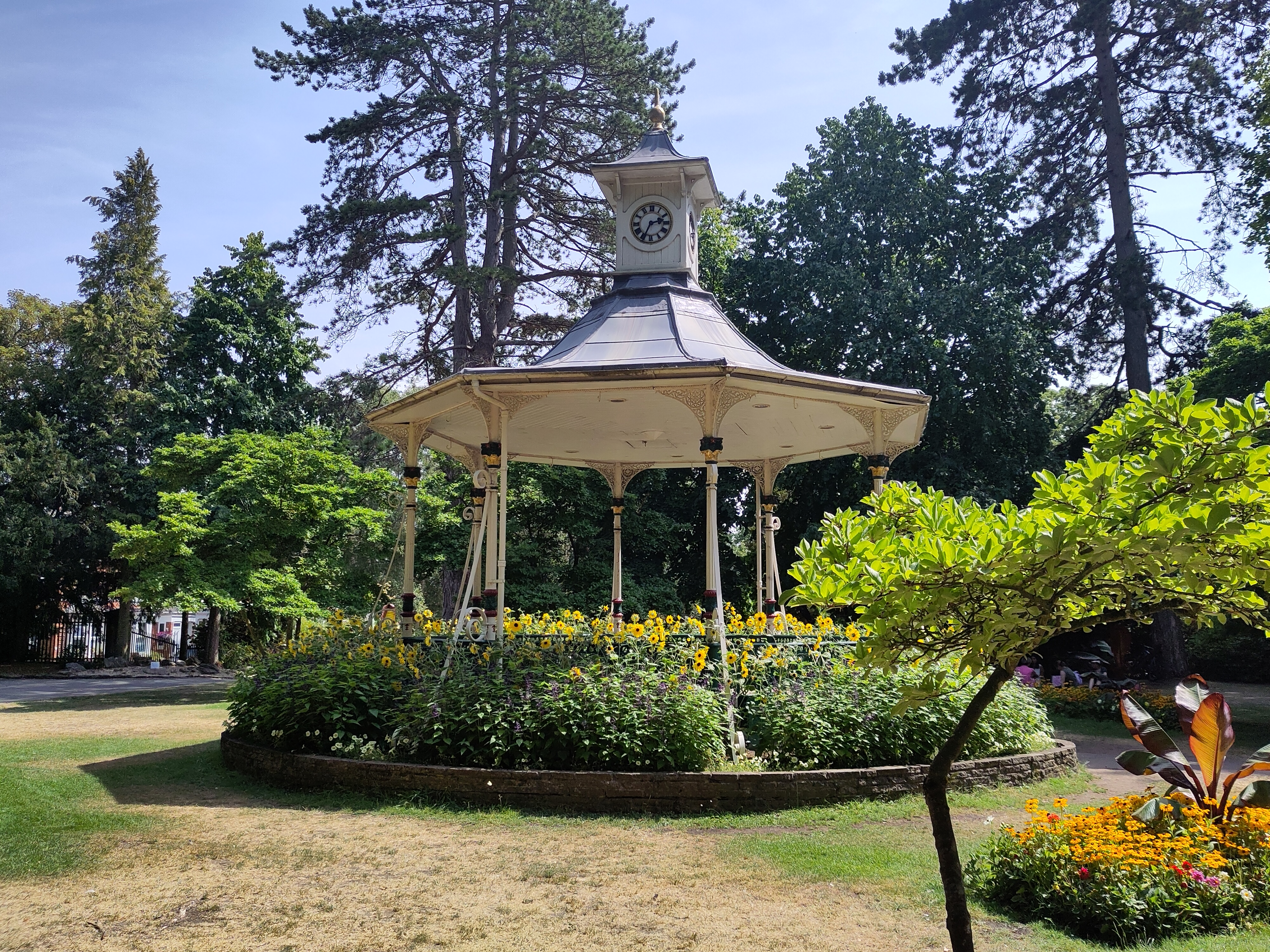
- The Town Gardens bandstand, July 2026

- Shown in Wiltshire
- 51°32′58.41″N 1°46′54.22″W
- Location: Swindon, Wiltshire, England

History
- Built: 1894

Site notes
- Area: Old Town
- Architect: Mr W H Read
- Website: https://towngardens-swindon.co.uk/

Listed Building – Grade II
- Designated: 24 October 2000
- Reference no.: 1001477

The Town Gardens is a public park and gardens in Old Town, Swindon, England. The park and several of its structures are Grade II listed.

The park is owned by Swindon Borough Council. In 2018 the park was transferred to South Swindon Parish Council on a 99-year lease, and the parish is now responsible for operating and maintaining the park.

== History ==
The park is located on the site of former Purbeck stone quarries which formed part of the Goddard family estates.

The oldest part of the park was laid out by Swindon Urban District Council on the southern part of the site, and opened to the public in 1894. This part of the park included an octagonal bandstand which remains in place today.

The park was extended to the northern part of the site in 1902.

The Art Deco concert bowl was built in the northern part of the park in 1936.

A former Great Western Railway kiosk was relocated to the park, near the Victorian bandstand, for use as a refreshments stand.

== Features ==
The park continues to be planted as a formal garden. At the southern part of the park an open lawn area features annual flowerbeds, and this planting extends north around the Victorian bandstand and through sunken gardens towards the concert bowl. A walled rose garden is in the central part of the park.

The southern lawn features a number of mature cherry trees. A Blossom Festival has been held annually since 2021. In 2024, the Town Gardens was named the most popular destination in the UK for cherry blossom by LateRooms.com.

The Victorian bandstand is used for brass bands and other concerts throughout the summer. The Art Deco bowl is used for larger concerts and other events such as theatre, outdoor cinema, and comedy.

The former GWR kiosk near the bandstand is operated by the Town Gardens Cafe.

A bowling green and clubhouse, home to the Town Gardens Bowls Club, is in the north western part of the park.
