= South Swindon =

Civil parish in Wiltshire, England

Coordinates: 51.56°N 1.77°W

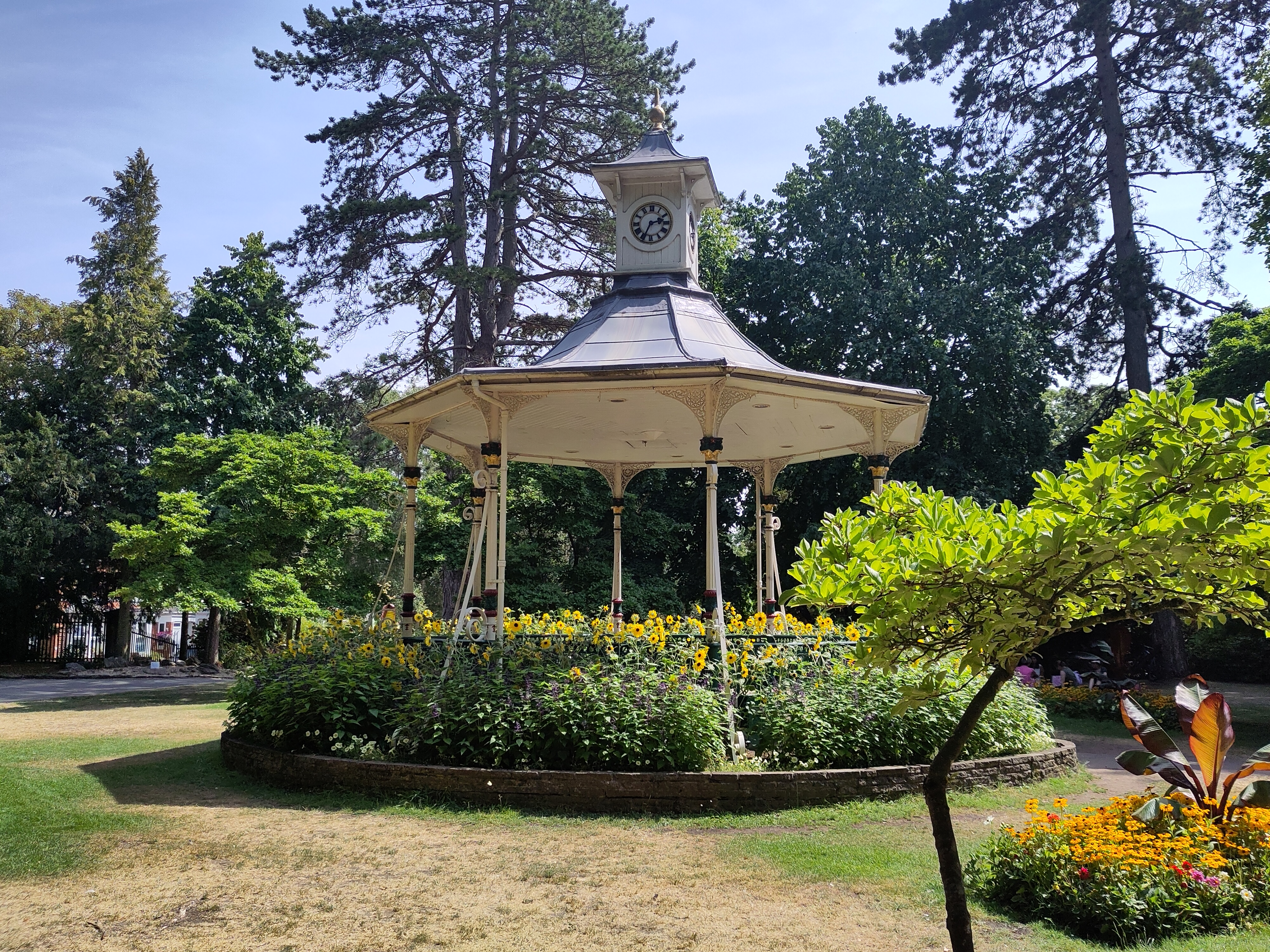
- The Bandstand at the Town Gardens

- Location within Wiltshire
- Area: 16.04 km^{2} (6.19 sq mi)
- Population: 62,871 (2021 census)
  - Density: 3,920/km^{2} (10,200/sq mi)
- OS grid reference: SU154851
- Civil parish: South Swindon
- Unitary authority: Swindon
- Ceremonial county: Wiltshire
- Region: South West
- Country: England
- Sovereign state: United Kingdom
- Places: List: Badbury Park, Eastcott, Lawn, Old Town and Old Walcot
- Post town: Swindon
- Postcode district: SN1
- Dialling code: 01793
- Police: Wiltshire
- Fire: Dorset and Wiltshire
- Ambulance: South Western
- UK Parliament: Swindon South
- Website: Parish Council

South Swindon, previously called Central Swindon South, is a civil parish in the town of Swindon, in the ceremonial county of Wiltshire, England. The parish covers the southern part of the central area of the town, including the Old Town area, and extends south to take in Wichelstowe and Coate Water. In 2021 it had a population of 62,871.

South Swindon is the largest civil parish in the Borough of Swindon by population, and the seventh largest civil parish by population in England. The parish borders Central Swindon North, Chiseldon, Liddington, Nythe, Eldene and Liden, Stratton St Margaret, West Swindon and Wroughton.

== History and governance ==
Prior to 2017, the areas which now form part of South Swindon were part of Swindon's non-parished area. Following a Community Governance Review in 2017, four new parishes were created on 1 April, covering all of Swindon's non-parished area. The parish was formed from parts of the unparished area of Swindon and the parish of Chiseldon.

The parish was created with the official name of Central Swindon South. Representatives of the new parish unsuccessfully petitioned Swindon Borough Council to change the name to South Swindon in November 2017. Despite refusal of this request, the parish chose to use "South Swindon Parish Council" as a trading name. Following a renewed request in October 2023, Swindon Borough Council consented to formally change the name of the parish to South Swindon. The change happened on 1 April 2024.

The parish elects 23 councillors at elections held every four years. All elections to date have been contested on a party-political basis, and at the elections held in May 2023 all elected councillors stood for the Labour Party.

The parish offices and council chamber are in the Broadgreen Community Centre in the town centre.

== Geography ==
The north-western boundary of South Swindon is formed by the Great Western Main Line, while the southern boundary is primarily the M4 motorway. The eastern boundary with Nythe, Eldene and Liden parish largely follows the Dorcan Stream (a small tributary of the River Cole).

The parish includes neighbourhoods and communities with distinct identities. These include Walcot, Park North and Park South, Badbury Park, Lawn, Coate, Old Town, and Swindon's urban centre. The East Wichel area of Wichelstowe is within the parish, while Mid Wichel and West Wichel are part of Wroughton parish.

== Amenities ==
South Swindon covers Swindon's Town Centre area, which includes the town's main shopping district, as well as Swindon's Old Town which has further retail and leisure. All of Swindon's commercial theatre venues are in the parish (Wyvern Theatre, Swindon Arts Centre and MECA), as well as one of the town's three multiplex cinemas. South Swindon Parish Council delivers an events service which operates year round across the parish, although the main focus is events in the Town Gardens in Swindon's Old Town. These events include a season of music and theatre at the Town Gardens Bowl, and the Enchanted Gardens Light Trail, which operates throughout December.

Swindon railway station is in the parish, as is Swindon's main bus interchange at Fleming Way.

South Swindon parish has direct responsibility for maintaining several of Swindon's most prominent parks, including Queen's Park, the Town Gardens in Old Town, and GWR Park in the town's historic Railway Village. The parish is also home to Coate Water Country Park, which is maintained by Swindon Borough Council. The former farmhouse at Coate, where the nature writer Richard Jefferies was born in 1848, is operated as a museum by a small charity.

South Swindon Parish Council operates two public libraries which are integrated with the Swindon Borough Library Service. Old Town Library was transferred to the parish from Swindon Borough Council in 2017. Badbury Park Library was opened in 2023. Swindon Borough Council directly operates two further libraries in the parish; Central Library in the Town Centre, and Park Library at Cavendish Square.

The parish directly operates community centres in Badbury Park and at Broadgreen in Swindon Central. Other community centres in the parish are operated by voluntary or community groups or by other organisations.
