= Hodson, Wiltshire =

Hamlet in Wiltshire, England

Coordinates: 51.522°N 1.751°W

Hodson
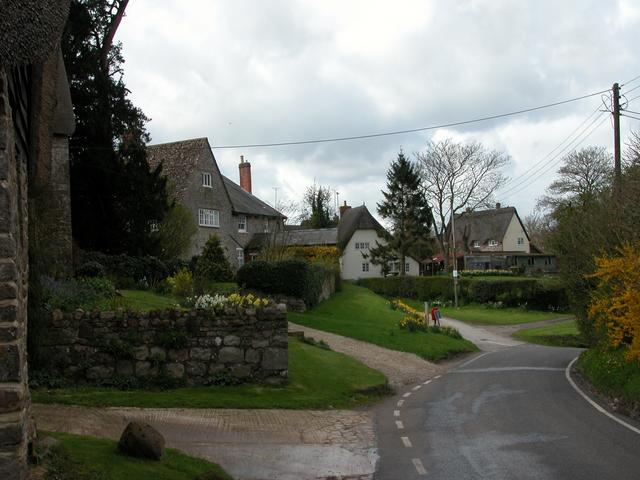
- The centre of Hodson

- Location within Wiltshire
- OS grid reference: SU174804
- Civil parish: Chiseldon
- Unitary authority: Swindon
- Ceremonial county: Wiltshire
- Region: South West
- Country: England
- Sovereign state: United Kingdom
- Post town: Swindon
- Postcode district: SN4
- Dialling code: 01793
- Police: Wiltshire
- Fire: Dorset and Wiltshire
- Ambulance: South Western
- UK Parliament: East Wiltshire
- Website: Chiseldon Parish Council

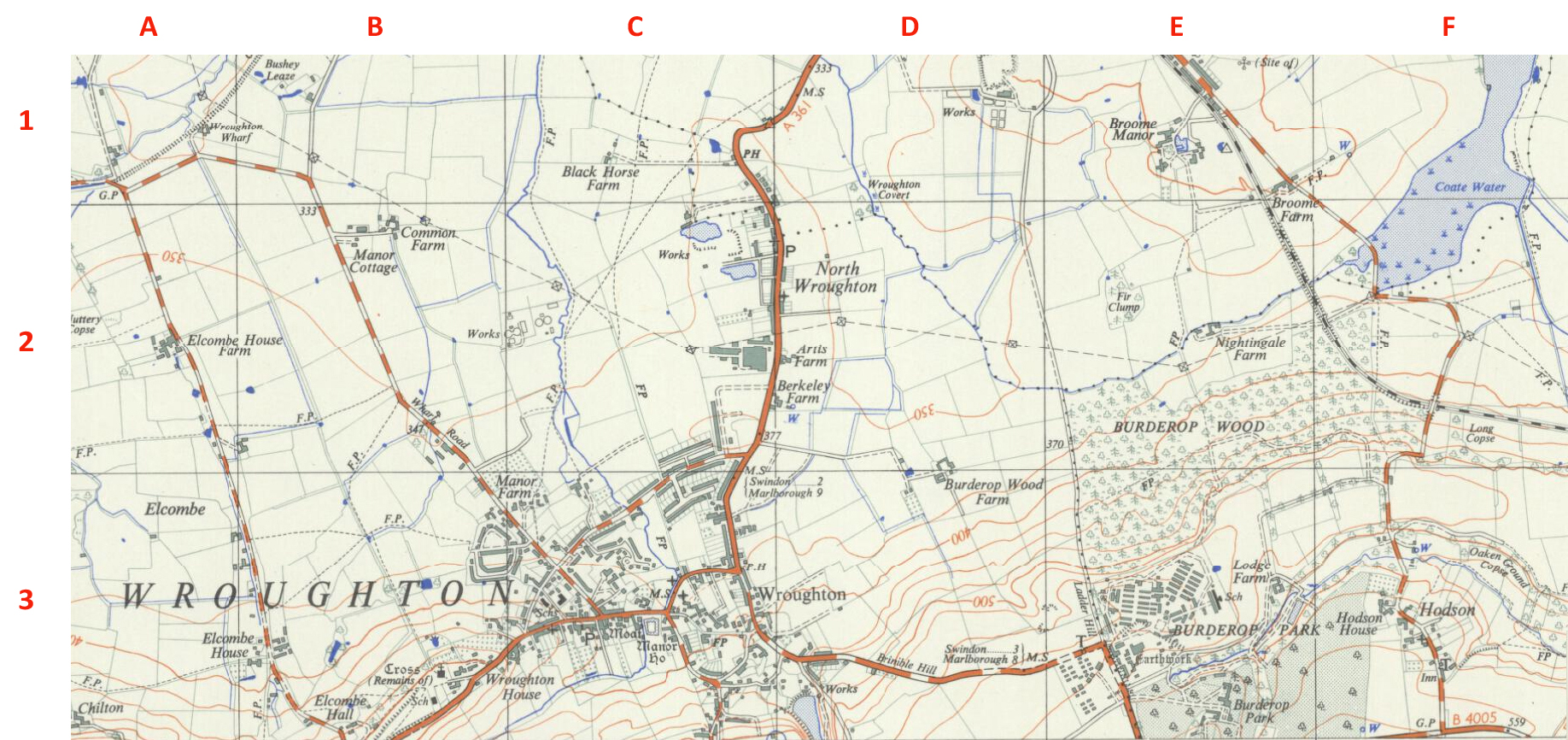
Ordnance Survey map from 1959 showing Wroughton (C3), Burderop Park (E3) and Hodson. Grid squares are 1km.

Hodson is a hamlet in a small valley, in the parish of Chiseldon, Wiltshire, England. The hamlet lies about half a mile northwest of the edge of Chiseldon village; the M4 motorway runs a similar distance to the north, and the centre of the large town of Swindon is some 3 miles (5 km) to the northwest.

By the 13th century, Hodson was part of Chiseldon manor.

North of the hamlet is Burderop Wood, c.120 acres (49 ha), designated a Biological Site of Special Scientific Interest in 1971 due to the wet ash-maple and acid pedunculate oak-hazel-ash woodland.

Part of the Swindon, Marlborough and Andover Railway ran close to the north part of the hamlet (grid squares E2–F2 in the image). The line was no longer used after March 1964, and part of its route through Burderop Wood was used for the M4 motorway west of junction 15 in the 1970s.

Hodson has a public house, the Calley Arms.

== See also ==
- Hodson Stone Circle
