= Broome Stone Circle =

Neolithic stone circle in Wiltshire, England

Broome Stone Circle was a stone circle located in the south-western English county of Wiltshire. The ring was part of a tradition of stone circle construction that spread throughout much of Britain, Ireland, and Brittany during the Late Neolithic and Early Bronze Age, over a period between 3300 and 900 BCE. The purpose of such monuments is unknown, although archaeologists speculate that the stones represented supernatural entities for the circle's builders.

The monument was visited and recorded by antiquarians like John Aubrey. In the mid-nineteenth century the stones were broken up for use as road metal. Nothing of the monument remains.

== Location ==
The Broome Stone Circle was a mile north of the Fir Clump Stone Circle.

== Context ==
While the transition from the Early Neolithic to the Late Neolithic in the fourth and third millennia BCE saw much economic and technological continuity, there was a considerable change in the style of monuments erected, particularly in what is now southern and eastern England. By 3000 BCE, the long barrows, causewayed enclosures, and cursuses which had predominated in the Early Neolithic were no longer built, and had been replaced by circular monuments of various kinds. These include earthen henges, timber circles, and stone circles. Stone circles are found in most areas of Britain where stone is available, with the exception of the island's south-eastern corner. They are most densely concentrated in south-western Britain and on the north-eastern horn of Scotland, near Aberdeen. The tradition of their construction may have lasted for 2,400 years, from 3300 to 900 BCE, with the major phase of building taking place between 3000 and 1,300 BCE.

These stone circles typically show very little evidence of human visitation during the period immediately following their creation. This suggests that they were not sites used for rituals that left archaeologically visible evidence, but may have been deliberately left as "silent and empty monuments". The archaeologist Mike Parker Pearson suggests that in Neolithic Britain, stone was associated with the dead, and wood with the living. Other archaeologists have suggested that the stone might not represent ancestors, but rather other supernatural entities, such as deities.

In the area of modern Wiltshire, various stone circles were erected, the best known of which are Avebury and Stonehenge. All of the other examples are ruined, and in some cases have been destroyed. As noted by the archaeologist Aubrey Burl, these examples have left behind "only frustrating descriptions and vague positions". Most of the known Wiltshire examples were erected on low-lying positions in the landscape.

== Later history ==
The antiquarian John Aubrey visited the site and described "a great stone 10 foot high (or better) standing upright, which I take to be the Remainder of these kind of Temples… in the ground below are many thus o o o o o in a right line". The stone circle was destroyed in the mid-nineteenth century. At this point, somebody purchased the Longstone, had it broken up, and used the rubble for street metalling in Cricklade, 8 miles to the north-west.
