= Coate Water Country Park =

Country park in Wiltshire, England

Coordinates: 51.543°N 1.746°W

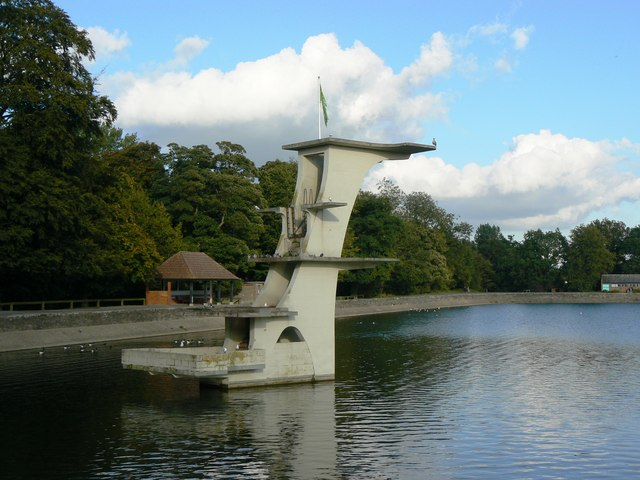
Art Deco diving platforms, Coate Water Country Park

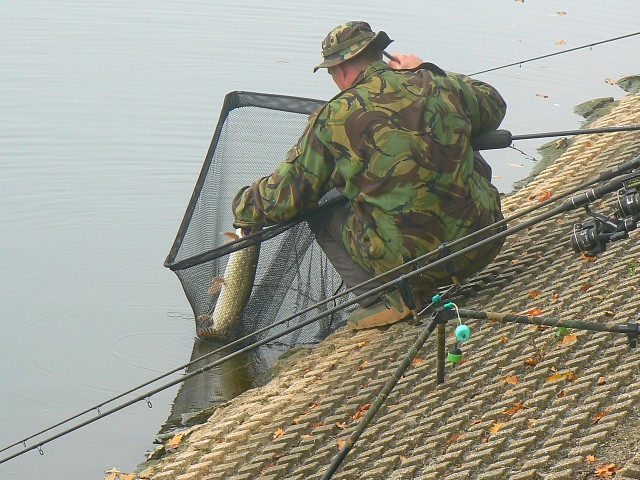
The fisherman has just landed a pike and is about to extract the hook

Coate Water (grid reference SU177827) is a country park situated 5 km (3.1 mi) to the southeast of central Swindon, England, near junction 15 of the M4. It takes its name from its main feature, a reservoir originally built to provide water for the Wilts & Berks Canal. Now named 'Coate Water Country Park', the lake and its surroundings are both a leisure facility and a nature reserve.

== History ==
The reservoir formed a 70-acre (280,000 m^{2}) lake, built in 1822 by diverting the River Cole. Its primary purpose was to provide water for the canal and it remained outside the borough of Swindon until the borough's expansion in 1928. In 1914, with the canal abandoned, Coate became a pleasure park; changing rooms and a wooden diving board were added.

In 1935 the diving board was replaced with a 33 ft (10 m) high concrete multi-level structure in an Art Deco style which has been praised by English Heritage, and is still in place although swimming in the lake has been prohibited since 1958. The structure was given Grade II listed protection in 2013. Restoration by Swindon Borough Council in 2022, at a cost of around £100,000, included reinstatement of the handrails.

=== Development plans ===
In 2004, Swindon Borough Council and the University of Bath published plans to develop land next to the park as a campus, but the university later withdrew the proposals. Since then Persimmon Homes and Redrow Homes have submitted various planning applications. One was turned down and dismissed at a planning appeal. Another proposal for 900 houses and an industrial estate went to appeal in November 2011 and was allowed by the Secretary of State. Local residents began a Save Coate campaign, which drew attention to archaeological features and pointed out that development conflicted with several of Swindon Borough Council's environmental policies.

A buffer zone around the park was proposed in late 2006, although campaigners and local residents did not think this was enough. In a newspaper poll, 20 per cent of readers said they believed that the new plans would help to protect Coate Water. The issue was further compounded when Coate Water was voted "Swindon's Favourite Place" by the local population.

== Archaeology ==
The area has Mesolithic, Neolithic, Bronze Age, Iron Age, Romano-British and Medieval history that spans a period of 7000 years or more.

The oldest known ancient monuments nearby are the scheduled Day House Lane stone circle and the Bronze Age burial mounds along the lane, one of which is also scheduled. Further Middle Bronze Age cremations, a possible pond barrow, and two large ring ditches have been found on the opposite side of the small Day Brook valley. A large, regionally significant Mesolithic flint scatter, with some topologically late artifacts, is also present c.150m south west of Coate Stone Circle. Six stone circles were recorded in the 18th/19th and early 20th centuries, all in the Coate area, and possibly linked, at least in part, by avenues of large sarsen stones. The remains of one of the stone circles probably still lies at the bottom of Coate Water.

Other relevant archaeology listed on the Wiltshire and Swindon Historic Environment Records includes the Coate Mound, excavated with very little record in the earlier 20th century, which is spatially associated with the Mesolithic artifact scatter. Other ancient finds and sites occur in the area south to Badbury Wick, and across the Day Brook valley, in later periods. This includes obscure Neolithic activity, Middle Bronze Age farming, a Mid-late Bronze Age enclosed settlement at Badbury Wick, unenclosed Middle Iron Age buildings, a small Roman settlement, and a deserted medieval village.

== Ecology ==
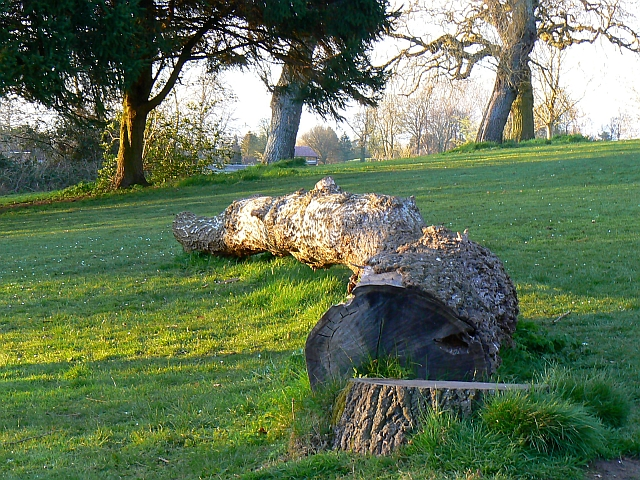
A dead tree has been felled and left for nature to take its course and for it to be colonised by saprophytes

An area of 51.1 hectares of the lake and its margins has been notified as a biological Site of Special Scientific Interest, mainly for its breeding bird populations. Part of the site is also a local nature reserve.

Coate Water is a notable site for birds. The following rare-in-Wiltshire species have been recorded there:

- Bearded tit – a pair in October 1982
- Black-crowned night heron – adults in April 1978 and May 1990
- Black-throated diver – a non-breeding plumaged adult in February 1978
- Black swan - one in February 2018
- Eurasian spoonbill – two adults in April 1978
- European shag – one in September 1993
- Grey phalarope – two juveniles in October 1987
- Little auk – one in January 1984
- Northern fulmar – one in June 1978
- Purple heron – a first-summer bird in May 1981
- Red-necked grebe – an adult in March/April 1995
- Red-throated diver – a juvenile in March 1979
- Ring-necked duck – a first-winter male in January 1998
- Rock pipit – one in March 1976
- Slavonian grebe – one in January 1982
- Warblers
  - Barred warbler – one in September 1980
  - Savi's warbler – one in May 1965
  - Yellow-browed warbler – one in September 1988

== Activities ==
Organisations based at the lake include Swindon Rowing Club and Coate Water Sailing Trust.

The North Wilts Model Engineering Society have a miniature railway, with about one mile of track of 5 in (127 mm) and 7 1/4 in (184 mm) gauge.

== In fiction ==
Author Richard Jefferies (1848–1887) was born at Coate village, a short distance northeast of Coate Water in Chiseldon parish; his home is now a museum. The "New Sea" in his Bevis books was based on Coate Water.

== Bibliography ==
- Wiltshire Ornithological Society (2007) Birds of Wiltshire ISBN 978-0-9555270-0-5
