= Bishopstone, Swindon =

Village in Wiltshire, England

Coordinates: 51.551°N 1.647°W

Bishopstone
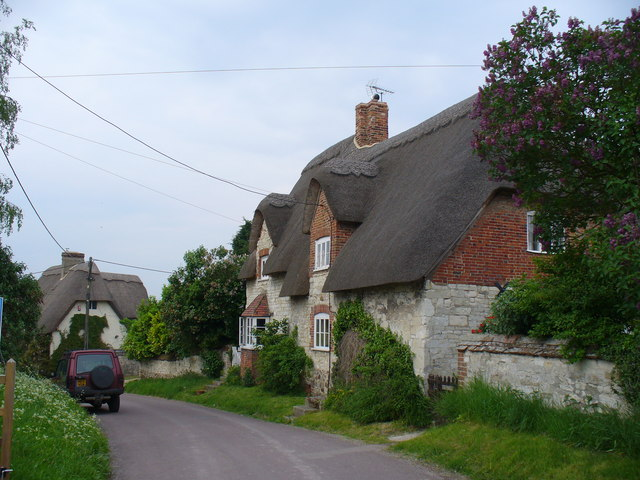
- High Street, Bishopstone

- Location within Wiltshire
- Population: 678 (in 2021)
- OS grid reference: SU246836
- Civil parish: Bishopstone
- Unitary authority: Swindon
- Ceremonial county: Wiltshire
- Region: South West
- Country: England
- Sovereign state: United Kingdom
- Post town: Swindon
- Postcode district: SN6
- Dialling code: 01793
- Police: Wiltshire
- Fire: Dorset and Wiltshire
- Ambulance: South Western
- UK Parliament: East Wiltshire
- Website: Parish Council

Bishopstone is a village and civil parish in the Borough of Swindon, Wiltshire, England. It is located about 6 miles (10 km) east of the centre of Swindon, and just west of the county border with Oxfordshire. Since 1934 the parish has included the village of Hinton Parva. Both Bishopstone and Hinton Parva have Grade I listed churches.

Bishopstone lies on the north slope of the Lambourn Downs, overlooking the Vale of White Horse. It is between Wanborough and Ashbury on the historic Icknield Way.

== Geography ==
Bishopstone lies at the western end of the Vale of White Horse. The parish was on the county boundary with Berkshire until 1974, when the Vale was transferred from Berkshire to Oxfordshire. The village retains the former millpond, and is characterised by ancient lanes which are narrow and winding.

The northern part of the parish is drained to the north-west by streams which join the River Cole, which forms part of the northern boundary of the parish. In the south, the land rises steeply to Charlbury Hill, Lammy Downs and Russley Downs. Russley Park, in the far south of the parish near Baydon, is a group of about 30 houses and equestrian facilities.

The parish is crossed from east to west by the Icknield Way, an ancient trackway; the minor road from Wanborough to Bishopstone follows a similar route. The village, most of it north of the road, developed around a spring-fed stream. For much of the 20th century the road was designated as part of the B4507, but this section – from the junction with the A419 in the west beyond Wanborough, to Ashbury in the east – is now unclassified. The land to the south of the road is within the North Wessex Downs Area of Outstanding Natural Beauty.

In the north, part of the parish is within the New Eastern Villages mixed use development area, an eastward expansion of Swindon which will include around 8,000 houses. The Swindon Borough Local Plan 2026, adopted in 2015, states that the character and identity of Bishopstone will be protected by a rural buffer.

== History ==
There was a complex of Roman buildings on Lammy Down, southeast of the village, near Starveall Farm. Iron Age pottery shards have been found on the site, which is inside a 4.5-hectare (11-acre) enclosure. Elsewhere on the north-facing slopes of the downs above Bishopstone are medieval field systems known as lynchets, described by Historic England as "in excellent condition and a good example of its type".

Bishopstone is not mentioned in the 1086 Domesday Book, when the area may have been part of the Bishop of Salisbury's Ramsbury estate. The name Bishopstone is first recorded in the early 13th century. The manor was held continuously (apart from a short period during the Civil War) by the bishops until it passed to the Ecclesiastical Commissioners in 1869; their successors the Church Commissioners held the land in 1980.

A National school was built next to the millpond in 1849, replacing an earlier cottage school. Around 70 children of all ages attended in 1859, and the building was enlarged in 1872. Numbers fell to 31 by 1980, but in 2023 had increased to 45.

As the number of farms in the parish decreased, the population fell by a third between 1881 and 1901.

Russley Park has a long association with racehorse training, being close to the Lambourn gallops. The Scottish ironmaster James Merry owned stables there from the 1850s, where his trainers included Mathew Dawson and James Waugh. During the First World War, premises at Russley Park were used as a remount depot where horses were prepared for officers; the depot was unusual in having an all-female workforce. Racehorse training continued until the 1980s, when Russley Park became a small residential development.

The parish was enlarged in 1934, when its western neighbour Hinton Parva (or Little Hinton) was added to it.

The whole of the village was designated as a Conservation Area in 1973.

== Parish church ==
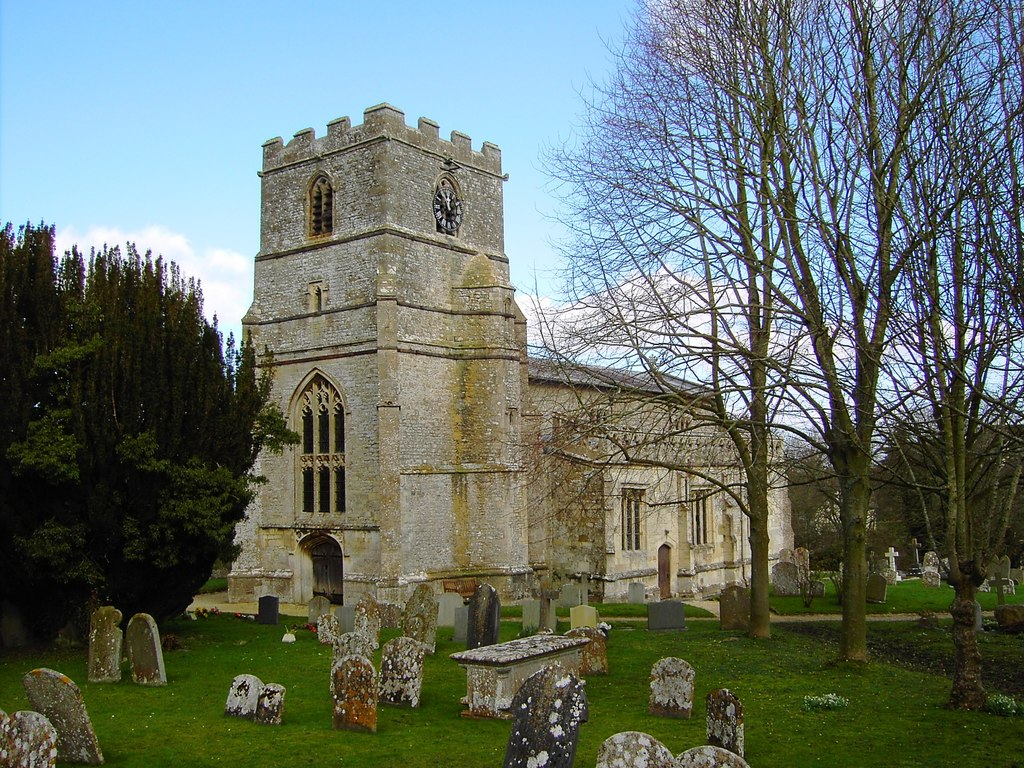
Parish church of St Mary the Virgin

There was a church at Bishopstone by the 12th century. The present St Mary's church is built of coursed sarsen with some ashlar and has a two-bay chancel, a three-bay nave with aisles and a west tower. In the north wall of the chancel is a small Norman doorway from the second half of the 12th century, called "extremely ornate" by Pevsner. Fragments of 12th-century carved heads are set into the wall above the south door. The north porch, added around the 14th century, leads into the aisle and re-uses a simple arch of c.1200. The east window of the south aisle has reticulated tracery of the early 14th century. The rest of the church is Perpendicular, although restored in 1868 and 1883, the latter by Ewan Christian. There was further work after a fire in 1891. The pierced parapet above the south aisle, and the arches of the arcades, are noted by Pevsner and Orbach to be similar to Highworth church. The church was designated as Grade I listed in 1955.

The tower has a lower stage with substantial buttresses, and two squat upper stages; Orbach writes that the tower "began with ambition". There is a clock on the south side. The eight bells were destroyed in the 1891 fire, and replaced by eight cast in the same year by Mears & Stainbank.

The font is late Norman but may have been partly recarved. The chancel has a marble tablet monument to Edith Willoughby (died 1670).

The benefice and parish were united with those of Hinton Parva in 1940; this became effective on the next vacancy, which occurred in 1946. Today, the church is within the area of a united benefice which also covers Lyddington and Wanborough.

Notable vicars include Whittington Landon from 1822 to 1826; he was provost of Worcester College, Oxford and later Vice-Chancellor of Oxford University and Dean of Exeter.

== Amenities ==
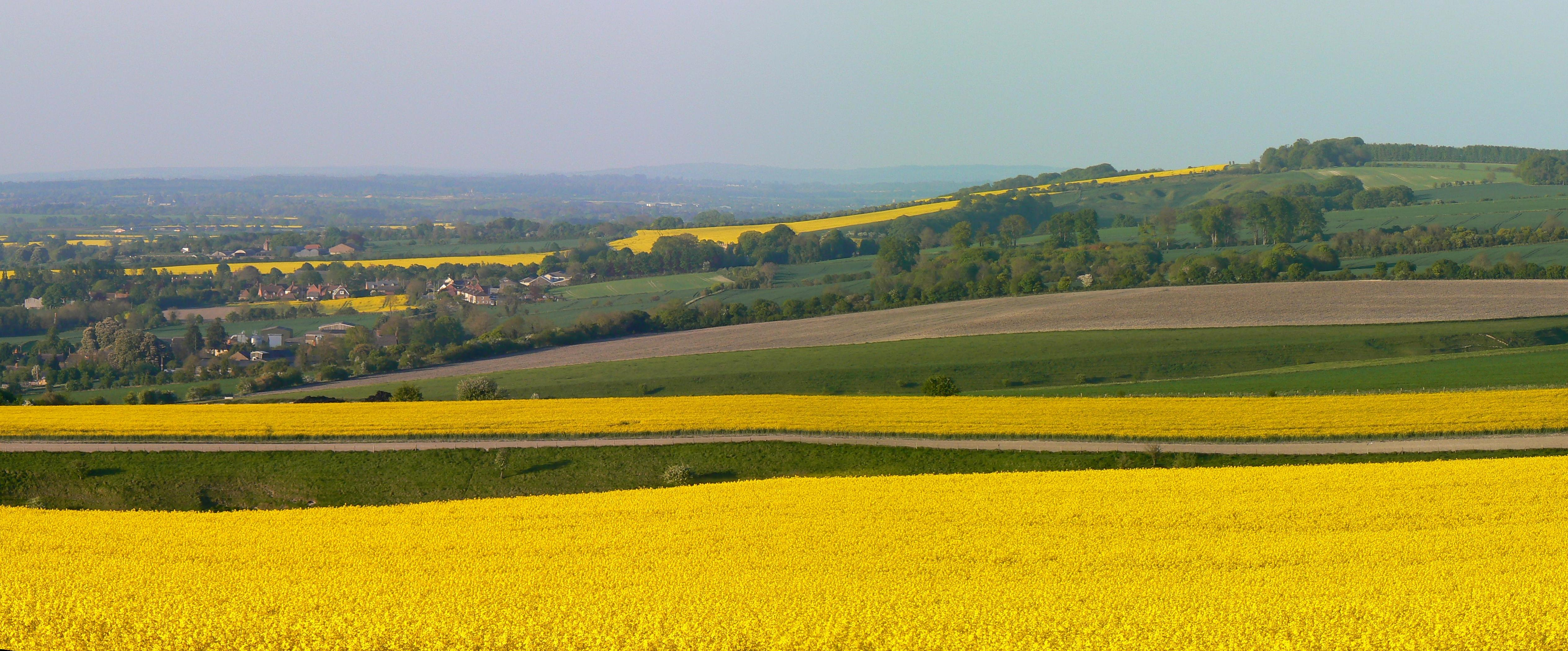
View east from Charlbury Hill

The village has a pub, the Royal Oak, and Bishopstone CE Primary School.

The village is often used as a base for walkers on the Ridgeway National Trail. The Ridgeway above Bishopstone is a byway open to motor vehicles between April and October. A path from the Ridgeway leads to Charlbury Hill, a viewing point.

== Notable people ==
- Alfred Edmonds (1821–1893), artist, draughtsman and cartographer.
- Helen Browning, a farmer in the parish, is a promoter of organic farming who has been CEO of the Soil Association charity since 2011.
