= Burderop Wood =

Woodland in Wiltshire, England

Coordinates: 51°31′43″N 01°45′35″W

Burderop Wood (grid reference SU165810) is a 48.5 hectare biological Site of Special Scientific Interest in Wiltshire, notified in 1971.

The site contains wet ash-maple and acid pedunculate oak-hazel-ash woodland, and its notification as an SSSI due to this, particular richness of the associated ground flora.

Ash is the most widespread tree in the wood, but many mature oaks also occur. Present in the wood's ground flora are the nationally scarce spiked star-of-Bethlehem (Ornithogalum pyrenaicum), and other species include herb-paris (Paris quadrifolia), broad-leaved helleborine (Epipactis helleborine), woodruff (Galium odoratum), wood anemone (Anemone nemorosa), sanicle (Sanicula europaea) and moschatel (Adoxa moschatellina).

== Sources ==
- Natural England citation sheet for the site (accessed 22 March 2022)
