= Hinton Parva, Wiltshire =

Village in Wiltshire, England

Coordinates: 51.547°N 1.667°W

Hinton Parva
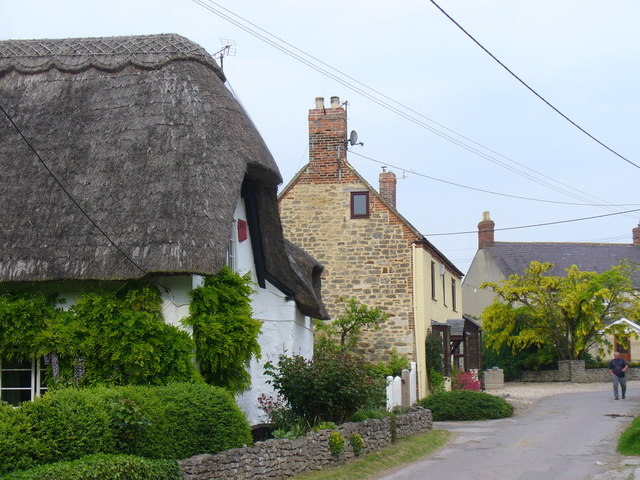

- Location within Wiltshire
- OS grid reference: SU232832
- Civil parish: Bishopstone
- Unitary authority: Swindon
- Ceremonial county: Wiltshire
- Region: South West
- Country: England
- Sovereign state: United Kingdom
- Post town: Swindon
- Postcode district: SN4
- Dialling code: 01793
- Police: Wiltshire
- Fire: Dorset and Wiltshire
- Ambulance: South Western
- UK Parliament: East Wiltshire
- Website: Parish

Hinton Parva, also known as Little Hinton, is a village in the Borough of Swindon, Wiltshire, England. It lies about 2 miles (3.2 km) from the eastern edge of the Swindon built-up area, and is separated from the town by farmland and the village of Wanborough. The village has a Grade I listed church which has Norman origins. Hinton Parva was a separate civil parish until 1934, and is now in the parish of Bishopstone.

== Geography ==
The parish is crossed from east to west by the Icknield Way, an ancient trackway; the minor road from Wanborough to Bishopstone follows a similar route. For much of the 20th century the road was designated as part of the B4507, but this section – from the junction with the A419 in the west beyond Wanborough, to Ashbury in the east – is now unclassified.

Hinton village is on the north side of the road, down a gentle slope. About 500m west, on a lane which loops north from the road, are houses and farms which in the past formed the hamlet of West Hinton. The land to the south of the road is within the North Wessex Downs Area of Outstanding Natural Beauty.

The area is drained to the north-west by streams which join the River Cole, and that river was the northern boundary of the parish.

== History ==
Hinton was anciently part of an estate held by the monks of the Old Minster, Winchester, which was centred nearby at Wanborough. The first records of Hinton as a separate parish are in the 12th century, and by the 13th the estate was separate from Wanborough. Hinton manor continued as the property of St Swithun's Priory, Winchester. After the Dissolution the estate passed to the Crown, but in 1541 it was granted to the new cathedral chapter at Winchester, who held it into the 19th century. The Ecclesiastical Commissioners took charge of the property in 1861 and sold most of the farms in the following decades; in 1976 they continued to own Little Hinton farm.

The parish was known as Little Hinton from at least the 15th century, perhaps to distinguish it from Broad Hinton. The equivalent Latin suffix "Parva" has been used since the 17th century.

The manor house, beyond the church in the north of the village, began as a small stonebuilt 17th-century farmhouse. Extended both to the east and upward in the mid 19th century and early 20th, partly in brick, the house is called "prettily irregular" by Julian Orbach.

The population of the parish peaked at 354 in 1851, then declined. The manor of Earlscourt, including Elm Court farm, was transferred to the parish from Wanborough in 1884. In 1934, the parish was abolished and merged into Bishopstone; the population at the 1931 census had been 208.

An area around the church was designated as a Conservation Area in 1990. In 2006, this area included two farms, around 30 dwellings, and some surrounding open space.

== Parish church ==
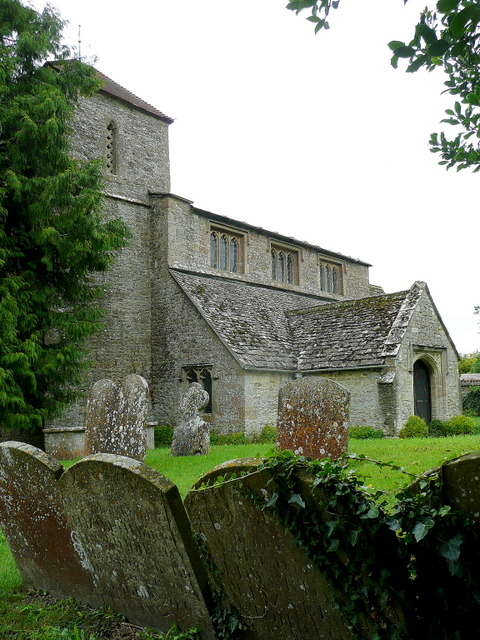
St Swithun's Church

St Swithun's church stands on the north side of the village and is called "small and attractive" by Julian Orbach. Built in rubble with ashlar dressings, it has a modest 13th-century west tower with pyramidal roof, a short nave with aisles, and a small chancel. The building was designated as Grade I listed in 1955.

The proportions of the nave suggest it may be Anglo-Saxon. The north arcade is from the early-to-mid 12th century, while the south arcade is from later in that century and has more detailed carving. The south door is also late Norman, inside a 16th-century porch. In the 15th or 16th century the clerestory was added and the nave roof was replaced. Restoration in 1860 included renewal of the chancel windows, retaining the original designs. Stained glass in the window above the altar, and two others, is by Kempe.

The 12th-century font has extensive carved decoration, described as lively and naïve. Writing in 1899, the diocesan architect C. E. Ponting understood the carving to have been re-cut. The oldest of the three bells was cast at Bristol, c.1500; the others are from the Aldbourne foundry, in 1698 and c.1730. The oak pulpit of 1637 was reassembled in 1905.

The dedication to Swithun was recorded in 1763; in the later 19th and early 20th centuries, an alternative dedication to St Anne was used.

The benefice and parish were united with those of Bishopstone in 1940, with the parsonage house at Hinton to be sold; this became effective on the next vacancy, which occurred in 1946. Today, the church is within the area of a united benefice which also covers Lyddington and Wanborough.

== Amenities ==
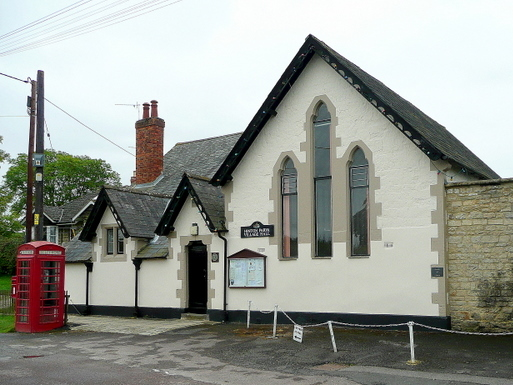
Hinton Parva village hall, the former village school

A cottage for use as a school was built in 1821, west of the village on the south side of the road. The building was later enlarged, and by 1871 it was a National School with 34 pupils of all ages. Numbers declined after the First World War and the school closed in 1927. The premises were then used as a community centre and are now the village hall. The Pendon Museum at Abingdon has a scale model of the school, chosen as representative of village schools in the Vale of White Horse.

The Coombes, a steep-sided dry valley south-west of the village, was designated in 1989 as a Site of Special Scientific Interest for its grasses and butterflies. It is owned and managed by the National Trust.

== Notable people ==
The jockey Richard Pitman and his wife Jenny bought a horse training yard (the stables of the former manor house) in 1968, which Jenny operated until 1976 as a place of recuperation for injured horses.
