= Badbury, Wiltshire =

Hamlet in Wiltshire, England

Coordinates: 51.524°N 1.720°W

Badbury
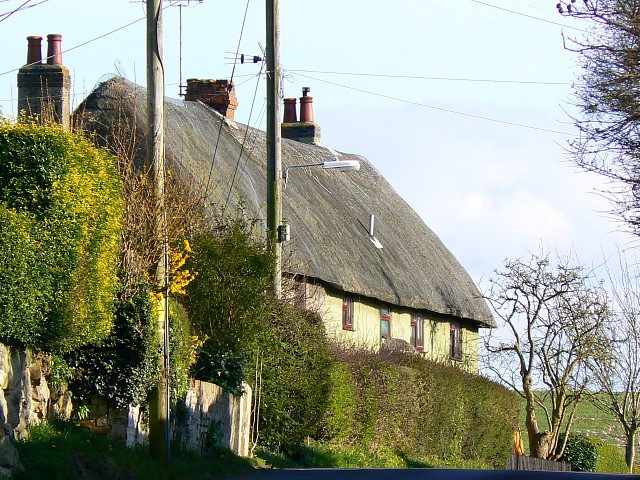
- Thatched cottages, Badbury

- Location within Wiltshire
- OS grid reference: SU196806
- Civil parish: Chiseldon
- Unitary authority: Borough of Swindon
- Ceremonial county: Wiltshire
- Region: South West
- Country: England
- Sovereign state: United Kingdom
- Post town: SWINDON
- Postcode district: SN4
- Dialling code: 01793
- Police: Wiltshire
- Fire: Dorset and Wiltshire
- Ambulance: South Western
- UK Parliament: East Wiltshire

Badbury is a hamlet in the Borough of Swindon, Wiltshire, England. It lies close to the M4 motorway, approximately 800 metres (0.50 mi) south-east of the edge of the Swindon urban area and 4 miles (6 km) from the centre of Swindon. The hamlet is within the civil parish of Chiseldon.

== History ==
There is evidence that in 955 King Eadred granted Badbury, then containing twenty-five hides, to Saint Dunstan, Abbot of Glastonbury Abbey. The manor of Badbury was held by the Abbey at the time of the Domesday Book, when it was counted as twenty hides. In 1203, Badbury was passed to the Bishop of Bath but it was returned to the monks of Glastonbury in 1219, where it remained until 1539.

In 1348 a group of villein tenants of the manor of Badbury led a revolt against their lord and unsuccessfully claimed that they should have the right to hold their land according to the customs of ancient demesne.

In 1543, the manor passed to William Essex and over the following two hundred years it passed to the Kibblewhite family, the Redferne family, the Norden family and the Mellish family before eventually being bought by the Stone family in 1718. The Stone family remained at the house until at least the late 20th century.

By 1773, most of the hamlet lay along a road from Liddington to Chiseldon. The population recorded at the 1841 census was 395.

== Conservation area ==
Badbury is at the centre of the Badbury Conservation Area, the boundaries of which are drawn to match the historical settlement, totalling about 30 residential homes. Historically, residents of the hamlet would have been farmers, but the hamlet is now centred around a pub, a care home and offices. There is no church, post office or school in the hamlet. In keeping with the historic feel of the village, the two modern buildings have been thatched and were designed to match the older buildings.
