= Withington railway station (Gloucestershire) =

Former railway station in Gloucestershire, England

Withington (Glos)
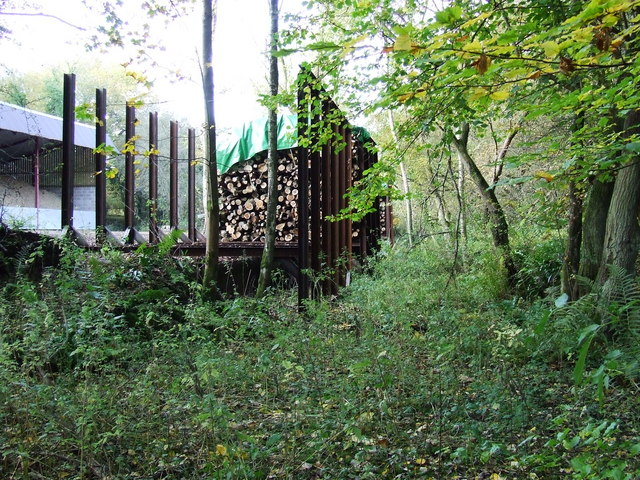

General information
- Location: Withington, Cotswold; England
- Coordinates: 51.8418°N 1.9554°W
- Grid reference: SP031159
- Platforms: 2

Other information
- Status: Disused

History
- Original company: Midland and South Western Junction Railway
- Pre-grouping: Midland and South Western Junction Railway
- Post-grouping: Great Western Railway

Key dates
- 1 August 1891: Opened as Withington
- 1 July 1924: Renamed Withington (Glos)
- 11 September 1961: Closed
Location

Withington railway station was on the Midland and South Western Junction Railway serving the village of Withington in Gloucestershire. The station opened to passengers on 1 August 1891 with the opening of the section of the line between Cirencester Watermoor and the junction at Andoversford with the Great Western Railway's Cheltenham Lansdown to Banbury line, which had opened in 1881.

The station was originally called just "Withington", but was renamed after the Grouping of 1923 allocated the M&SWJR to the GWR, which already had a Withington station at the village of the same name in Herefordshire. Its official name after 1924 was "Withington (Glos)".

The station was always lightly used and from 1956 staffing was withdrawn and it was downgraded to halt status. The line closed to all traffic in 1961 and the station buildings were demolished, though traces of one of the platforms remain. An enamel station sign for Withington station is at Winchcombe Railway Museum.

== Route ==
Preceding station	Disused railways	Following station
Andoversford and Dowdeswell	Midland and South Western Junction Railway; Swindon & Cheltenham Extension Railway	Chedworth Halt
