= Dowdeswell =

Civil parish in Gloucestershire, England

Coordinates: 51°52′52″N 2°00′12″W

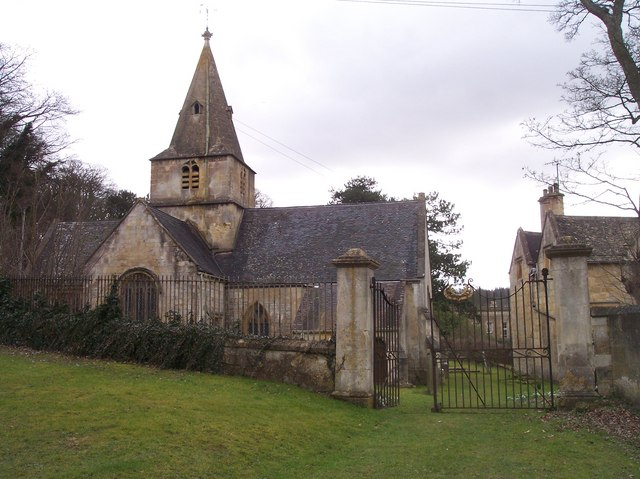
- The Church of Saint Michael and All Saints

- Location within Gloucestershire
- Population: 134 (2011 Census)
- Civil parish: Dowdeswell
- District: Cotswold
- Shire county: Gloucestershire
- Region: South West
- Country: England
- Sovereign state: United Kingdom
- Post town: Cheltenham
- Postcode district: GL54
- Police: Gloucestershire
- Fire: Gloucestershire
- Ambulance: South Western
- UK Parliament: North Cotswolds

Dowdeswell is a civil parish in the ward of Chedworth, Cotswold, in the ceremonial county of Gloucestershire, England. It is separated into Upper and Lower Dowdeswell, the former being south of the latter. The population of the civil parish at the 2011 census was 134.

About 7.1 km (4.4 mi) to the northwest is Cheltenham, and 19 km (12 mi) to the west is Gloucester. In 2001, it had a population of 185.

The Church of Saint Michael and All Saints is a Grade I listed building.

== Environment ==
Northwest of Lower Dowdeswell, there is Dowdeswell Woods. Immediately south of these woods is Dowdeswell Reservoir. Both are managed as nature reserves through the Gloucestershire Wildlife Trust (formerly named Gloucestershire Trust for Nature Conservation). On the opposite hillside to Dowdeswell Woods lies Lineover Wood which is a Site of Special Scientific Interest and is on the steep face of the Cotswold scarp. The Cotswold Way runs at the edge of Dowdeswell Woods, crosses the A40 and runs through Lineover Wood. The nature reserve of Arle Grove lies in the parish of Dowdeswell.

== Railways ==
In 1891, Dowdeswell was the name given to a station in the nearby village of Andoversford on the Midland and South Western Junction Railway; the name was to avoid confusion with Andoversford station on the Great Western Railway's Cheltenham to Banbury line. The name of Dowdeswell station was changed to Andoversford and Dowdeswell in 1892. The station closed to passengers in 1927 after the GWR had taken over the M&SWJR; however, it remained open for goods traffic until 1962.

== Bibliography ==
- Gloucestershire: the Cotswolds, David Verey, Pevsner Architectural Guides: The Buildings of England, Penguin, 1970, ISBN 0-14-071040-X. pp. 216–219.
- Gloucestershire Railway Stations, Mike Oakley, Dovecote Press, 2003, ISBN 1-904349-24-2
