= Foss Cross railway station =

Former railway station in Gloucestershire, England

Coordinates: 51.7868°N 1.9138°W

Foss Cross
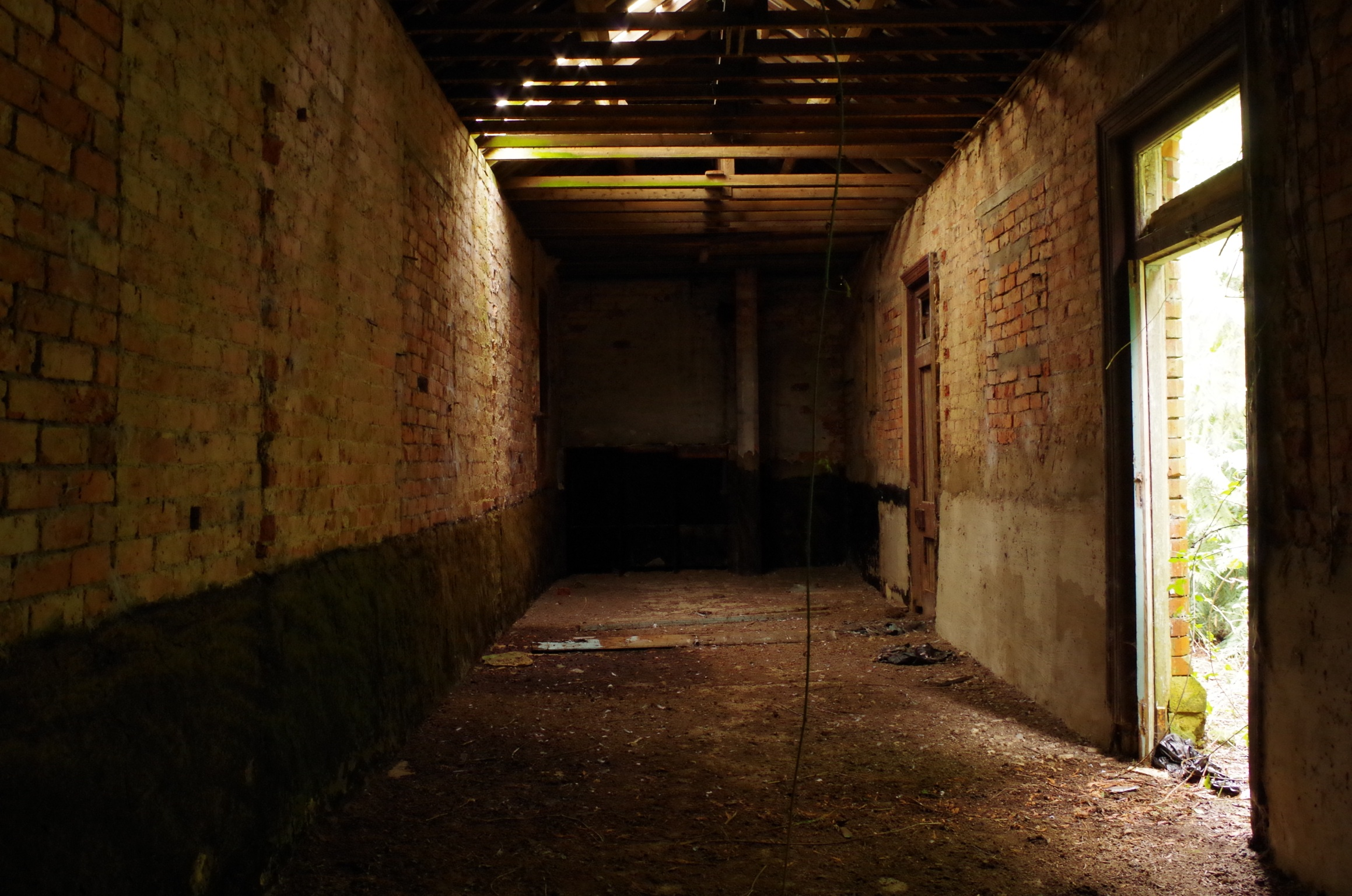
- Foss Cross platform building

General information
- Location: Chedworth, Cotswold; England
- Grid reference: SP060098
- Platforms: 2

Other information
- Status: Disused

History
- Original company: Midland and South Western Junction Railway
- Pre-grouping: Midland and South Western Junction Railway
- Post-grouping: Great Western Railway

Key dates
- 1 August 1891: Station opened
- 11 September 1961: Station closed
Location

Foss Cross railway station was on the Midland and South Western Junction Railway in Gloucestershire. The station opened on 1 August 1891 with the section of the line between Cirencester Watermoor and the junction at Andoversford with the Great Western Railway's Cheltenham Lansdown to Banbury line, which had opened in 1881.

Foss Cross was an isolated station, and the nearest village was Chedworth, over a mile away, and that petitioned successfully for its own station, which opened just a year later. Other villages such as Bibury were up to four miles away. The result was that the station was very lightly used for passenger traffic and towards the end of its life only one passenger a day used it regularly.

However, what it lacked in passengers it made up in goods traffic. The station handled much agricultural traffic until the 1930s and there was also a set of sidings leading to stone quarries. Some of the stone was used by the railway, and water from the large water tower at Cirencester Watermoor station was hauled regularly to Foss Cross sidings in rail-mounted tankers to supply the stone crushing equipment located there.

Foss Cross station closed to both passengers and goods when the line closed to all traffic in 1961. The main station building and part of one platform remained in 2013, along with a cattle dock, two huts and foundations of the goods shed. In 1929 a train consisting of 67 wagons with a weight of 475 tons conveyed the dismantled Rose Cottage from Chedworth from Foss Cross to Brentford on the first part of its journey to Michigan where it was rebuilt on the instructions of Henry Ford.

Today the platform remains along with two structures (see the picture of this article). The main building is very overgrown but you walk along the tree covered platform and enter via the middle door. Inside are some faded signs on the door and some men's urinals at the far end. The whole area is very overgrown but you can still see the station very clearly.

== Route ==
Preceding station	Disused railways	Following station
Chedworth Halt	Midland and South Western Junction Railway; Swindon & Cheltenham Extension Railway	Cirencester Watermoor
