= Lineover Wood =

Woodland in Gloucestershire, England

- Site of Special Scientific Interest
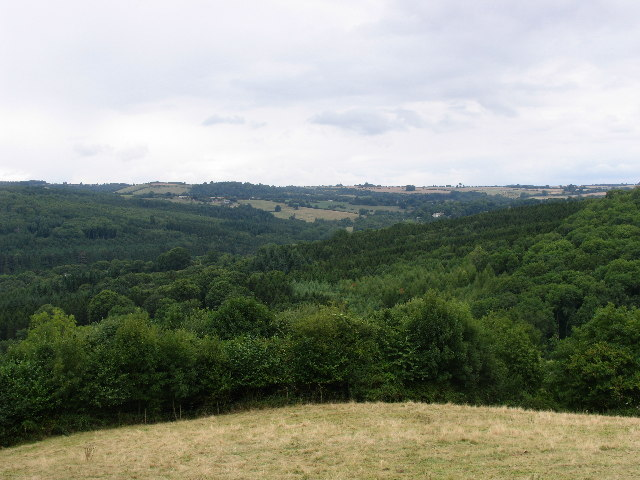
- Lineover Woods – Dowdeswell Woods beyond on the left

- Location within Gloucestershire
- Location of Lineover Wood.
- Area of search: Gloucestershire
- Grid reference: SO987187
- Coordinates: 51.867326°N 2.01956°W
- Interest: Biological
- Area: 20.3 ha (50 acres)
- Notification date: 1986

Lineover Wood (grid reference SO987187) is a 20.3-hectare (50-acre) biological Site of Special Scientific Interest in Gloucestershire, notified in 1986.

The site is owned and managed by the Woodland Trust, and is near the communities of Charlton Kings, Cheltenham and Dowdeswell. The Cotswold Way National Trail runs through the site, crossing the A40 from the opposite side of the valley where it runs along the edge of Dowdeswell Woods and below the dam of Dowdeswell Reservoir.

The site is listed in the 'Cotswold District' Local Plan 2001-2011 (on line) as a Key Wildlife Site (KWS).

== Location ==
The site is in the Cotswold Area of Outstanding Natural Beauty, is on the north-facing slope of the scarp and is steep. It overlies limestone of the Inferior Oolite and clays and sands of the Upper Lias layer. The designated site is part of a larger woodland area which has been replanted with conifers and broad-leaved species. There are seepage areas and a spring in the north of the site.

== Woodland ==
The wood is an example of the ancient semi-natural coppice woodland which was common in the Cotswolds. Species include ash, pedunculate oak, whitebeam, small-leaved lime and large-leaved lime (nationally rare). The understorey is hazel, field maple, hawthorn and there are lime-loving shrubs in particular areas.

== Flora ==
The steep slopes support bramble and dog's mercury. At the base of the slope, meadow saffron and herb paris can be found. There are recorded rare plants which include angular Solomon's seal and lily-of-the-valley.

== Fauna ==
The site is known for beetles including uncommon species. There are a wide variety of butterflies and moths recorded including the pearl-bordered fritillary.

== SSSI Source ==
- Natural England SSSI information on the citation
- Natural England SSSI information on the Lineover Wood units
