= Chedworth Halt railway station =

Former railway station in Gloucestershire, England

Chedworth Halt

General information
- Location: Chedworth, Cotswold; England
- Coordinates: 51.8012°N 1.9204°W
- Grid reference: SP055113
- Platforms: 2

Other information
- Status: Disused

History
- Original company: Midland and South Western Junction Railway
- Pre-grouping: Midland and South Western Junction Railway
- Post-grouping: Great Western Railway

Key dates
- 1 August 1891: Line opened
- 1 October 1892: Station opened
- 11 September 1961: Closed
Location

Chedworth Halt railway station was on the Midland and South Western Junction Railway in Gloucestershire. The station opened on 1 October 1892, 14 months after the opening of the section of the line between Cirencester Watermoor and the junction at Andoversford with the Great Western Railway's Cheltenham Lansdown to Banbury line, which had opened in 1881. Villagers at Chedworth had complained that the station provided at Foss Cross was inconvenient.

The original station was very small and used an old railway carriage on the single platform as the waiting shelter. It was relocated a little further north when the line was made double track in 1902. No goods facilities were provided. The Station Master's house adjacent to the very substantial but now demolished bridge over the centre of the village still has in its back garden the steps cut into the embankment via which he would go up onto the formation and walk to the station. The village pub has a good photo of him standing on the trackbed.

The station was always lightly used and from 1925 it was downgraded to halt status, with staffing entirely withdrawn in 1954. The line closed to all traffic in 1961 and the station buildings were demolished.

== Route ==
Preceding station	Disused railways	Following station
Withington (Glos)	Midland and South Western Junction Railway; Swindon & Cheltenham Extension Railway	Foss Cross
