= Charlton Kings =

Village in Gloucestershire, England

Coordinates: 51.8877°N 2.0413°W

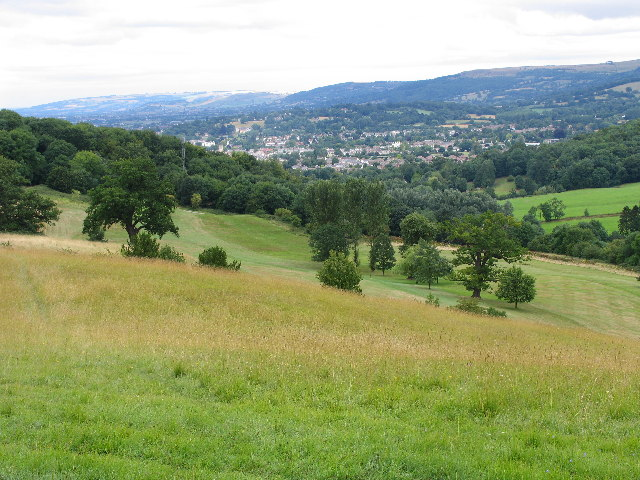
- A view from the lower slopes of Charlton Kings Common

- Location within Gloucestershire
- Population: 10,396 (2011)
- OS grid reference: SO9715221074
- District: Cheltenham
- Shire county: Gloucestershire
- Region: South West
- Country: England
- Sovereign state: United Kingdom
- Post town: CHELTENHAM
- Postcode district: GL53
- Dialling code: 01242
- Police: Gloucestershire
- Fire: Gloucestershire
- Ambulance: South Western
- UK Parliament: Cheltenham

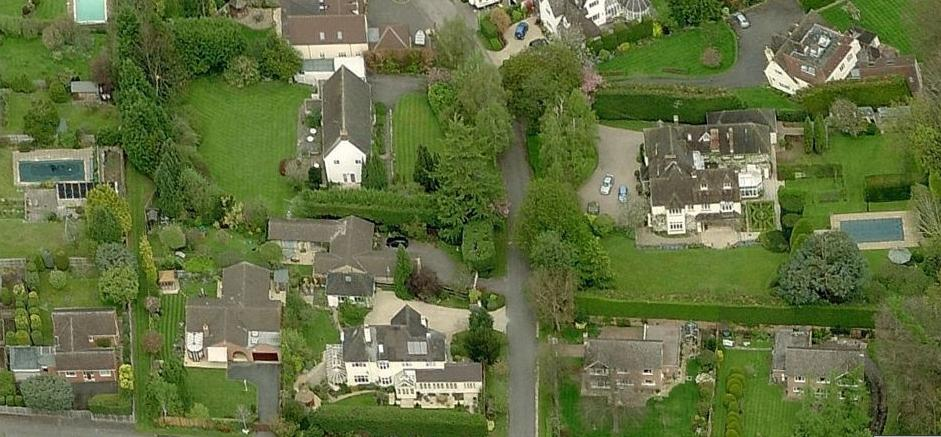
An aerial view of Charlton Kings from the south

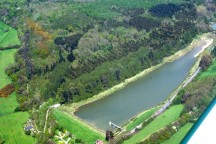
Dowdeswell Reservoir and Wood, Charlton Kings parish boundary is below dam embankment

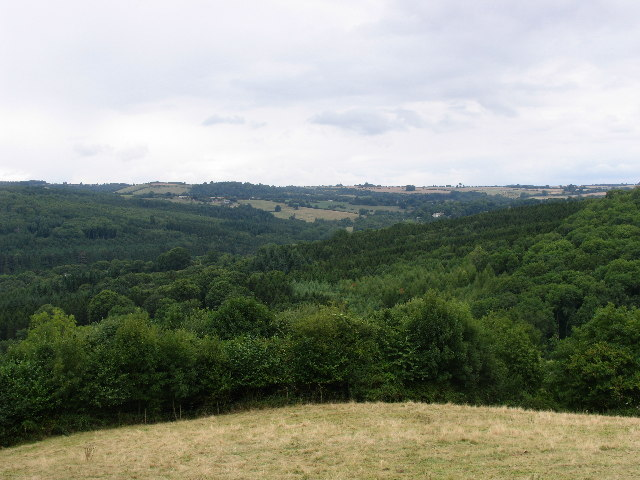
Lineover Wood on Charlton Kings parish boundary. Dowdeswell Woods over to the left

Charlton Kings is a contiguous village adjoining Cheltenham in Gloucestershire, England. The area constitutes a civil parish of 10,396 residents (2011).

== Landscape ==
Charlton Kings is situated in the west foothills of the north–south Cotswolds, which is an Area of Outstanding Natural Beauty. Its surroundings are protected by nature conservation legislation and designations. Lineover Wood SSSI is located on the Cotswold District side of the eastern boundary. Charlton Kings Common and Leckhampton Hill are also designated as SSSIs by Natural England.

The River Chelt enters the area from the east. The Cotswold Way National Trail is on Charlton Kings's eastern boundary and runs alongside Dowdeswell Reservoir and Woodland which is on the Cotswold District side of the eastern boundary.

== History ==
The place name comes from Anglo-Saxon times, the word "Charlton" evolved from the term ceorls' tun, a ceorl latterly rendered churl being the Saxon term for an independent peasant landowner and -tun (latterly rendered -ton) meaning an enclosure with a dwelling. This example was established as part of the royal manor and Hundred of Cheltenham, hence the term "Kings" in the name.

=== Early settlement ===
Evidence of settlement in Charlton Kings as early as the middle Iron Age was found underneath a Roman villa discovered in 1980. There are many other Roman settlements close by such as Chedworth, Whittington and notably a field called Wycomb (formerly Wickham), and the area of Charlton Kings is well suited to settlement due to the well-drained sand-and-gravel composition of the soil making early settlement much more likely. Much of early Charlton Kings was used for agriculture, tended to by small homesteads. This is evidenced by place names surviving until today. These small homesteads gave way to larger manor houses, for example, Charlton House which is now the headquarters of the engineering company Spirax Sarco and the Cheltenham Park Hotel which was previously called Lilleybrook House. There is evidence in local place names of the crops previously grown in Charlton Kings, such as Hempcroft (hemp), Flaxley (flax) and Crab End (crab apples). Other crops known to be grown in the area were cherries and grapes.

== Transport ==
Stagecoach West's buses link the village, neighbouring areas and Cheltenham. Main roads east to Oxford (A40) south to Bath (A46) and Cirencester (A417) south-east run through Charlton Kings, buses from Stagecoach and National Express also serve these destinations.

Former railway and trams

Plans for a railway were first drafted in 1872. The Charlton Kings section of the Banbury and Cheltenham Direct Railway line had a troublesome construction mainly due to the clay in the soil, progress was slow, and the line was opened in 1881 with a small station in Charlton Kings. From 1891 the line was also part of the Midland and South Western Junction Railway (M&SWJR) between Cheltenham and Swindon, a north–south route that went on through Swindon to Andover and the south coast ports. Between 1899 and 1914, the Charlton Kings line had frequent services to Cheltenham, Banbury and Swindon and major expresses to cities such as Manchester, Birmingham and Southampton. Traffic along the M&SWJR line greatly increased due to the transportation of men and munitions southwards during World War I and World War II. After the latter war, the line was used much less. The M&SWJR closed on 9 September 1961 and the Cheltenham to Banbury line closed on 15 October 1962, when the station at Charlton Kings finally shut. Electric trams operated by the Cheltenham and District Light Railway were also used in Charlton Kings between 1903 and 1930 when they were replaced by buses.

== Schools ==
- Charlton Kings Infants' School
- Charlton Kings Junior School
- Glenfall Community Primary School
- Holy Apostles C of E Primary School
- Balcarras School (Comprehensive)
- St Edward's Junior School (Independent)
- St Edward's School, Cheltenham (Independent)

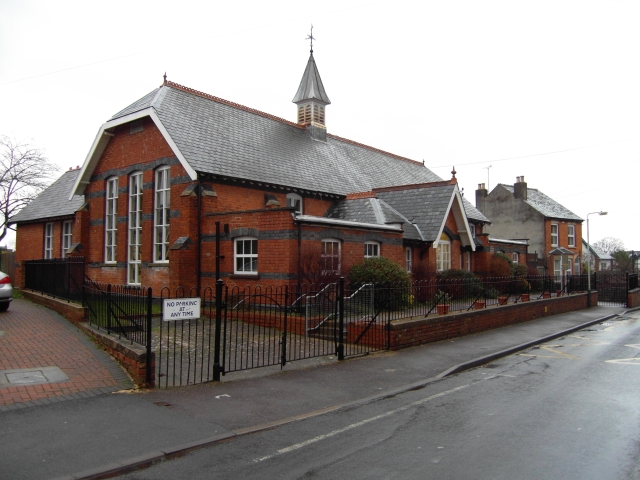
Charlton Kings Infant School

== Churches ==
- Charlton Kings Baptist Church
- Holy Apostles' Church (Church of England)
- Sacred Hearts of Jesus and Mary (Roman Catholic)
- St Mary's Church (Church of England)

Cheltenham Network Church (formerly Glenfall Church and Glenfall Fellowship) meets outside the Charlton Kings Parish since Easter 2012 (Church of England))

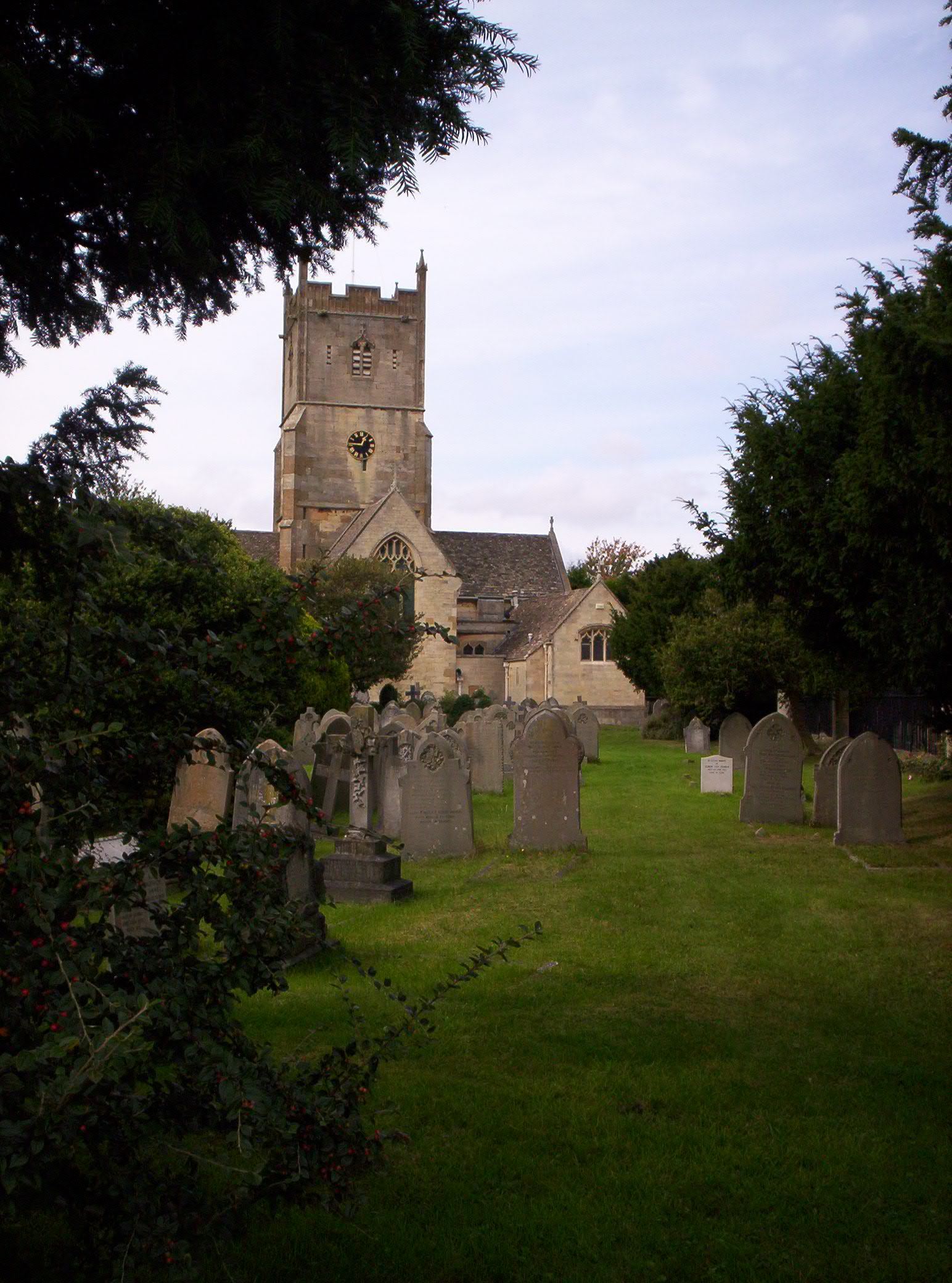
St Mary's church

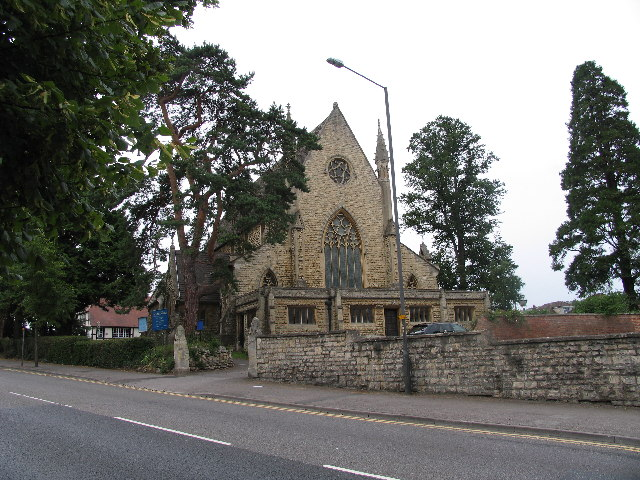
Holy Apostles' Church

=== St Mary's Church ===
St Mary's church, dedicated to Mary in 1190 by William de Vere, Bishop of Hereford, is the oldest church in Charlton Kings and was built to ease the mother Cheltenham parish.

It houses numerous historical artifacts, including an old alms chest used for collecting money to donate to the Third Crusade which may date back to 1190. The church also contains a stained glass window which was donated by Japanese naval officers to the church in 1907 in memory of Robert Podmore. St Mary's church houses one of the oldest royal arms in the country, it was acquired in 1660 to celebrate the restoration of Charles II and restored in 1988 to commemorate the 200th anniversary of George III's visit to Charlton Kings. Robert Burns's granddaughters, Sarah and Annie Burns and his great-granddaughter Margaret Constance Burns Hutchinson were all buried at St Mary's church between 1909 and 1925.

=== Holy Apostles Church ===
Holy Apostles Church is located in a triangular junction between the roads to London and Cirencester. This location for the church was contested early in its development as local people thought that if another church was to be built, it would be better to have it in a location where it could serve more isolated parishioners. The foundation stone of the church was laid in 1866. In 1970, during a storm, the church was struck by lightning and the roof and organ were destroyed by fire. They have since been replaced.

== Sports and recreation ==
Local community organisations include:

- 1st Charlton Kings Boys' Brigade
- 1st Charlton Kings Guide Company
- 7th Cheltenham (Charlton Kings) Scout Group
- 125 (Cheltenham) Squadron Air Training Corps
- Charlton Kings Choral Society
- Charlton Kings Local and Family History Society
- Charlton Kings Community Players
- Falcons AFC

== Community welfare ==
Charlton Kings has a developed Senior Citizens' support service, operated through the Charlton Kings Senior Citizens' Welfare Committee, which has its roots back to 1947.

== Local and national government ==
The place has a parish council. Charlton Kings is in the Charlton Kings ward of Cheltenham Borough Council, the Charlton Kings division of Gloucestershire County Council and the parliamentary constituency of Cheltenham. The Parish Council has a local Parish Plan which includes detail on its boundaries, urban and countryside areas, its responsibilities, its community profiles and action plan. It consults within the community.

== Literary link ==
A house in Cudnall Street has a particular literary connection. Its mirror inspired author Lewis Carroll to write the story Through the Looking-Glass.

== Famous people with a connection to Charlton Kings ==
- Sydney Dobell, a poet moved to Charlton Kings (lived in Coxhorne House) in 1840 and regarded Charlton Kings as "home above any other place".
- Cecil Day-Lewis, Poet Laureate lived in Charlton Kings (Box Cottage, Bafford Lane) between 1931 and 1938, and taught at Cheltenham College.
- Adam Lindsay Gordon, a leading Australian poet, was baptised at St Mary's Church, Charlton Kings, in 1833.
- Jaz Coleman, composer and lead singer of Killing Joke, was born and raised in Charlton Kings.
- Piers Coleman, physicist, was born and raised in Charlton Kings.
- Gilbert Biberian, a renowned classical guitarist and composer, resided in Charlton Kings.
- Alice Liddell and Lewis Carroll were regular visitors to a house in Cudnall Street, Charlton Kings. This house was owned by Alice Liddell's grandparents, and the mirror is reported to be in existence which inspired Lewis Carroll to write the story Through the Looking-Glass.
- Mary Watson, one of the first two women to study chemistry at the University of Oxford, resided here between marriage in 1882 and 1906.

== Bibliography ==
- F. B. Welch "The Manor of Charlton Kings, later Ashley" Transactions of the Bristol & Gloucestershire Archaeological Society, vol. 54, 1932, pp.145–165
