= Withington, Gloucestershire =

Village and civil parish in Gloucestershire, England

Coordinates: 51°50′20″N 1°57′30″W

Withington
- Village, civil parish
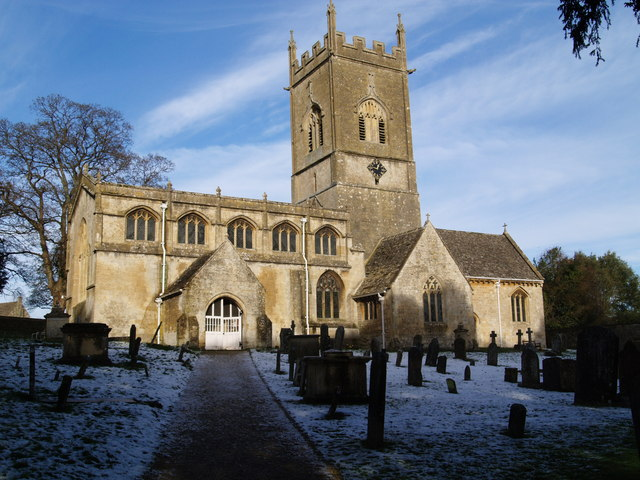
- Church of St Michael, Withington
- Population: 510 (2021 census)
- District: Cotswold
- Shire county: Gloucestershire
- Country: England
- Sovereign state: United Kingdom
- Post town: Cheltenham
- Postcode district: GL54
- Dialling code: 01242

Withington is a Cotswold village and civil parish in Gloucestershire, England, about 7 miles (11 km) southeast of Cheltenham and 8 miles (13 km) north of Cirencester. The River Coln runs through the village. The parish includes the hamlets of Hilcot, Foxcote and Cassey Compton. The parish population taken at the 2021 census was 510.

== Name origins ==
The origin of the name is unclear but it is found in records as early as 737 AD as Wudiandun, which would mean the hill of Wudia: Wudia may be a real settler or the legendary Germanic hero Witege. The other English places called Withington may have different origins. In his 1955 work, H. P. R. Finberg argued for continuity between Anglo-Saxon Withington and an earlier Roman settlement. During Saxon times there was an important monastery at Withington.

== Sites of interest ==
=== Buildings ===
The site of a Roman villa lies to the south of the village. Remains of the villa were rediscovered in 1811 by Samuel Lysons, and investigations by the Time Team television programme for an episode first broadcast in 2006 found further Romano-British buildings east of the villa, towards the river.

The parish church of St Michael and All Angels dates from the 12th century and is a grade I listed building. The church was altered in the 15th century when the Perpendicular clerestory and higher tower were added, and has been described as "a typical example of an important Cotswold church".

Opposite the church is Withington Church of England Primary School. The school first opened in 1856, built on the site of the former Church house. In December 2025, the school had 11 pupils. It ceased teaching in February 2026, initially temporarily due to staff shortage, before issuing a statutory notice to close permanently at the end of the 2025/26 school year.

Behind the primary school is the Manor House, Withington, a grade II listed building.

From 1891 to 1961, trains served Withington (Glos) railway station on the Midland and South Western Junction Railway, which ran between Cirencester Watermoor station (closed to passengers in 1961) and Cheltenham Spa. Bridges and structures formerly used for the railway can still be found around the village.

=== Public houses ===
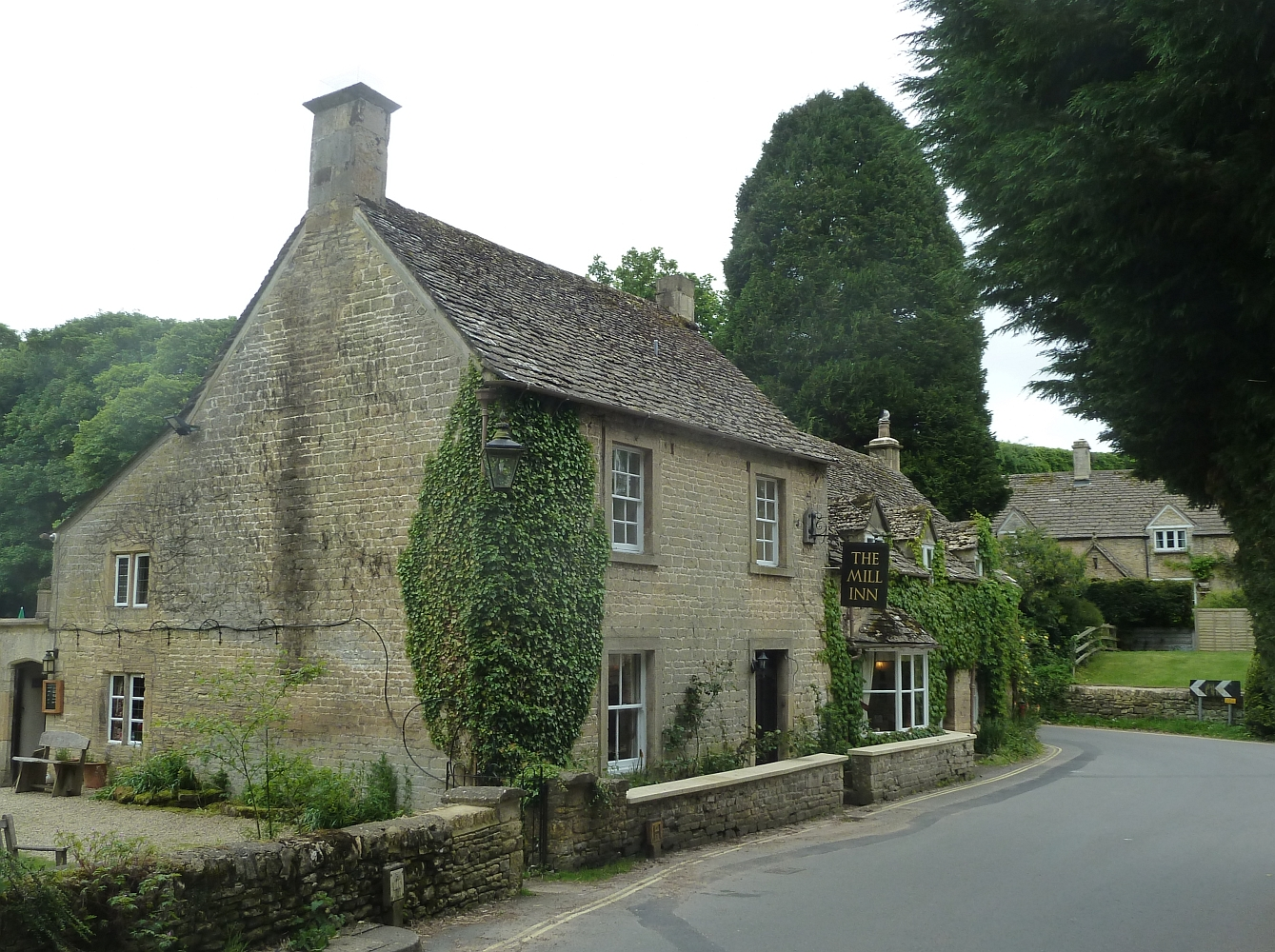
Outside view of The Mill Inn

Before the Kings Head closed down in 2017, there were two pubs in Withington. The Mill Inn, now the only pub in Withington, is credited locally with creating the popular "chicken in a basket" fried chicken and chips meal in the 1960s. The building of the Kings Head is now a house.

The River Coln runs through garden of The Mill Inn, separating part of the garden from the main building. The Mill Inn is a grade II listed building.

=== Other ===
Fergal O'Brien and Bailley & Nicholls racing, two established horse racing trainers, are both based at neighbouring farms outside the village. Fergal O'Brien Racing is based at Ravenswell farm, and Bailley & Nicholls Racing is based at Thorndale farm.

The 2000trees music festival is held annually at Upcote Farm, near the village.

== History ==
=== Filming of "Men" ===
From April to May 2021, it was filmed as the fictional village of Cotson for the folk horror film Men, released in 2022 and directed by Alex Garland.

=== 1963 air crash ===
Two miles east of Chedworth on Thursday 2 May 1963, 23 year old Flt Lt Charles J Sturt, ejected from his BAC Jet Provost over Northleach. Firemen attended from Cirencester and Northleach. The Jet Provost aircraft was from RAF Little Rissington.

Charles Sturt would be Group Captain Sturt, by the late 1980s. His brother Sqn Ldr Peter Sturt ejected from Harrier XV791 on 9 July 1973, with 20 Sqn from RAF Wildenrath, after suffering a bird strike.

== Gallery ==
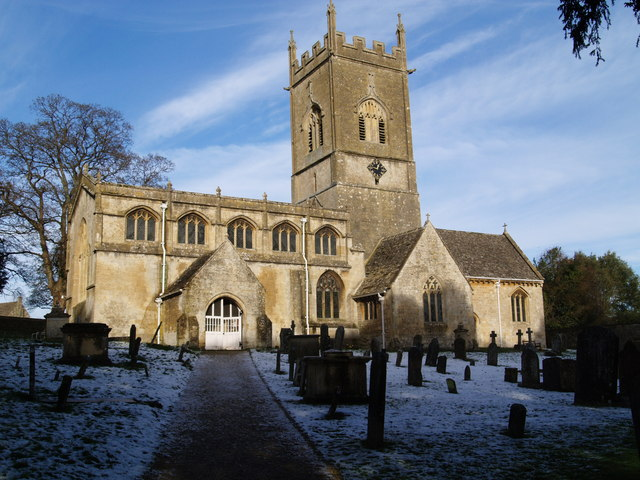
Church of St Michael, Withington

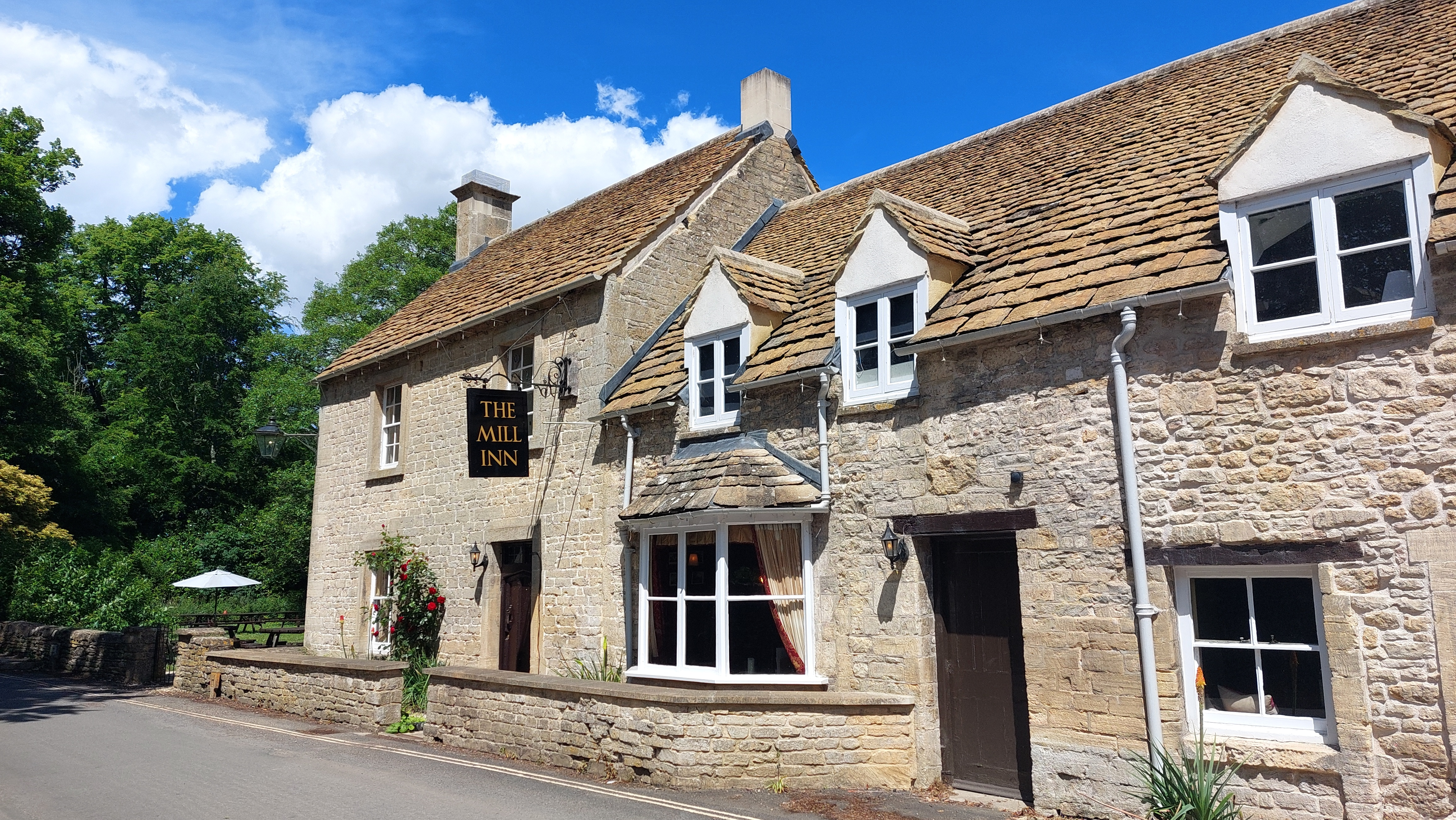
The Mill Inn, the only public house in Withington

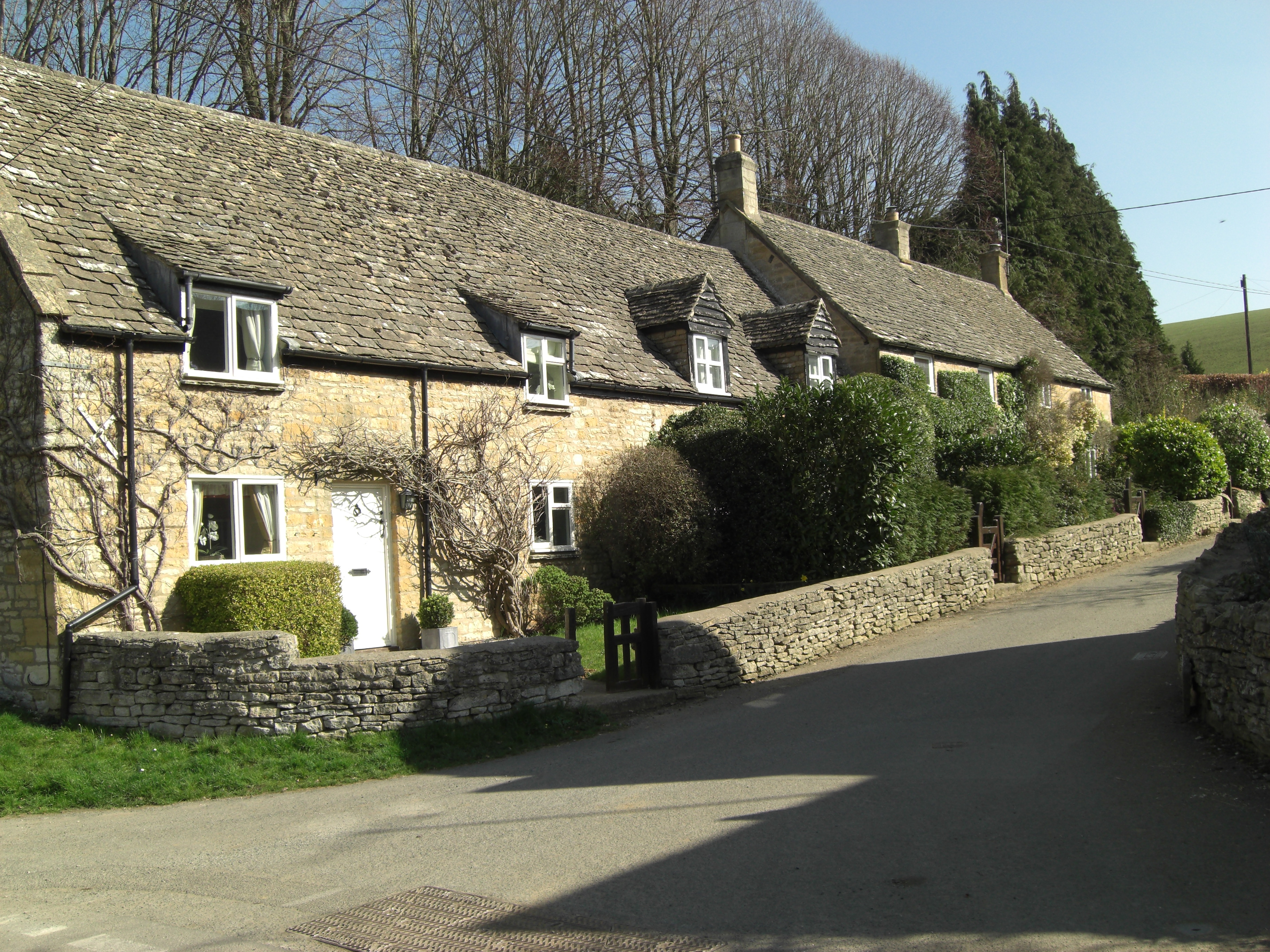
Some houses in the Cotswold stone cottages style within Withington.

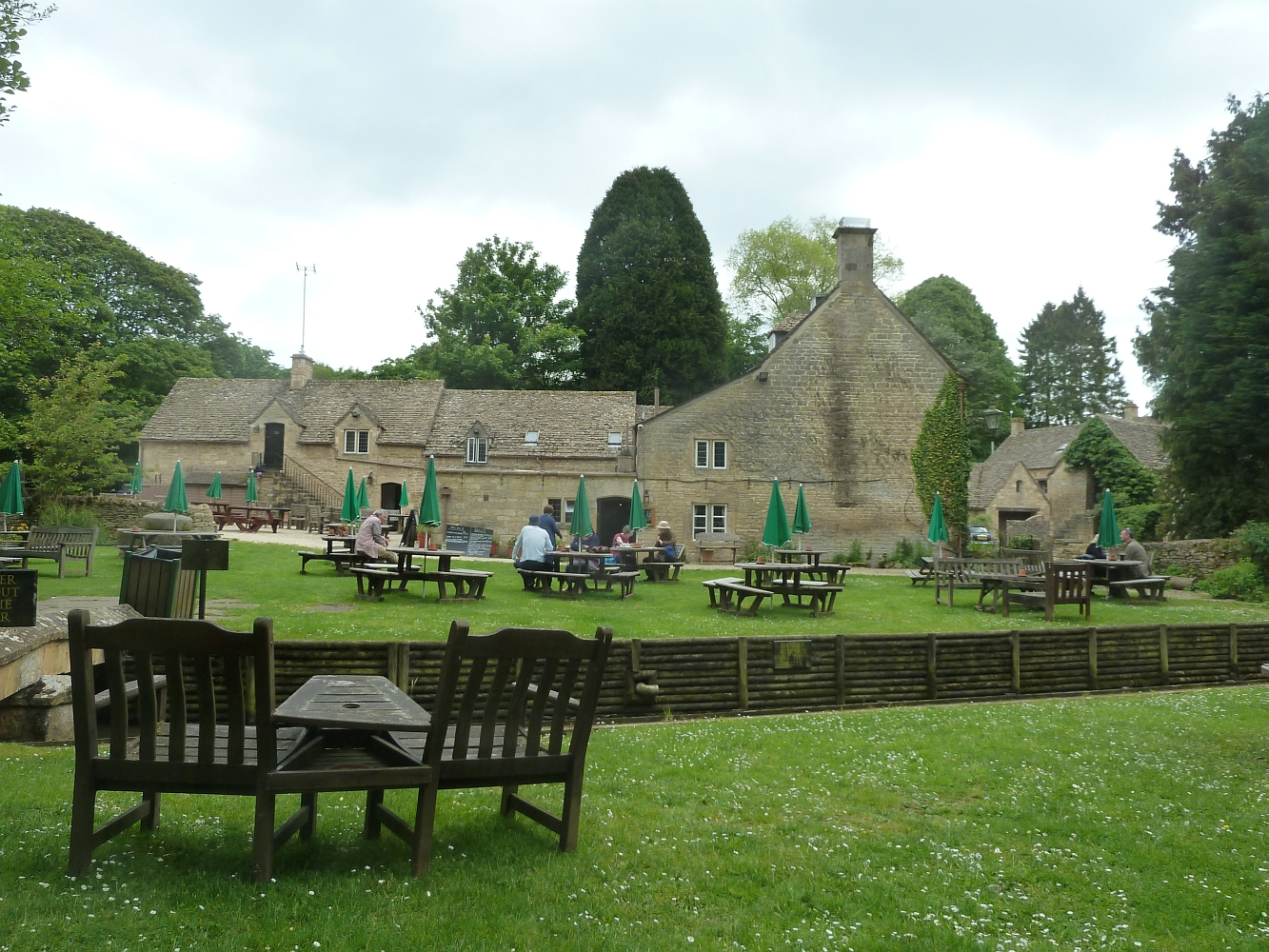
Garden view of The Mill Inn
