= Kimberley Dayle Edwards =

English singer

Kitty Brucknell
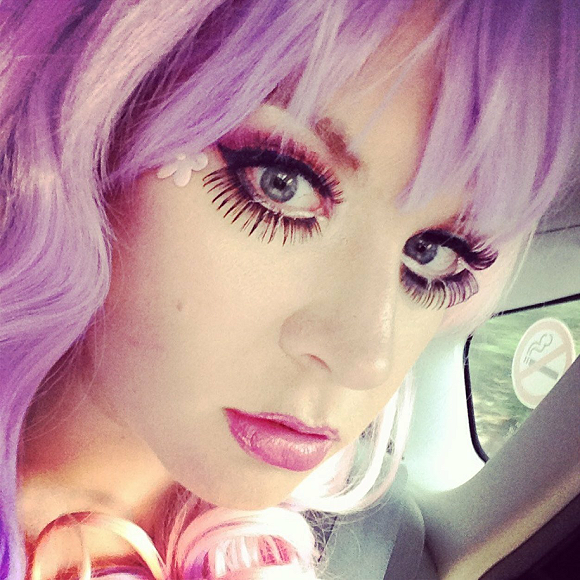
- Kimberley in 2014

Background information
- Born: Kimberley Dayle Edwards; 15 November 1984 (age 41); Cheltenham, Gloucestershire, England
- Genre: Pop
- Occupation: Singer
- Years active: 2011–present
- Labels: Whiskey Records; Absolute
- Website: kittybrucknell.com

Kimberley Dayle Edwards (born 15 November 1984), formerly known professionally as Kitty Brucknell, is an English pop singer. She rose to fame as a contestant on the eighth series of The X Factor in 2011, where she was the tenth contestant eliminated.

In addition to her musical career, Kimberley has cultivated a significant online presence, particularly on TikTok, where she shares her passion for Edwardian fashion and Titanic history. She has garnered a dedicated following by creating content that explores the elegance and intricacies of early 20th-century fashion, often drawing parallels to the opulence of Titanic-era attire.

== Early life and education ==
Kimberley Dayle Edwards was born in Cheltenham, Gloucestershire, on 15 November 1984. She started singing at an early age, as well as playing the violin and the piano. Throughout her childhood, she took part in a number of charity concerts and musical theatre performances, and was a prolific award winner in the Cheltenham Competitive Festival. At the age of 11, she won a place in the National Children's Orchestra of Great Britain and continued touring with them annually. She was awarded music scholarships to Dean Close School, St. Edward's School and Clifton College in Bristol. She began touring internationally at the age of 16.

In 2003, Edwards began writing and directing Interference, a science-fiction film. The film was accepted for the 2005 Cannes Film Festival. Following this, it was shown at the Portobello Film Festival and Palm Springs.

== Career ==
=== 2007–11: Early career ===
Before The X Factor, Kimberley worked as a Britney Spears, Christina Aguilera, and Lady Gaga tribute act. In June 2009, she appeared on Britney Spears Saved My Life, a documentary which aired on BBC Three. She appeared in series 1 of ITV's Dinner Date in 2010.

In 2010, she contracted Guillain–Barré syndrome, a life-threatening muscle disorder, whilst singing in Corfu, which left her paralysed for four months.

=== 2011: The X Factor ===
In 2011, Kimberley (then known as Kitty Brucknell) auditioned for the eighth series of The X Factor in front of judges Louis Walsh, Gary Barlow, Kelly Rowland and Tulisa. In her audition, she sang "The Edge of Glory" and all four judges voted to send her through to the "bootcamp" stage. She performed "You Got the Love" and "Feeling Good" at bootcamp, and made it through to judges' houses. After performing "Beautiful Disaster", Walsh put her through to the live shows in his Over 25s category alongside Johnny Robinson, Sami Brookes and Jonjo Kerr.

Brucknell was in the final showdown three times during the show: in weeks 3 (with Sami Brookes), 5 (with Johnny Robinson) and 6 (with Misha B). In week 3, she was saved by a majority vote from the judges. Voting statistics revealed that Brookes received more votes than Brucknell meaning if the result went to deadlock, Brookes would have been saved and Brucknell would've been sent home. In week 5, she fell in the bottom three and was saved by a majority vote from the judges. However, Robinson received more votes than Brucknell which meant that if the result went to deadlock, Robinson would have been saved and Brucknell would've been sent home. Brucknell was finally sent home in week 6 only after Walsh voted to save her. However, voting statistics revealed that Brucknell received more votes than Misha B meaning if the result went to deadlock, Brucknell would have been saved and sent through to week 7, while Misha B would've been sent home.

=== Performances ===
| Stage | Show | Song | Theme | Result | Final showdown | |
| Stage | Show | Song | Theme | Result | Song | Result |
|---|---|---|---|---|---|---|
| Semi-finals | Auditions | "The Edge of Glory" | Free choice | Advanced | None | |
| Semi-finals | Bootcamp 1 | "You Got the Love" | Bootcamp challenge | Advanced | None | |
| Semi-finals | Bootcamp 2 | "Feeling Good" | Bootcamp songs | Advanced | None | |
| Semi-finals | Judges' houses | "Beautiful Disaster" | Free choice | Advanced | None | |
| Finals | Live show 1 | "Who Wants to Live Forever" | Britain vs. America | Saved by Walsh | None | |
| Finals | Live show 2 | "It's Oh So Quiet" | Love and heartbreak | Safe (10th) | None | |
| Finals | Live show 3 | "Live and Let Die" | Rock | Bottom two (11th) | "The Edge of Glory" | Saved (Minority) |
| Finals | Live show 4 | "Sweet Dreams (Are Made of This)" | Halloween | Safe (4th) | None | |
| Finals | Live show 5 | "Like a Prayer" | Club classics | Bottom three (8th) | "Beautiful Disaster" | Saved (Minority) |
| Finals | Live show 6 | "Don't Stop Me Now" | Lady Gaga vs. Queen | Bottom two (6th) | "Over the Rainbow" | Eliminated (Majority) |

=== 2012–present: Glamour and Damage ===
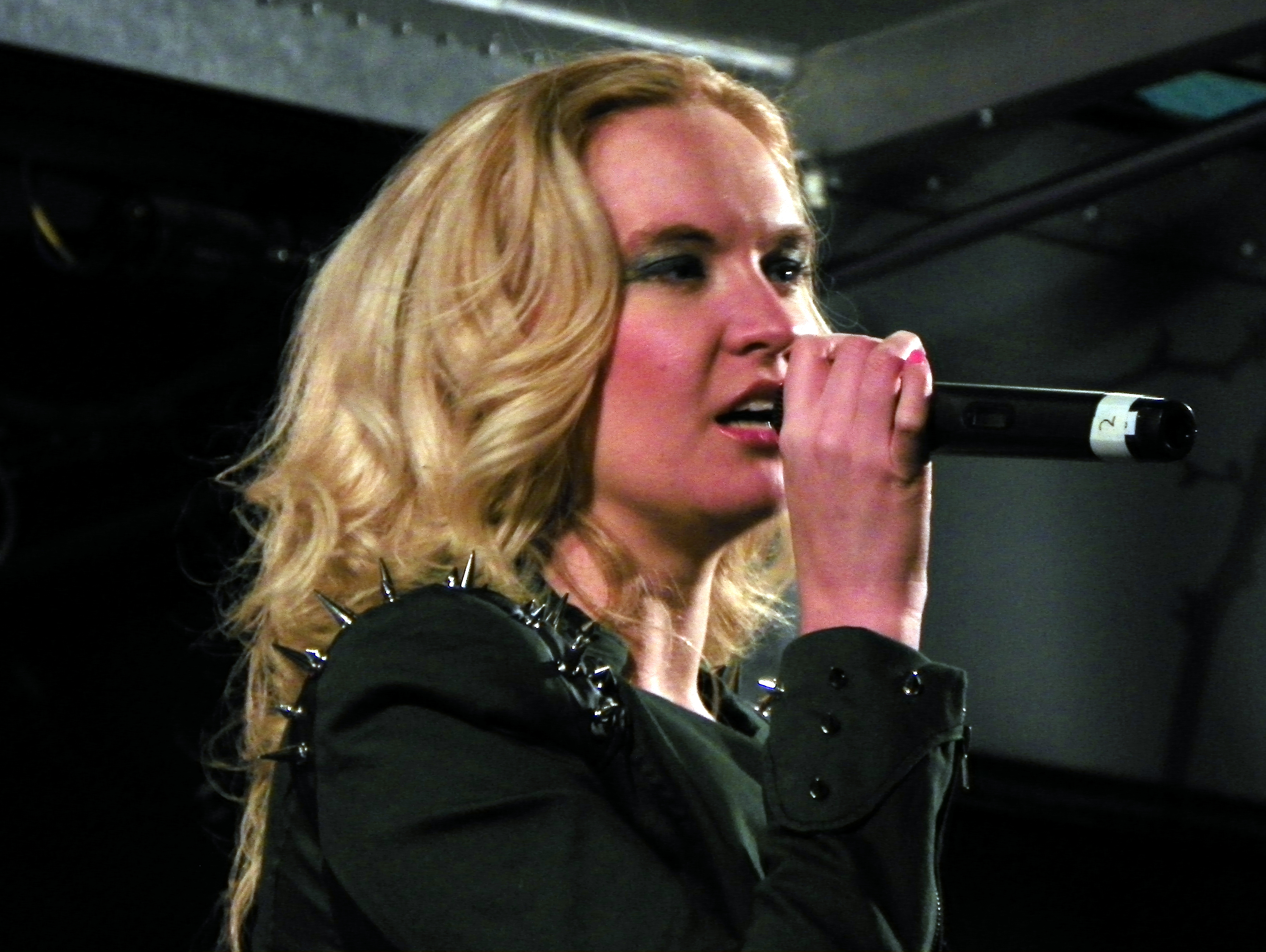
Kitty in 2012.

Following the X Factor Live Tour 2012, Edwards began teasing the release of her track "Red Shoes". Brucknell returned to The X Factor in 2013 when she performed alongside other former contestants such as Rylan Clark, Jedward, Wagner, 2 Shoes, Diva Fever and Johnny Robinson at the final in Wembley Arena. In January 2013, she went on her first tour which was dubbed the "Glamour and Damage" Tour. She performed "The Damage is Done" from her then forthcoming album Glamour and Damage. She featured on a single which was released in Germany entitled "No Tomorrow".

In August, she shared one of her original tracks "Chains", which garnered a lot of interest from major online blogs, even with a mention from Brian May of Queen. On 4 May, Kitty announced that her debut single "Glitter in the Sky" would be released on 19 October 2014. Her debut album Glamour and Damage was launched on Pledge Music where it was available to pre-order along with many other exclusives. Within the two weeks of its launch, she had successfully reached over 25% of her goal. On 2 August, she successfully reached 100% of her goal. Her debut album, Glamour and Damage was released on 1 November 2014 through Pledge Music.

She attempted to represent Switzerland at the Eurovision Song Contest 2015 with the song "Yearning". The song was written by Kitty with Dai Smith and Allyson Summerhayes (also known as 'The Elements'). Kitty's Eurovision attempt was on behalf of escnews.org who were reportedly acting as her management team during the Eurovision season 2015. On 25 November 2014, it was revealed that Kitty was not one of the nine acts selected by SRF that moved on to the live auditions held in Zürich and was eliminated. She was later shortlisted for the Moldovan national final with her songs "Yearning" and "Remix". On 17 January 2015, it was announced that "Remix" had advanced to the semi-final stage held in February. She was eliminated from the competition during the first semi-final on 24 February 2015.

She revealed in an interview that the reason why she did not attempt to represent the UK was because the BBC felt it was a conflict of interest for a former X Factor contestant to be promoted by them given their involvement with the Eurovision and the fact that they already have their own singing contest, The Voice UK, although former X Factor contestant Andy Abraham represented the UK in 2008.

Kitty took the ESC News’ Track of the Year 2015 title with her Moldovan National Final entry "Yearning", with 71% of the votes.

She also co-owns an international talent agency called Rockstars Agency, LLC, representing talent in the US, Canada and UK for online content creation and live-streaming, primarily with TikTok influencers and Bigo Live creators, working with celebrities such as Perez Hilton and Sam Asghari.

== Personal life ==
As of January 2016, Kimberley lives in Los Angeles.

She is also an avid figure skater, having taken up the sport in 2018 and competes in adult competitions in the US at Bronze level.

== Discography ==
=== Studio albums ===
| Album title | Album details |
|---|---|
| Glamour and Damage | Release date: 1 November 2014; Label: Whisky Records; Formats: Limited release digital download, compact disc |

=== Live albums ===
| Album title | Album details |
|---|---|
| The Glamour and Damage 2013 Live Tour | Release date: 14 January 2014; Label: Walton Music; Formats: compact disc |

=== Singles ===
| Year | Single | Peak chart position | Album |
| Year | Single | UK Indie Breakers | Album |
|---|---|---|---|
| 2014 | "Glitter in the Sky" | 9 | Glamour and Damage |
"—" denotes a recording that did not chart or was not released in that territory.

==== As featured artist ====
| Year | Title | Peak chart positions | | | Album |
| Year | Title | UK | IRE | SCO | Album |
|---|---|---|---|---|---|
| 2011 | "Wishing on a Star" (as part of The X Factor Finalists 2011 featuring JLS and One Direction) | 1 | 1 | 1 | Non-album singles |
| 2013 | "No Tomorrow" (Davis Redfield featuring Kitty Brucknell) | — | — | — | Non-album singles |
"—" denotes a recording that did not chart or was not released in that territory.

== Concert tours ==
- The X Factor Live Tour (2012)
- Glamour and Damage Tour (2013)

== Publications ==
- Are You On the List? A Guide on How to Become a Modern Socialite (co-author with Olivia Cox and Lewis-Duncan Weedon) (2014)
