= Glamour and Damage =

Studio album by Kitty Brucknell
- Released: 1 November 2014 (Europe)
- Recorded: 2013
- Genre: Pop
- Label: Whisky Records
- Producers: Jeff Calvert, Dai Smith, The Elements, Jaiden Lee

Singles from Glamour and Damage
- 1. "Glitter In The Sky" Released: 19 October 2014

Glamour and Damage is the debut solo album by British singer-songwriter Kitty Brucknell. It was released by Whisky Records via the direct fan-to-artist platform, Pledge Music on 1 November 2014.

== Album information ==
Brucknell began recording her debut album very soon after her departure from the X Factor, although it would be three years until the work would be released. Brucknell embarked on a small tour consisting of schools and small venues to promote the album pre release. She performed the forthcoming album track "The Damage Is Done". Although it was hinted that the track "Red Shoes" was part of the album, it was not on the final cut.

For the album's writing and production Brucknell teamed up with The Elements (a song writing and production team consisting of Dai Smith and Allyson Summerhayes) and Jeff Calvert of Typically Tropical fame. Tracks such as "Glitter In The Sky", "Yearning", "Hitch Another Ride" and "Remix" were written to demonstrate the less serious and more fun side to Brucknell's persona. While "Naked Truth" and "The Damage Is Done" were coloured by her true life events during her time on The X Factor, such as former friends selling stories about her to the press. The album was finished in 2014 and Brucknell made it available exclusive to Pledge Music, a direct fan-to-artist platform. The funds garnered from the Pledge Music campaign helped Brucknell fund the album's lead single, "Glitter In The Sky" which was released on 19 October 2014 and received generally positive reviews.

In November 2014, Brucknell announced that she would be attempting to represent Switzerland in the Eurovision Song Contest with the track "Yearning" which appears on the album. There has been much speculation to why she did not represent the United Kingdom, but she states that she felt the BBC would not allow her to enter due to being a contestant on the X Factor. She also felt Switzerland was open to helping new artists across the globe. Brucknell announced that she was not successful in the Swiss song election process and her track "Yearning" had not made it to the next round. As of December 2014, she is seeking alternative countries to represent and has been short listed for the Moldovan national final with two tracks from the Glamour and Damage album; "Yearning" and "Remix".

Glamour and Damage was released digitally on 1 November 2014 and CDs were pressed and distributed in the following month.

== Production ==
The Elements - Tracks 1, 4, 7, 8 and 10
Jeff Calvert - Tracks 5, 6 and 09
Dai Smith - Track 3
Jeff Calvert and Jaiden Lee - Track 2

== Artwork ==
The Glamour and Damage album's art was directed by Anthony Mark Walton, who has designed for the likes of Siobhan Fahey, Shakespears Sister, The Nolans, Anne Nolan, Maria Nayler and Honey Bane.

In 2013, Walton began preparing the Glamour and Damage images by collating various themes and backdrops. These images were revealed on Brucknell's official facebook profile the same year and a mock cover was revealed. It was decided that Walton's "Damaged Wallpaper" images would be used for the album.

The art is in keeping with the album theme and underwent several changes before the final cover was revealed on Brucknell's Pledge Music campaign page.

"The cover features a very glamorous Kitty backed by a damaged and grungy wallpaper, bringing together the Glamour and Damage. We really wanted to create an iconic image" says Walton.

== Track listing ==
1. "The Damage Is Done"
2. "Glitter In The Sky"
3. "Yearning2
4. "Where There's Fire"
5. "Chains"
6. "Light A Candle"
7. "Hitch Another Ride"
8. "Remix"
9. "Queen of Hearts"
10. "Naked Truth"

Bonus Tracks
Both physical and digital editions of the album feature two bonus tracks:

11. "Titanium In The Sky" (Fan Mashup Mix)
12. "Glitter In The Sky" (Morlando Radio Edit)
