= Dowdeswell Reservoir =

Reservoir in Gloucestershire, England

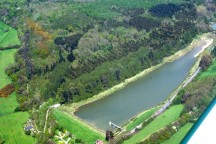
- Dowdeswell Reservoir and Wood from the south, residuum and Scobb's Grove off photo to right, and Cotswold Way National Trail to left of wood and below dam embankment

- Location within Gloucestershire
- Interactive map of Dowdeswell Reservoir
- Location: Dowdeswell, Gloucestershire
- Coordinates: 51°52′34″N 2°01′03″W
- Type: Reservoir
- River sources: River Chelt
- Basin countries: United Kingdom
- Managing agency: Environment Agency
- Designation: Protected
- Built: 1886
- Construction engineer: Cheltenham Corporation
- Max. length: 820 metres (2,690 ft)
- Max. width: 215 metres (705 ft)
- Surface area: 82 hectares (200 acres)
- Average depth: 5.835 metres (19.14 ft)
- Water volume: 125,000 cubic metres (4,400,000 cu ft)

Dowdeswell Reservoir is in the parish of Dowdeswell in Gloucestershire. The former water treatment works are in the parish of Charlton Kings. Thus they span the parish boundaries. They were originally built by Cheltenham Corporation to supply the town of Cheltenham with drinking water in 1886 and subsequently became part of the Severn Trent network.

== History ==
It is currently owned and managed by the Environment Agency and is managed as a 'balancing pond' for the water catchment from the east end of the valley.

Severn Trent closed the water treatment works with the commissioning of the Mythe Treatment Works on the river Severn, and the reservoir itself became a flood storage reservoir for the River Chelt in an attempt to protect the town of Cheltenham from flooding from the east. The town nonetheless suffered flooding in the July 2007 floods though this was not only from the river Chelt at Dowdeswell, but from all the streams which join the Chelt within the town and its outskirts. The Dowdeswell 'balancing pond' only deals with the Chelt (really a stream at this point in its life), Dowdeswell stream and runoff from the limestone scarp.

The Cotswold Way National Trail runs alongside the dam end of the reservoir (below the dam embankment) and alongside the western edge of Dowdeswell Woods. The reservoir and woods are listed in the ‘Cotswold District’ Local Plan 2001-2011 as Key Wildlife Sites.

They are near Arle Grove nature reserve.

== Dowdeswell Reservoir and Wood nature reserves ==
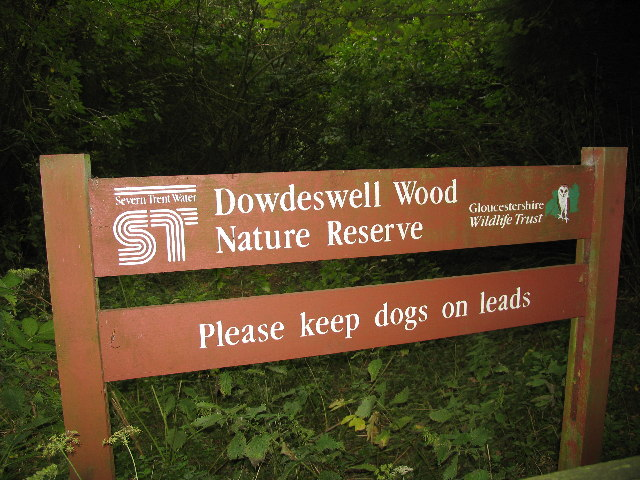
Dowdeswell Woods entrance sign

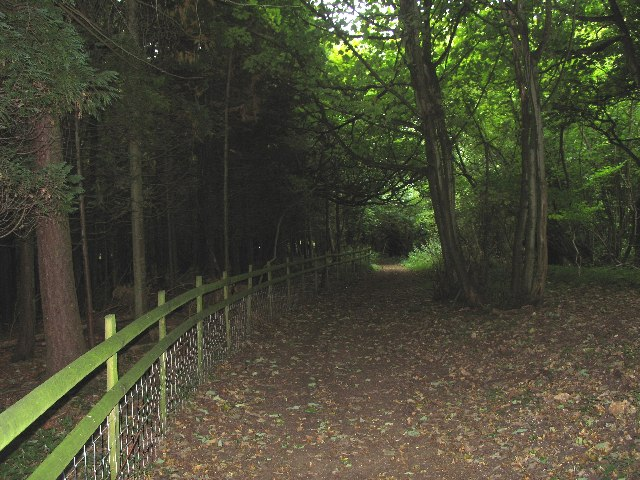
Cotswold Way in Dowdeswell Woods

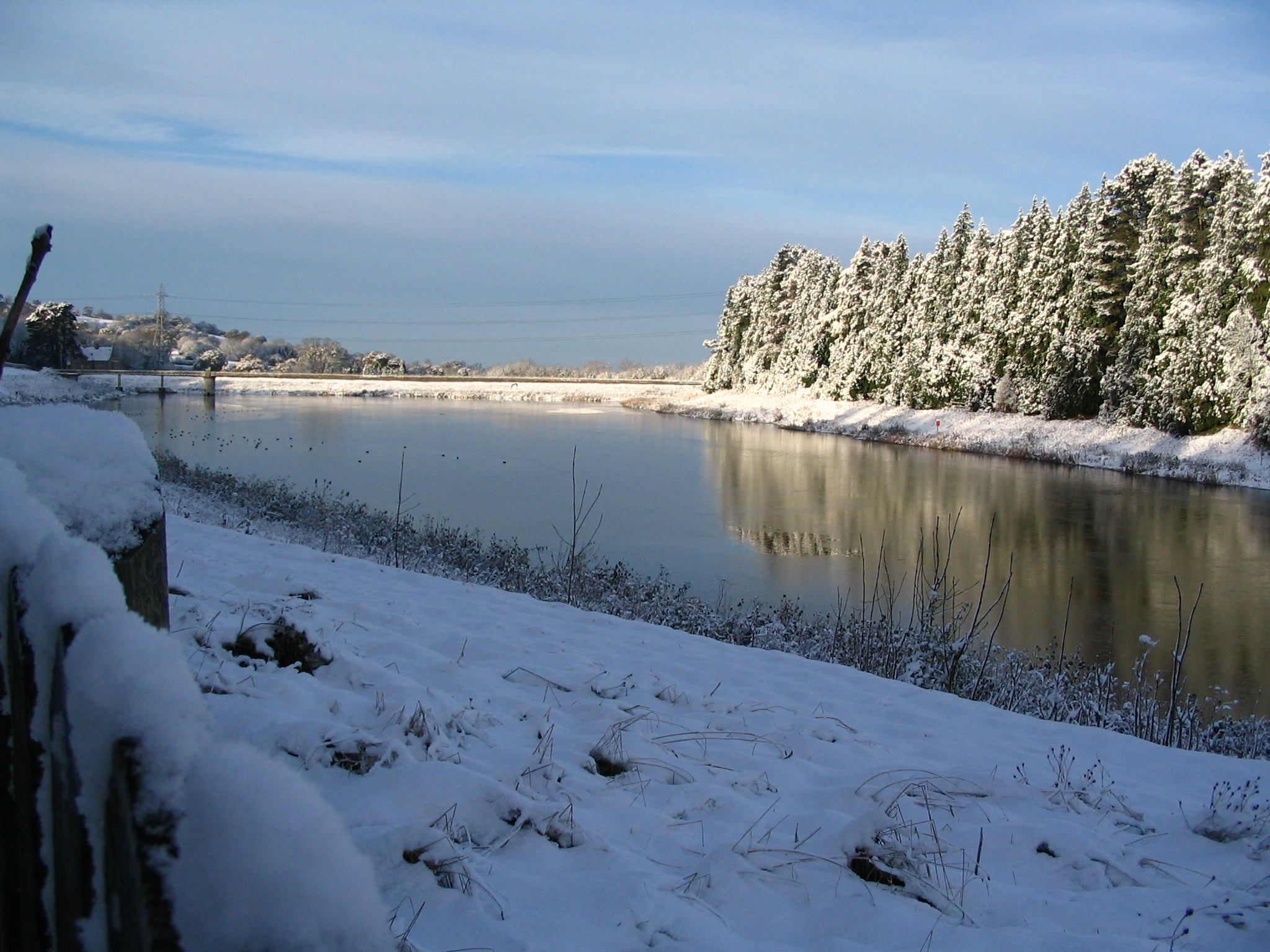
Reservoir towards dam end and wood edge, winter 2005

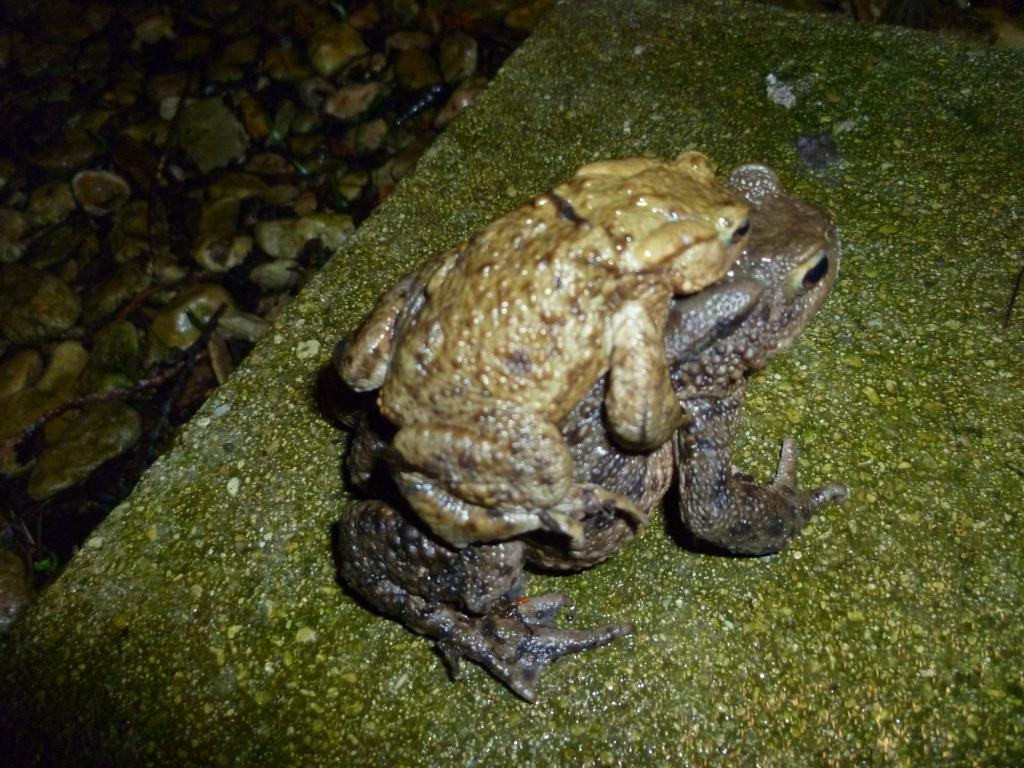
Common Toad (male and female pair) on 2013 migration to Dowdeswell Reservoir

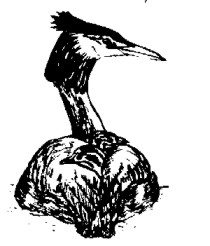
Great Crested Grebe with young on back

There is a site management plan from 1975 for the Dowdeswell Reservoir Nature Reserve. There are site management plans for the Dowdeswell Wood Nature Reserve for 1993 to 2002 and 2002 to 2011 along with various annual reports.

=== The Reservoir, Residuum and Scobb’s Grove ===
These areas (Reservoir, Residuum, Scobb's Grove) (grid reference SO997198) were established as a 9.3-hectare (23-acre) nature reserve with the Gloucestershire Trust for Nature Conservation (now the Gloucestershire Wildlife Trust) in 1973 under agreement with the North-West Gloucestershire Water Board originally.

The main body of water supports many resident and wintering wildfowl including Moorhen, Coot, Mallard and Little Grebe and Great Crested Grebes while the surrounding habits provide nesting sites. There is a significant aquatic and grassland flora including grassland supporting Common Spotted Orchid, Pyramidal Orchid and Cowslip. The reservoir is a major spawning ground for the Common Toad and there are signs which are opened each year at migration time on the A40 which runs alongside the reservoir. There were originally two toads tunnels from the south side of the A40 into the reservoir grassland, but these have since been removed as a result of roadworks.

The reservoir supports the native crayfish (Austropotamobius pallipes) which is protected on Schedule 5 of the Wildlife & Countryside Act 1981. During the engineering works undertaken in 1998 Severn Trent put in place a management programme for the protection of this white-clawed crayfish.

The associated water treatment yards historically have supported a significant flowering area of Autumn Lady's Tresses.

Scobb’s Grove is a separate copse of damp Ash, Alder, Hazel and Willow woodland containing ferns, Small Teasel and Alternate-leaved Golden-saxifrage. It has an interesting bird life including owls.

There is currently no lease agreement for these areas with the Gloucestershire Wildlife Trust.

=== Dowdeswell Wood ===
Dowdeswell wood (grid reference SO993204) is a 82-hectare (200-acre) site and lies on the northern slopes of the Chelt valley and one mile east of Charlton Kings. The wood forms part of the gathering grounds for Dowdeswell Reservoir and became an extension to this reserve in 1992 under agreement with Severn Trent.

Extensive management work was carried out and a way-marked series of paths were created accessible from the Cotswold Way national trail.

The character of this wood was changed dramatically in the 1950s and subsequently by replacing with conifers following felling of mature Oak, Ash, Beech and many diseased Elms. Replanting work has replaced conifers for broad-leaf.

A good ground flora is present mostly in the broad-leaved areas. Bluebell, Yellow Archangel, Wood Anemone, Moschatel, Early-purple Orchid and Ramsons (wood garlic). There are Roman Snails in a site of a Roman Settlement in the north of the wood. The Common Dormouse is present as are Roe and Muntjac deer.

There is currently no lease agreement for these areas with the Gloucestershire Wildlife Trust.

=== Further reading ===
- Atty, D, Haigh, D J R, Holland, Sonia, Long, D C, Porter, Steve (edited Miller, John, illustrated Ball, Arthur), October 1987, 'Plants and Animals of the Dowdeswell Reservoir Nature Reserve', Gloucestershire Trust for Nature Conservation
- Ball, Arthur, Barber, Bruce, undated, 'The Birds of Dowdeswell Reservoir Nature Reserve', The Gloucestershire Trust for Nature Conservation
- Ball, Arthur, 1987 to 2016, Dowdeswell Reservoir Nature Reserve Annual Bird Reports
- Crayfish Consultants International Ltd, 'Conservation of the native crayfish population at Dowdeswell Reservoir during engineering works', March 1998, prepared for Severn Trent Water (Conservation Officer: Jan Phillips)
- Gloucestershire Trust for Nature Conservation, 'Management Plan for Dowdeswell Reservoir Nature Reserve', 1975, commissioned by The North West Gloucestershire Water Board.
- Gloucestershire Wildlife Management, 'Dowdeswell Wood Nature Reserve - Site Management Plan', 1993-2002 & 2002-2011, commissioned by Severn Trent Water Limited
- Kelham, A, Sanderson, J, Doe, J, Edgeley-Smith, M, et al., 1979, 1990, 2002 editions, 'Nature Reserves of the Gloucestershire Trust for Nature Conservation/Gloucestershire Wildlife Trust' (includes Dowdeswell Reservoir and Dowdeswell Wood entries)
