= Andoversford and Dowdeswell railway station =

Former railway station in Gloucestershire, England

Coordinates: 51.87482°N 1.96573°W

Andoversford and Dowdeswell

General information
- Location: Andoversford, Cotswold; England

Other information
- Status: Disused

History
- Original company: Midland and South Western Junction Railway
- Pre-grouping: Midland and South Western Junction Railway
- Post-grouping: Great Western Railway

Key dates
- 1 August 1891: Station opens as Dowdeswell
- 1 October 1892: Station renamed Andoversford and Dowdeswell
- 1 April 1927: Station closes for passengers
- October 1962: Station closes for goods
Location

Andoversford and Dowdeswell railway station was on the Midland and South Western Junction Railway in Gloucestershire. The station opened to passengers on 1 August 1891 with the opening of the section of the line between Cirencester Watermoor and the junction at Andoversford with the Great Western Railway's Cheltenham Lansdown to Banbury line, which had opened in 1881.

== History ==
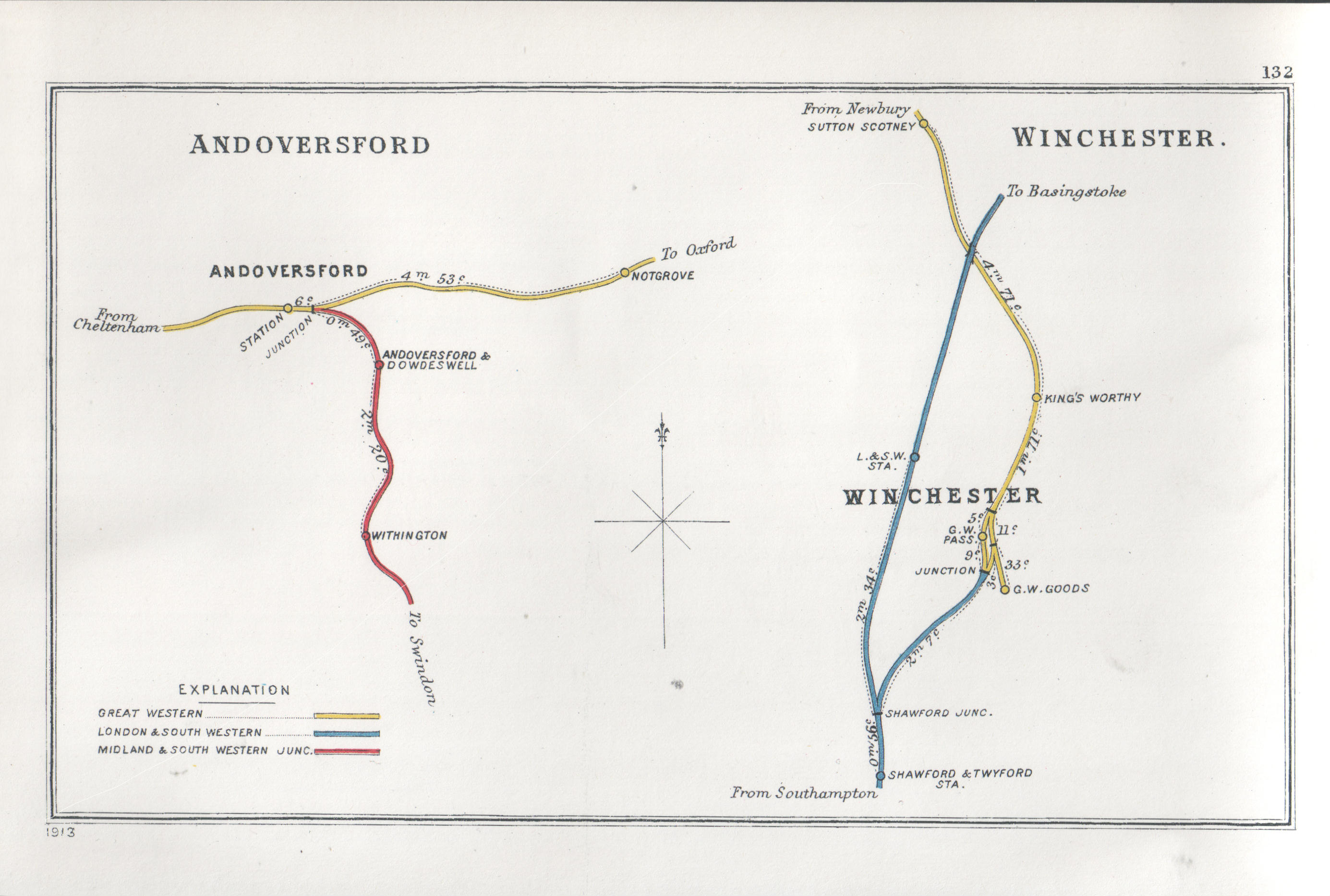
A 1913 Railway Clearing House map of railways in the vicinity of Andoversford & Dowdeswell

Andoversford and Dowdeswell was originally called just "Dowdeswell", though the station was much nearer the village of Andoversford. It was renamed about a year after it opened. The station owed its existence to the awkward relations between the M&SWJR and the GWR: though the Great Western allowed the newer line running powers over its line from Cheltenham to Andoversford junction, it did not allow the M&SWJR to stop its trains at Andoversford railway station. The GWR relented in 1904, but by then Andoversford and Dowdeswell was already built, and M&SWJR trains then stopped at both.

The Grouping of 1923 rationalised the situation. The M&SWJR was allocated to the GWR, and four years later the new owners closed Andoversford and Dowdeswell station to passengers.

On nationalisation in 1948 British Railways operated the remaining goods service and passenger trains which continued to pass the station until closure of the line in 1961. After its closure to passengers the station remained opened for goods traffic for a further 35 years to October 1962, outliving the rest of the M&SWJR, which had closed the previous year.

== The site today ==
The station building was used for some years afterwards as a transport cafe, but all trace has now gone.

Preceding station	Disused railways	Following station
Andoversford Junction	Great Western Railway; Midland and South Western Junction Railway	Withington
