= DoubleTree by Hilton Cheltenham-Cotswolds =

Country house hotel

Coordinates: 51.8744°N 2.0526°W

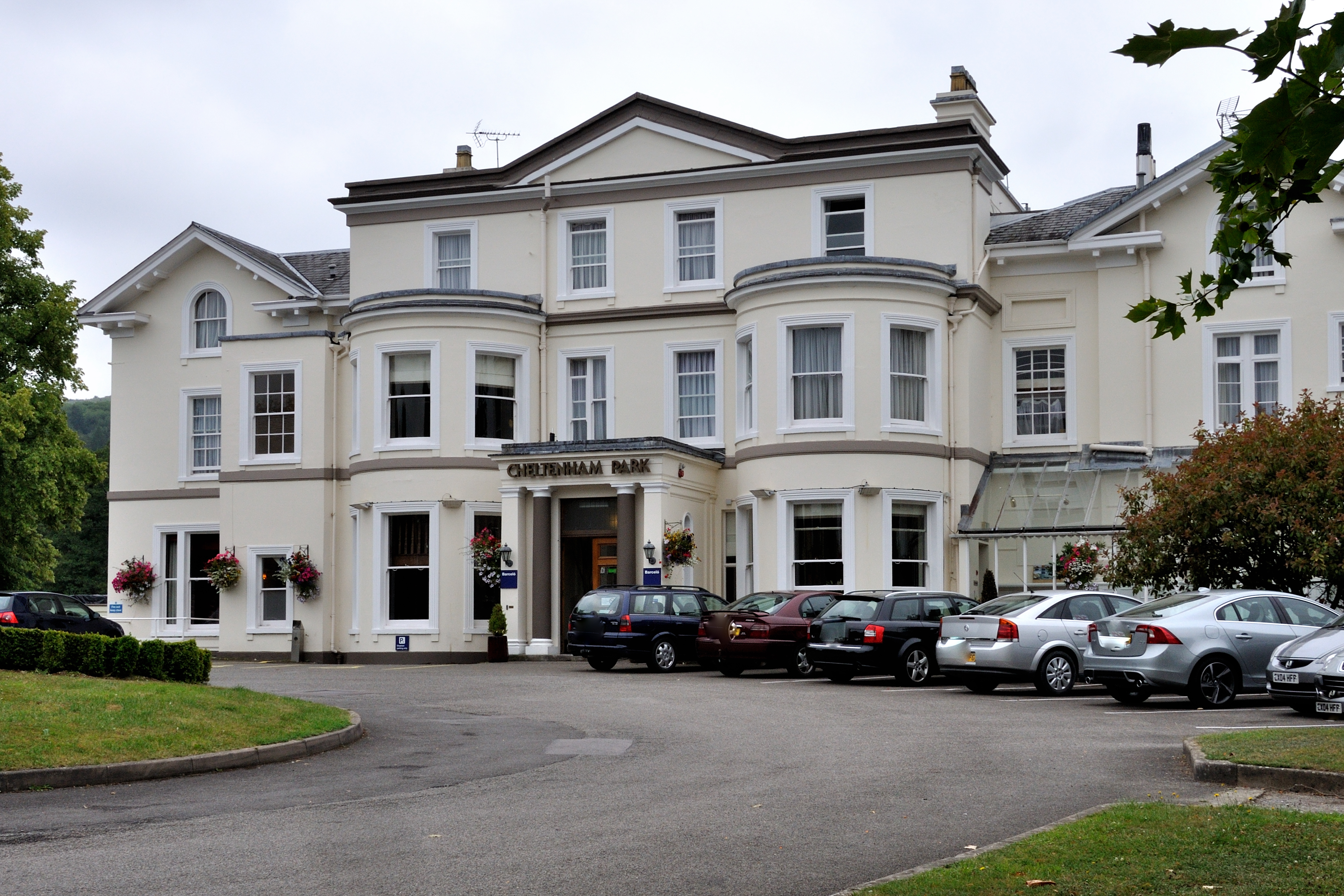
Cheltenham Park Hotel

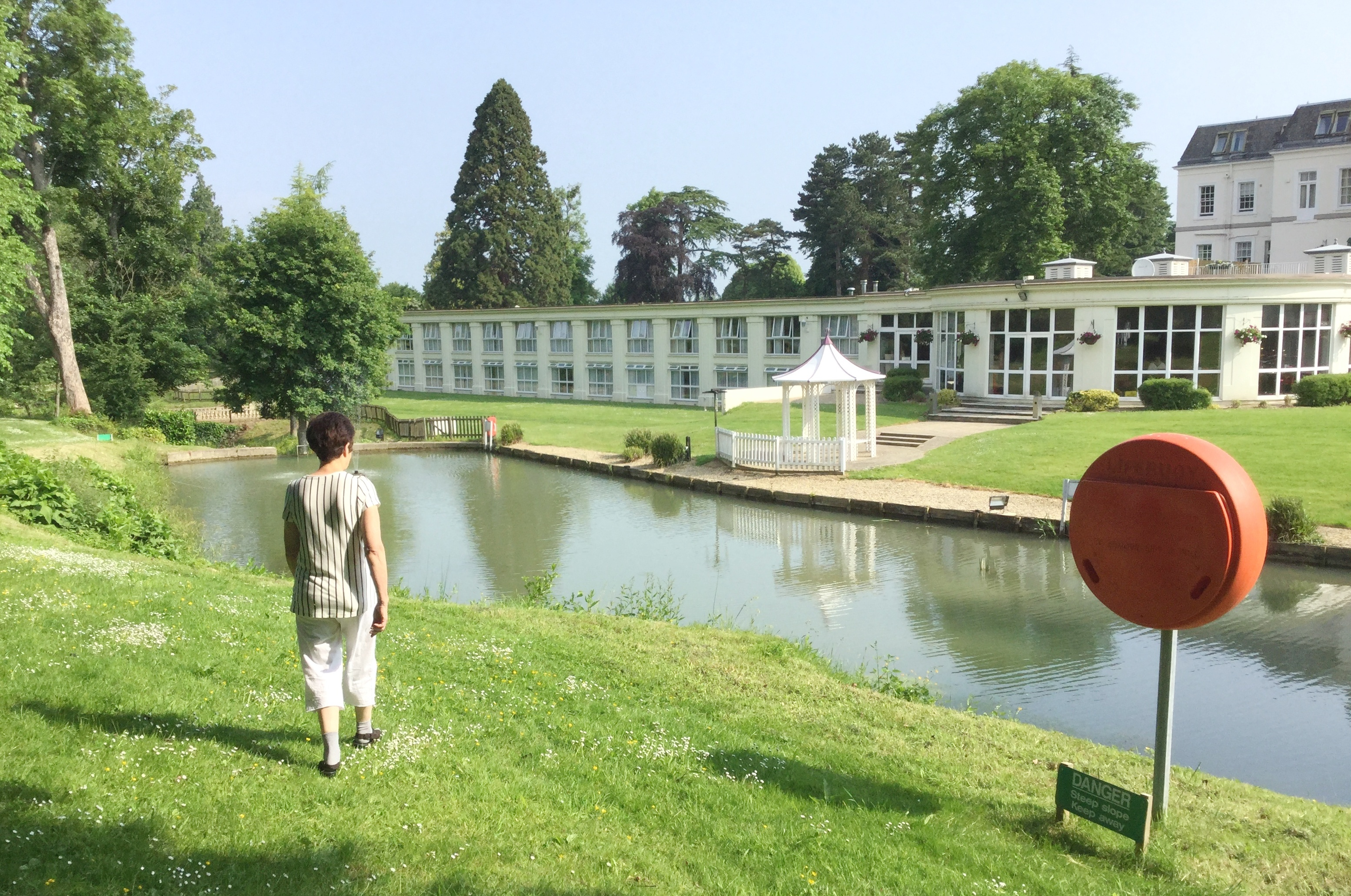
The back of the hotel in 2016. The main building is glimpsed on the right. In 2017 it was refurbished and named the ‘DoubleTree by Hilton’.

DoubleTree by Hilton Cheltenham-Cotswolds (earlier known as Cheltenham Park Hotel), Charlton Kings, is a Regency building of historical significance. It was previously called Lilleybrook. It stands on the site of an ancient manor which was rebuilt and/or improved in about 1700 (325 years ago) and again in 1816 (209 years ago). In 1831 (194 years ago) it was badly damaged by fire and in 1833 (192 years ago)it was again rebuilt. This is the house which stands today. Over the next century it was the home to several notable families and in 1922 (103 years ago) opened as a hotel. The building was renovated in 2017 and the hotel subsequently adopted the DoubleTree franchise. The hotel is managed by Michels & Taylor.

== Early residents ==
One of the early residents of Lilleybrook House was Rear-Admiral Robert Mansell who bought the property in 1816 and made major improvements to the house. This building which is shown on the right was drawn in 1826. It was damaged by fire in 1831 and rebuilt by the Mansells in 1833. Rear-Admiral Robert Mansell (1773–1838) was born 1773 in Cosgrove, Northamptonshre. His father was Major General John Mansell who owned Cosgrove Hall and his mother was Mary-Ann Biggin, a wealthy heiress. He entered the Navy at an early age and was rapidly promoted becoming a Commander at the age of twenty-one. In 1803 he married Frances Charlotta Thorold (1784–1846) who was the daughter of Reverend William Thorold of Weelsby House. The couple had three children, two sons and a daughter.

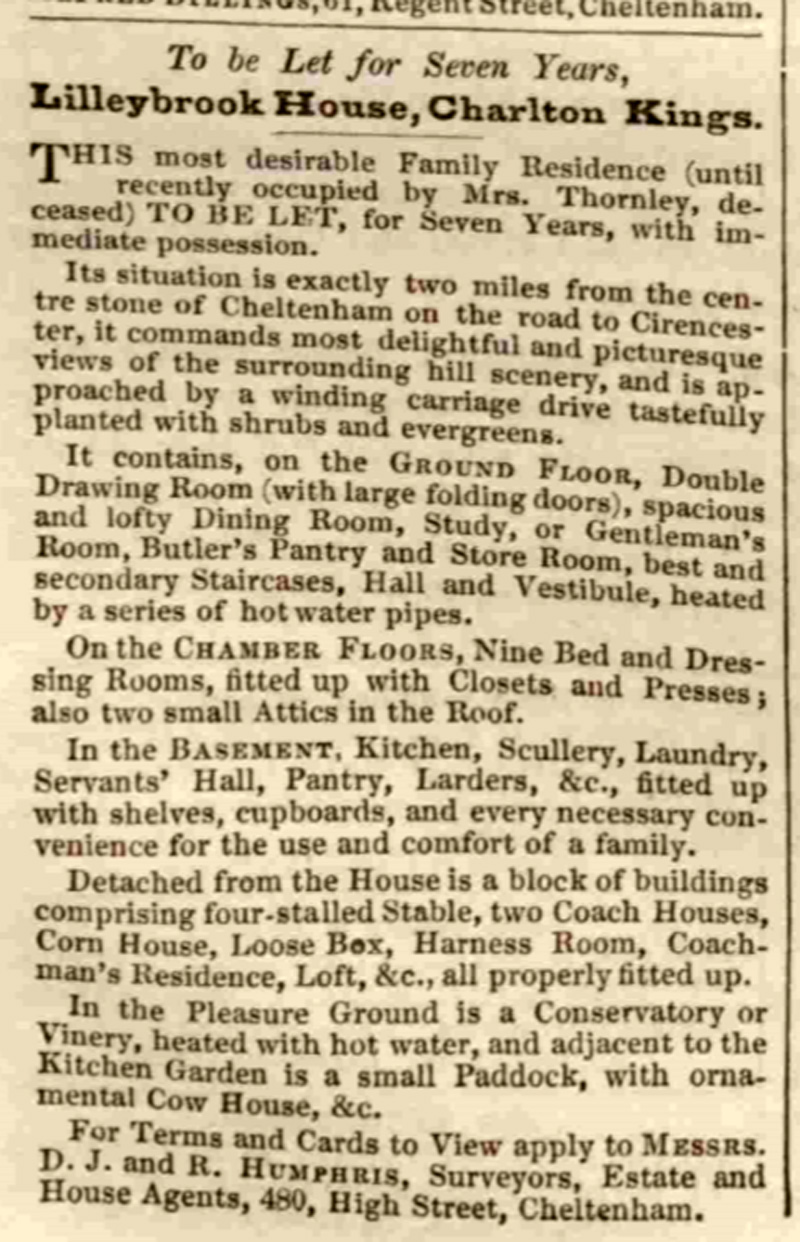
Rental notice of 1865

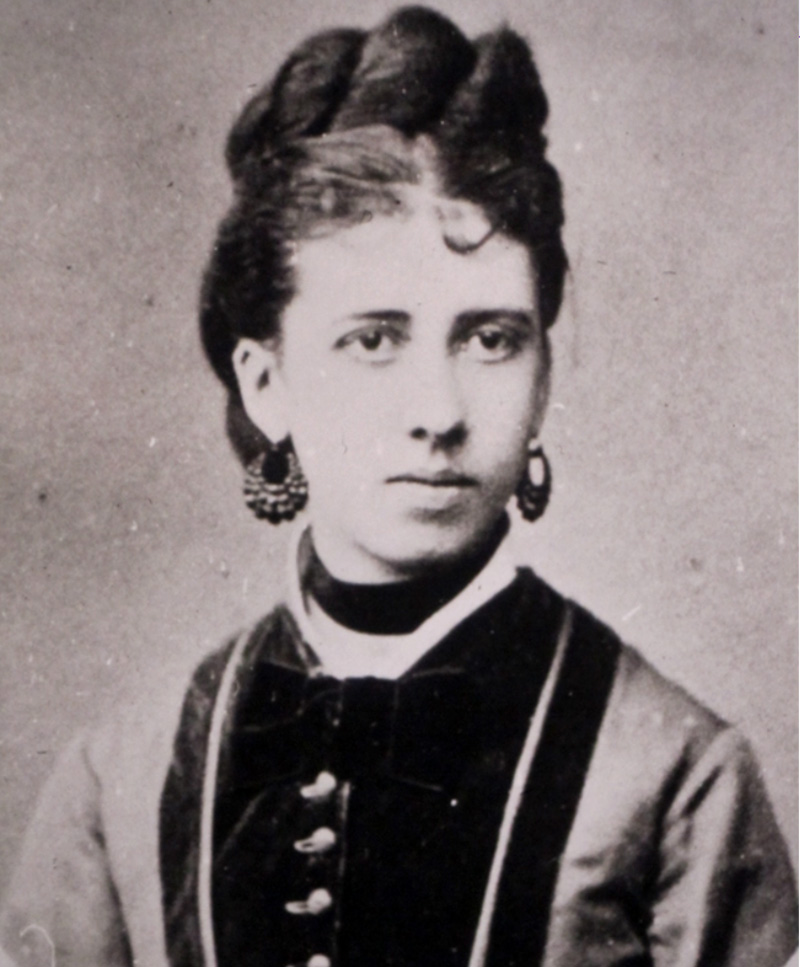
Agnes Gwynne, a resident in about 1880

Robert died in 1838 at Charlton Kings and Frances, his wife continued to live at the house until her death in 1846. The property was then sold and bought by Captain Shapland Swiny. He lived there for several years with his wife Georgiana and had two of his children. He later moved to Cheltenham and built New Court.

In about 1855 John Thornely (sometimes spelt Thornley) purchased the property. John Thornely (1803–1857) was born in 1803 Glossop, Derbyshire. He was the only son of John Thornely (1777–1849) who owned Dodworth Hall in Yorkshire. In 1840 he married Elizabeth Cockle but the couple had no children. John died in 1858 and Elizabeth continued to live at the house until her death in 1864. As they had no heirs the property was inherited by a distant relative Mary Thornley Ollivant (1835–1876) who had married William Dugdale (1839–1896) two years earlier and so the property was brought into the Dugdale family. William Dugdale owned Simonstone Hall so the house was rented for many years. The rental notice of 1865 is shown.

Lieutenant Colonel Robert Cumming (1822–1905) and his wife Anna Maria were the first tenants. They were followed by Jane Crawshay Gwynne (1809–1900) who was the widow of Colonel Alban Lewis Thomas Jones Gwynne of Aberaeron in Wales. She moved to the house in about 1880 with her two daughters Agnes and Edith. A picture of Agnes is shown.

== Later residents ==
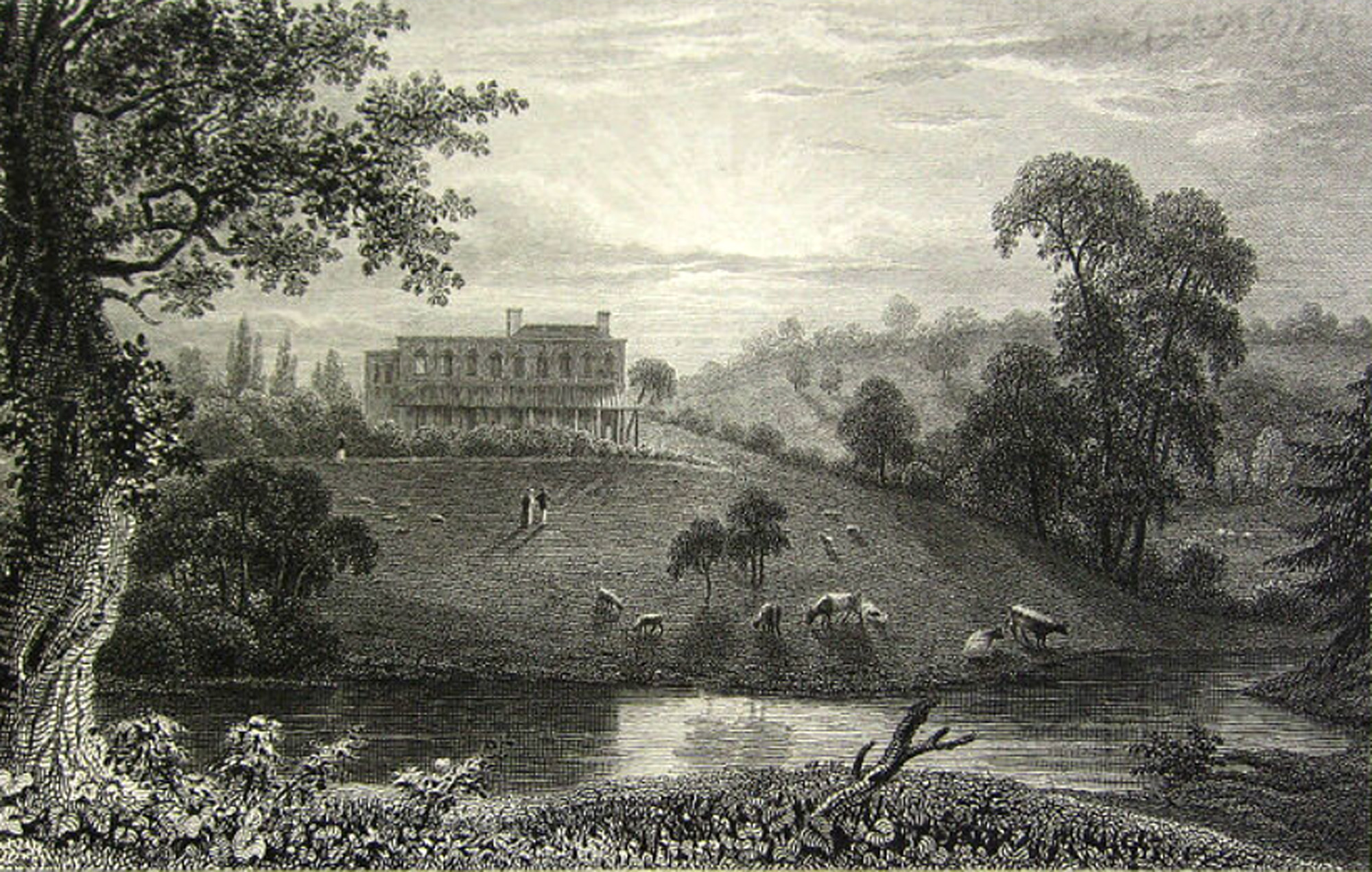
Cheltenham Park Hotel in 1826 before the fire

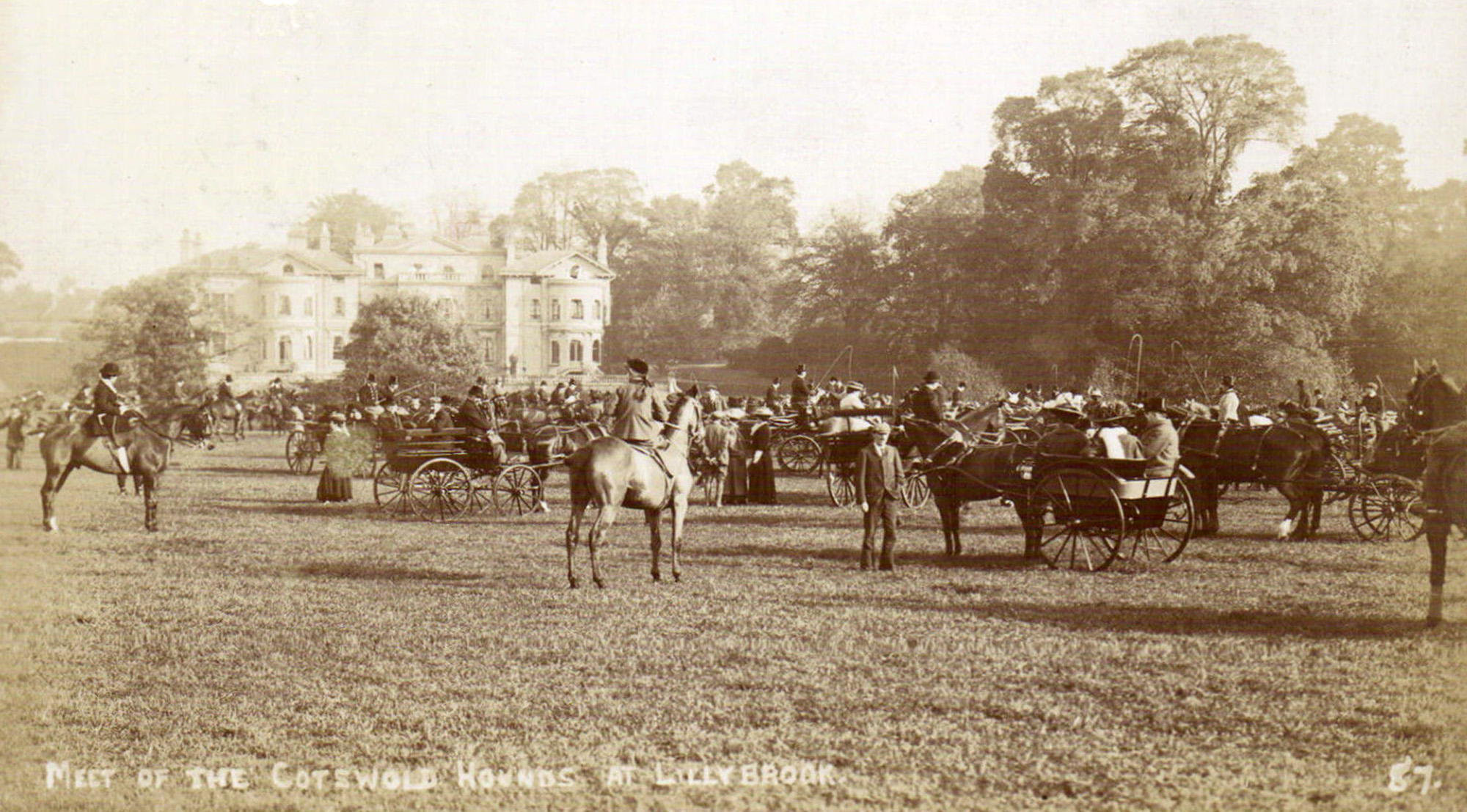
Opening of the Hunt at Lilleybrook (now Cheltenham Park Hotel) in 1900

When William Dugdale died in 1896 his eldest daughter Mary Ollivant Dugdale (1865–1932) inherited the house. A year earlier in 1895 she had married Herbert Owen Lord and so the property was brought into the Lord family.

Herbert Owen Lord (1854–1928) was born in 1854 in London. His father was Captain Arthur Owen Lord of 72nd Highlanders. After Mary inherited Lilleybrook in 1896 the couple decided to live there. They had two daughters. Herbert became the Master of the Cotswold Hunt and received numerous accolades in the newspapers for his skill. A picture of the start the hunt at Lilleybrook in about 1900 is shown.

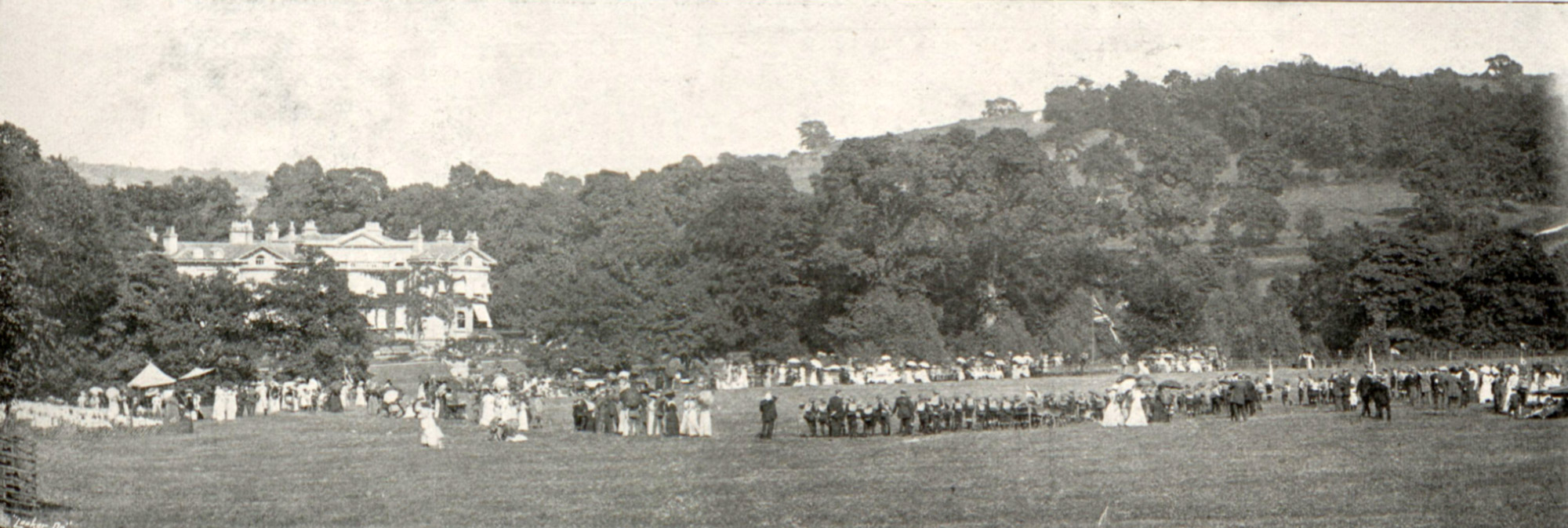
Red Cross Event held in 1911

Mary became President of the Red Cross and held many events at the property to raise funds.

In 1915 she held a special garden party for some of the wounded soldiers that were in the Red Cross hospitals locally. Two of the notable people who attended this event were Cecilia Bowes-Lyons, Countess of Stratmore and Lady Maud Bowes-Lyon, the mother and aunt of the Queen Elizabeth The Queen Mother. The papers described the occasion in the following terms.

"On Tuesday afternoon hundreds of wounded soldiers were to be seen being conveyed towards Charlton Kings and later in the evening the inhabitants of the district were all at their doors and windows watching and cheering the returning warriors. The occasion of this migration was a glorious garden party given with their usual bountiful hospitality by Mr and Mrs Herbert Lord in the beautiful grounds at Lilleybrook to the whole of the wounded soldiers who were sufficiently convalescent to come from all the Red Cross hospitals in the district.

The number of soldiers present was about 320, guests and nurses making up a total of 400. James’ Band played on the lawn all the afternoon while the soldiers strolled in admiring parties through the beautiful gardens and viewed the Cotswold Hounds who were brought up to the paddock. Then a bountiful tea was spread in a corner of one of the lawns and full justice was done to the good things provided."

In 1921 the Lord family sold the property and in the following year it opened as a hotel. It still serves this function today.
