= Pat Lavery =

Irish rugby union player

- Full name: Patrick H.D. Lavery
- Born: 29 April 1949 (age 77) Cheltenham, England

Rugby union career
- Position: Centre / Wing
International career
Years	Team	Apps	(Points)
1974–76	Ireland	2	(0)

Patrick H.D. Lavery (born 29 April 1949) is an English-born former Ireland rugby union international.

Born in Cheltenham, Lavery attended Whitefriars School and was an England Under 19 Schools XV representative.

Lavery moved to London after leaving school, where he competed for Richmond and London Irish, while also playing provincial rugby for Munster. He gained two caps for Ireland, debuting in a draw with Wales during the championship winning 1974 Five Nations campaign. His other appearance was in the 1976 Five Nations, also against Wales.

== See also ==
- List of Ireland national rugby union players
