= Arle Grove =

Nature reserve in Gloucestershire, England

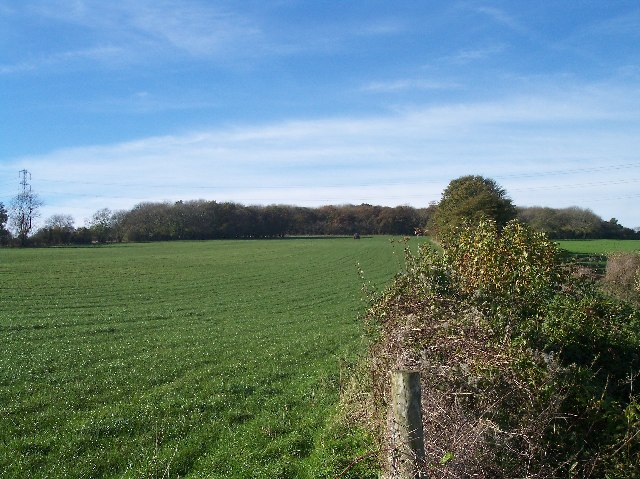
- Arle Grove from the east

- Location within Gloucestershire
- Interactive map of Arle Grove
- Type: Gloucestershire Wildlife Trust nature reserve
- Location: Dowdeswell near Whittington
- Coordinates: 51°53′33.01″N 2°0′28.6″W
- Area: 12 acres (4.9 ha)
- Created: 2009
- Operator: Gloucestershire Wildlife Trust
- Status: Open all year

Arle Grove (grid reference SO995215) is a 5-hectare (12-acre) nature reserve in Gloucestershire. The site is listed in the 'Cotswold District' Local Plan 2001–2011 as a Key Wildlife Site (KWS).

The site is owned and managed by the Gloucestershire Wildlife Trust. It was donated to the Trust as a nature reserve in 2009.

== Location and habitat ==
The reserve is an example of ancient woodland which supports a wide range of species. It is about 500 m to the north of Dowdeswell and is near Whittington. It is near a former reserve which was held under lease being Dowdeswell Reservoir and Wood. It is near the Cotswold Way national trail.

== Survey ==
Arle Grove is being surveyed to establish the full range of flora and fauna.

== Publications ==
- 'Nature Reserve Guide – discover the wild Gloucestershire on your doorstep' – 50th Anniversary, January 2011, Gloucestershire Wildlife Trust
