= Church of St Michael, Withington =

Church in Gloucestershire, England

Coordinates: 51.8392°N 1.9562°W

Church of St Michael
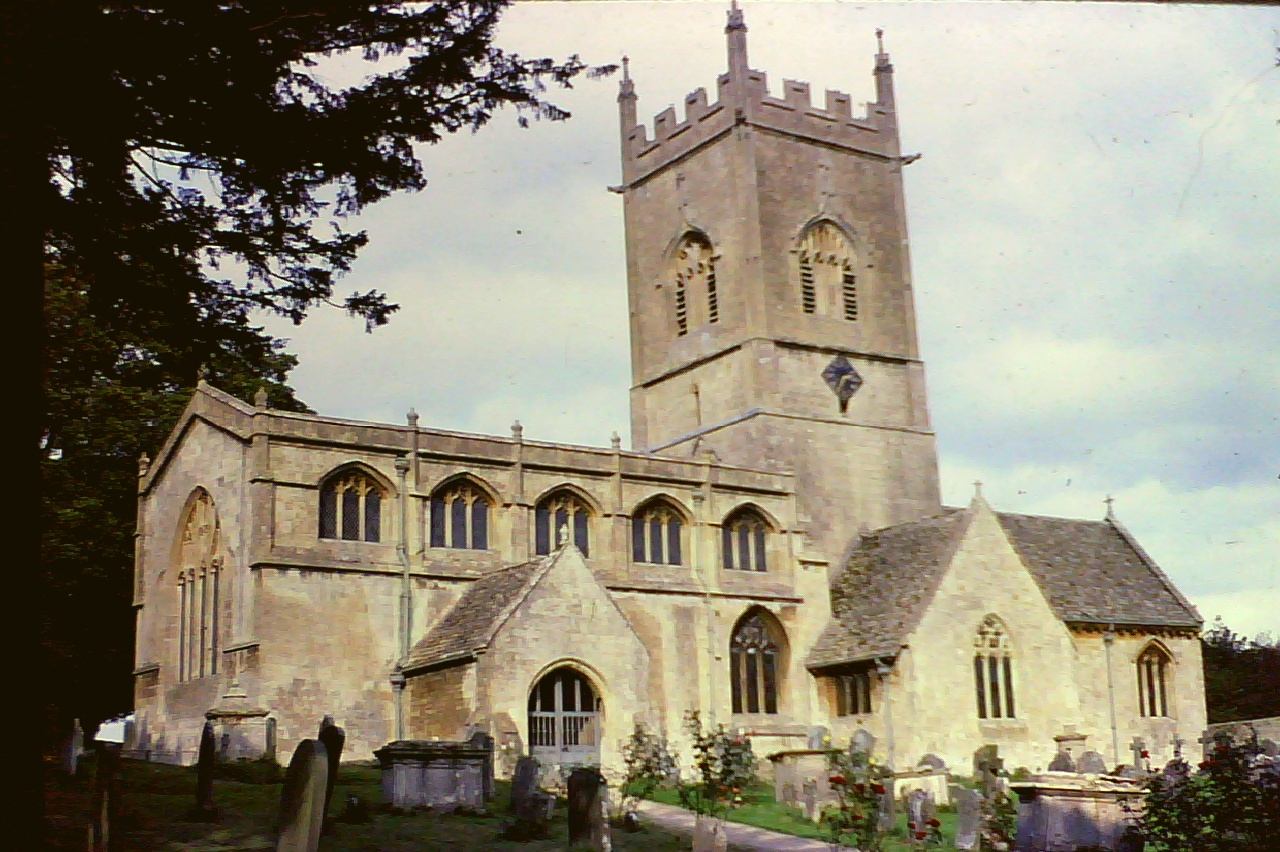

- Denomination: Church of England

Architecture
- Heritage designation: Grade I listed building
- Designated: 26 January 1961

Administration
- Province: Canterbury
- Diocese: Gloucester

The Anglican Church of St Michael at Withington in the Cotswold District of Gloucestershire, England, was built in the 12th century. It is a grade I listed building.

== History ==
Withington was the site of a Saxon monastery from 674. A resident priest was listed in the Domesday Book of 1086. The manor and patronage belonged to the Bishop of Worcester who had a summer residence in Withington.

It was rebuilt in the 12th century and a blocked Norman doorway with carving remains, and another is used to enter the church. Much of the current building is perpendicular following extensive work in the 15th century when a clerestory was added. Some minor additions were made by David Brandon in 1872.

In 2010 solar panels were installed as part of an attempt to move the church towards a zero carbon footprint. The church now claims to be the first zero-carbon church in England.

The parish is part of the Coln River benefice within the Diocese of Gloucester.

== Architecture ==
The limestone building has stone slate roofs. It consists of a nave with south porch, chancel and vestry.

The central three-stage buttressed tower has six bells and a clock with chimes. There is a 15th-century oak bell frame which supported four bells.

The font is from the 15th century.
