= Andoversford Junction railway station =

Former railway station in Gloucestershire, England

Coordinates: 51.87864°N 1.97375°W

Andoversford Junction

General information
- Location: Andoversford, Cotswold; England
- Platforms: 2

Other information
- Status: Disused

History
- Original company: Banbury and Cheltenham Direct Railway
- Pre-grouping: Great Western Railway
- Post-grouping: Great Western Railway

Key dates
- 1 June 1881: Station opens as Andoversford
- July 1926: Station renamed Andoversford Junction
- 15 October 1962: Station closes
Location

Andoversford Junction railway station was in Gloucestershire on the Great Western Railway's Banbury and Cheltenham Direct Railway that opened in 1881. Situated about six miles east of Cheltenham, the station served the village of Andoversford with its large market, which provided much of the traffic at the station.

== History ==
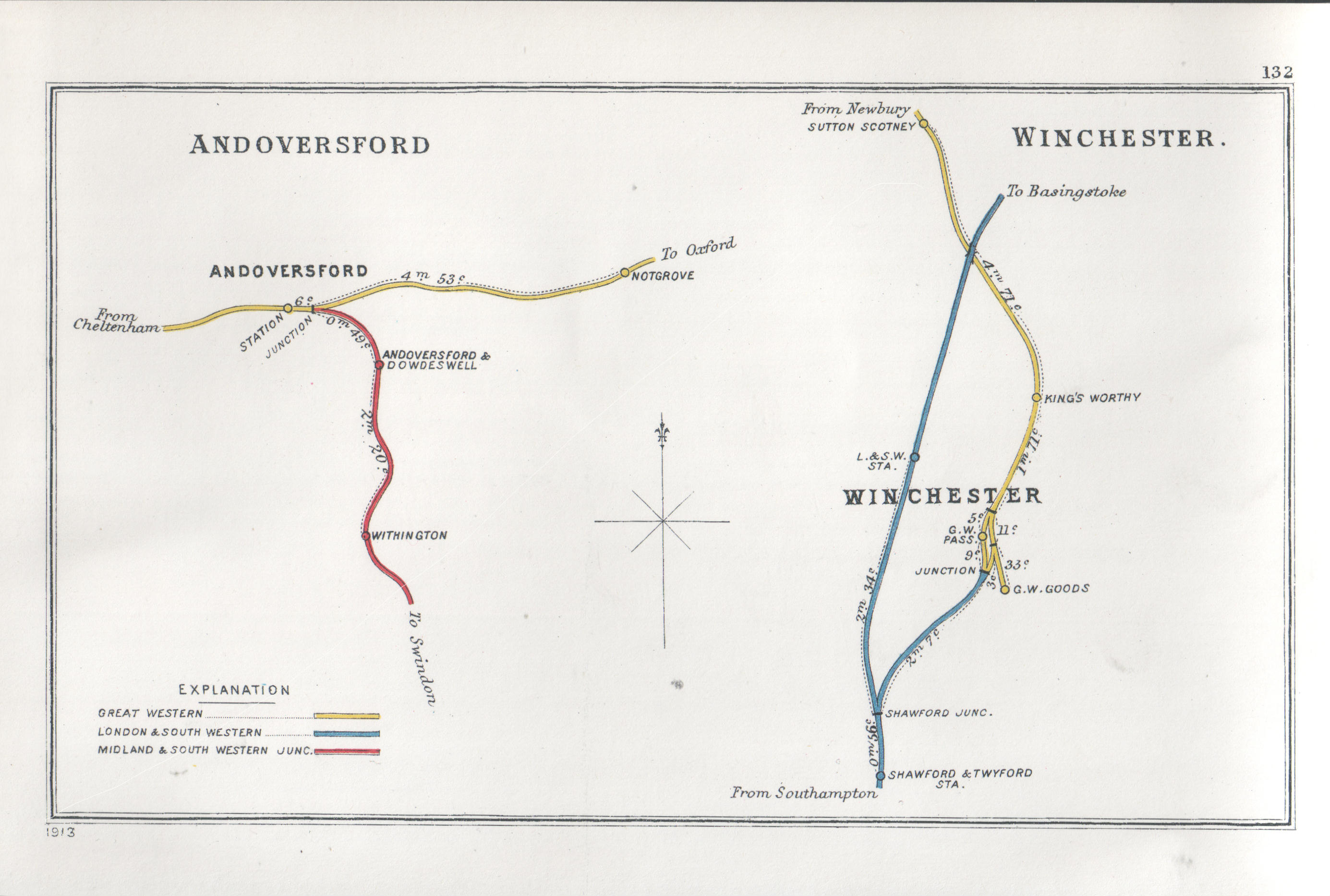
A 1913 Railway Clearing House map of railways in the vicinity of Andoversford

In 1891, the Midland and South Western Junction Railway extended its line northwards from Cirencester to a junction with the GWR Cheltenham to Banbury line just east of Andoversford station. M&SWJR trains ran into Cheltenham over the GWR tracks, but were not permitted to call at Andoversford station until 1904. The M&SWJR opened its own station, called Andoversford and Dowdeswell, on the opposite side of the village. Under the Grouping, the GWR took control of the M&SWJR; it renamed Andoversford station as Andoversford Junction in 1926 and closed Andoversford and Dowdeswell to passenger traffic the following year, though it remained open for goods.

The station passed on to the Western Region of British Railways on nationalisation in 1948. It was then closed by the British Transport Commission.

== The site today ==
The M&SWJR line closed to passengers in 1961 and the Cheltenham to Banbury line a year later. Andoversford station was demolished and housing was built on the site on a road called 'Pine Halt'.

| Preceding station | Disused railways | Following station |
|---|---|---|
| Charlton Kings; Line and station closed | Great Western Railway; Midland and South Western Junction Railway | Andoversford and Dowdeswell; Line and station closed |
| Charlton Kings; Line and station closed | Great Western Railway; Banbury and Cheltenham Direct Railway | Notgrove; Line and station closed |
