= Balcarras School =

Location
- East End Road, Charlton Kings; Cheltenham, Gloucestershire, GL53 8QF; England; 51°52′53″N 2°02′39″W

Information
- Type: Academy
- Motto: From Strength to Strength
- Established: 1986
- Department for Education URN: 136474 Tables
- Ofsted: Reports
- Head teacher: Dominic Burke
- Gender: Mixed
- Age: 11 to 18
- Enrolment: 1,354
- Capacity: 1,217
- Houses: Foley, Graveney, Selvey, Ottewell.
- Colours: Green, yellow, red and blue
- Website: http://www.balcarras.gloucs.sch.uk

Balcarras School is an academy school for 11- to 18-year-olds, located in Charlton Kings, Cheltenham, Gloucestershire, England. Since September 2016, the school's headteacher has been Dominic Burke.

The school was rated as "Outstanding" when last inspected by Ofsted in 2014.

Balcarras School is the preferred sponsor for a new secondary school in Cheltenham, named The High School Leckhampton, which opened in 2022.

In November 2020, Balcarras was named Sunday Times State School of the Decade.
