= Chedworth =

Village and civil parish in Gloucestershire, England

Coordinates: 51.8075°N 1.9254°W

- Village
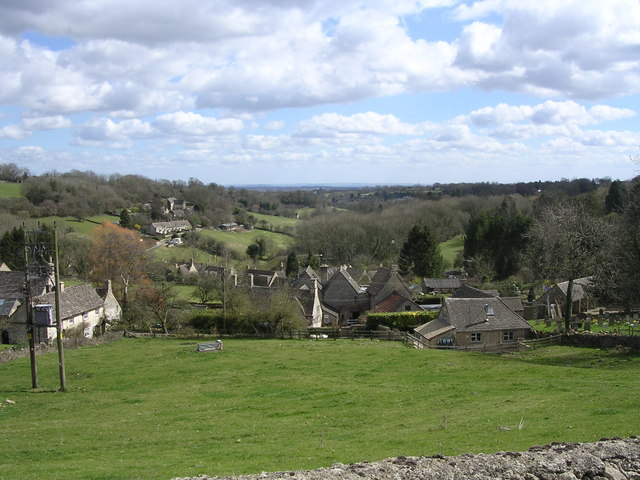
- View over Chedworth

- Location within Gloucestershire
- Population: 802 (2011)
- OS grid reference: SP051122
- Shire county: Gloucestershire
- Region: South West
- Country: England
- Sovereign state: United Kingdom
- Post town: Cheltenham
- Postcode district: GL54
- Police: Gloucestershire
- Fire: Gloucestershire
- Ambulance: South Western
- UK Parliament: North Cotswolds

Chedworth is a village and civil parish in Gloucestershire, southwest England, in the Cotswolds. It is known as the location of Chedworth Roman Villa, administered since 1924 by the National Trust.

Chedworth Stream rises close to the village and flows east for about 1.9 miles (3 km) in a narrow valley before joining the River Coln at the point where it is crossed by the ancient Fosse Way.

== Roman villa ==
The villa is a 1,700-year-old farmstead between Yanworth and Withington, about 3 1/2 miles (5.5 km) from Chedworth village by road, although it sits to the south of the River Coln and so is within Chedworth parish. It is connected with Chedworth village by two long-distance footpaths, the Macmillan Way and the Monarch's Way, both about 1 mile in walking distance. The villa was discovered by chance in 1864. It is the remains of one of the largest Romano-British villas in England, featuring several mosaics, two bathhouses, hypocausts (underfloor heating), a water-shrine and a latrine. The water shrine became very special as the Romans used it to worship the goddess of the natural spring that gives it an endless amount of water. New visitor facilities opened in 2014.

== History ==
The parish church of St Andrew is of 12th century Norman origin, but was much rebuilt in the second half of the 15th century. The south doorway has been described as "a most notable piece of rich Perpendicular work" and the south range of five Perpendicular windows has also been admired: "The interior is very charming because these great Perpendicular windows are like a wall of clear tinted glass which reflects the light onto the plastered walls."

The medieval judge and cleric Thomas de Chaddesworth, or de Chedworth, Dean of St Patrick's Cathedral, Dublin, and an unsuccessful candidate to be Archbishop of Dublin, was born here in about 1230, and took his surname from the village. He died in Ireland in 1311.

Between 1892 and 1961, the village had a railway station on the Midland and South Western Junction Railway.

In 1930, Rose Cottage in Chedworth was bought by Henry Ford, who paid for it to be dismantled and transported to Greenwich Village in Dearborn, Michigan, United States.

== Governance ==
Until the 2015 district council elections, there was an electoral ward in the same name. This ward started in the south at Chedworth and stretched north to end at Dowdeswell. The total ward population taken at the 2011 census was 1,705.

Chedworth Parish Council was formed under the Local Government Act 1894. Its first preliminary meeting was held on 4 December 1894, and the first full meeting on 3 January 1895, chaired by the Rev. Sackett Hope. Fifteen candidates stood for election to the seven seats available. Subsequently, in 1904 again 15 candidates stood for the seven seats, and none of the previous incumbents was re-elected. The Parish Council still has seven members, with the last election in 2023. The council holds monthly meetings on the second Monday of each month at the Village Hall.

== Amenities ==
The Seven Tuns Inn is close to the church at the far western, "upper" end of the village. The "tuns" are variously chimneys or barrels, both of which have featured on the pub sign at different times. It is a Grade II listed building. Chedworth had a post office and village store for over 120 years before the final postmistress, Miss Lait, closed her Fields Road establishment in 1993, leaving Chedworth with no retail outlets. Following a vigorous campaign by local residents, Chedworth Farm Shop opened in 2006, using former dairy buildings at Denfurlong Farm on Fields Road. However, the farm shop closed permanently on 27 February 2021.

== See also ==
- List of rail trails
