= Andoversford =

Village in Gloucestershire, England

Coordinates: 51.86°N 01.97°W

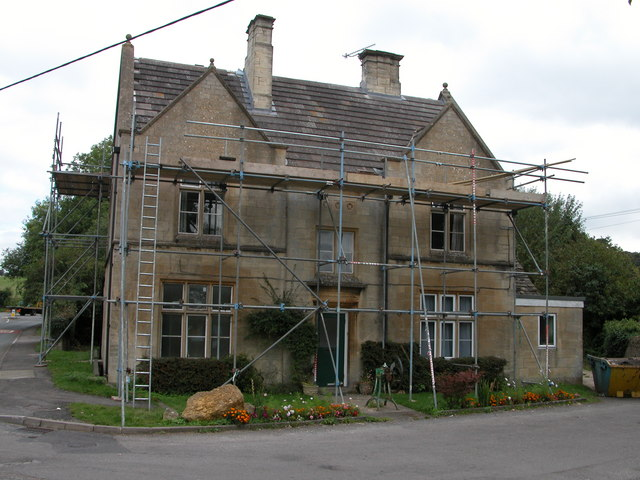
- Former Police station

- Location within Gloucestershire
- Population: 905 (2019 Est.)
- OS grid reference: SP0219
- Civil parish: Andoversford
- District: Cotswold
- Shire county: Gloucestershire
- Region: South West
- Country: England
- Sovereign state: United Kingdom
- Post town: Cheltenham
- Postcode district: GL54
- Dialling code: 01242
- Police: Gloucestershire
- Fire: Gloucestershire
- Ambulance: South Western
- UK Parliament: North Cotswolds
- Website: Andoversford Village

Andoversford is a village and civil parish in the Cotswold District of Gloucestershire, England, about 5 miles (8 km) east of Cheltenham. The village is on the River Coln, parallel to the A40.The 2011 Census recorded the parish's population as 555. In 2024 the parish had a population of 684.

== Amenities ==
Amenities include a post office, a community or village halls, a primary school, a local shop and two pubs: the (now closed for redevelopment) Kilkeney Inn and the Royal Oak. The disused livestock market has been developed into a housing estate.

As well as its own primary school, Andoversford is now in the priority catchment area for Cotswold School in Bourton-on-the-Water. Andoversford used to be in the catchment area for several schools including Balcarras. Various private schools are also within reach and is on the bus routes for the Balcarras, Cotswold and St Edward's (private) schools.

The village used to have a doctor's surgery which was a branch of the Sixways Clinic. This has now closed, and the site sold for redevelopment.

The village has several meeting areas ("pubs, schools, church, social club, playground, etc.") as well as annual events. These include village fetes, social evenings, quizzes and live music. The events are organised by the Andoversford Social Events Committee, a group formed by local residents. The village also supports a football team, a cricket team, majorettes and has Cubs and Scout groups.

There are four golf courses near Andoversford: Shipton Golf Course, Naunton Downs Golf Club, Cotswold Hills Golf Club and Lillybrook Golf Club.

== Governance ==
The parish is part of the Sandywell electoral ward of Cotswold District Council. The total ward population taken at the 2011 census was 1,829. For elections to Gloucestershire County Council, Andoversford is part of the ward of Bourton-on-the-Water and Northleach.

== Former railways ==
Two railways used to serve Andoversford. In 1881 the Banbury and Cheltenham Direct Railway opened through the parish. Andoversford railway station was just west of the village. The B&CDR was operated by the Great Western Railway.

In 1891 the Midland and South Western Junction Railway was extended north from Swindon to Andoversford. The M&SWJR opened a new Andoversford and Dowdeswell railway station south of Andoversford.

The GWR took over the M&SWJR in 1923, renamed Andoversford Station "Andoversford Junction" in 1926 and closed Andoversford and Dowdeswell to passenger traffic in 1927. In 1948 the GWR became part of British Railways, which in 1962 closed Andoversford and Dowdeswell to goods and Andoversford Junction to all traffic.
