= St Edward's School, Cheltenham =

Coordinates: 51°53′9″N 2°3′38″W

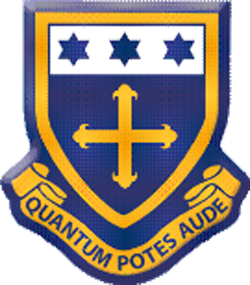
- St Edward's School, Cheltenham
- Cheltenham, Gloucestershire; England

Information
- Type: Private day school
- Motto: "Quantum Potes Aude" ("Strive for the best")
- Religious affiliation: Roman Catholic welcoming all faiths
- Established: 1987
- Head teacher: Nursery and Preparatory: Paul Fathers; Senior: Anna Sandford-Squires
- Gender: Co-educational
- Age range: Nursery: 0-4; Preparatory: 4-11; Senior: 11-18
- Enrolment: Nursery and Preparatory: ~300; Senior: ~285
- Houses: Fisher; More; Newman
- Preparatory School: Ashley Manor Preparatory School
- Website: www.ashleymanorprep.co.uk www.stedwards.co.uk

St Edward's School is a private co-educational Roman Catholic school in Cheltenham, Gloucestershire, England. It comprises three schools: a nursery school, a preparatory school, and a senior school.

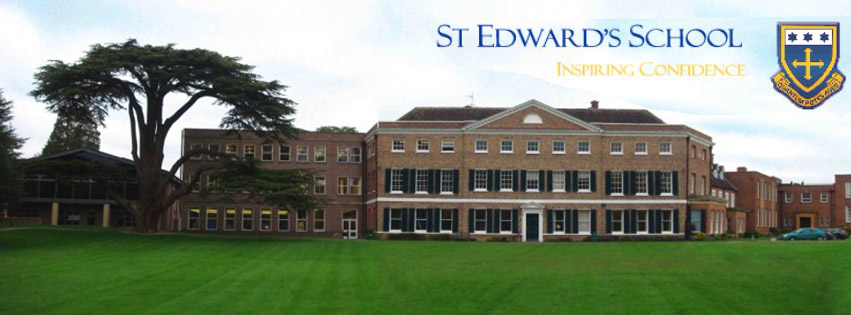
St Edward's School, Cheltenham

== History ==
The school site, Charlton Park, was a hunting lodge that belonged to Edward the Confessor (1003–1066), the only English monarch to have been canonised. The manor of Cheltenham which included Charlton was royal property – hence the local area's name, Charlton Kings – and is mentioned in the Domesday Book of 1086. Later the property was owned by a succession of families, and the original medieval manor house, known as Forden House, was rebuilt several times. It now is substantially as it was in the 18th century, though incorporating 16th-century beams and brickwork.

In 1935 the property was acquired by a religious order, the Sisters of La Sainte Union, originally from France, who established a convent in the house and added new buildings for classrooms. Charlton Park School was opened as a Roman Catholic school for girls in 1939. An area on the edge of the site was given for the building of a new Catholic parish church, Sacred Hearts, in 1957.

The need for a similar Catholic school for boys in the Cheltenham area was met in 1958 when the Carmelite order of priests and brothers acquired another historic site, Ashley Manor, less than a mile away on the London Road. Here they opened Whitefriars School. The two schools had many natural links, with families educating their sons and daughters at them. For some years Catholic children who passed their 11+ were awarded places at the schools by the local education authority. Both schools attracted many pupils of other denominations, while retaining their Catholic ethos. New buildings were added on both sites as the schools grew.

By the 1980s, the numbers of L.S.U. sisters and Carmelite friars had fallen, and both orders were leaving the field of education. The parents at Charlton Park and Whitefriars were keen that the Christian education provided in the schools should continue. A new lay-run trust was set up, and St Edward's School was created as a fully independent school. The main school (Years 7 - 13) took over the Charlton Park site, while the Whitefriars site became St Edward's Junior School (Years 1 - 6).

In 2022, St Edward's was acquired by Alpha Schools, an independent school group.

In 2023, the name of St Edward's Junior School was changed to Ashley Manor Preparatory School.

In 2024, Anna Sandford-Squires replaced Matthew Burke as headteacher of the senior school.

== Notable alumni ==
- FKA Twigs, singer, songwriter and dancer
- Pat Lavery, rugby union player
- Josh O'Connor, actor
