= Cirencester Watermoor railway station =

Former railway station in Cirencester, Gloucestershire, England

Coordinates: 51.70773°N 1.95943°W

Cirencester Watermoor
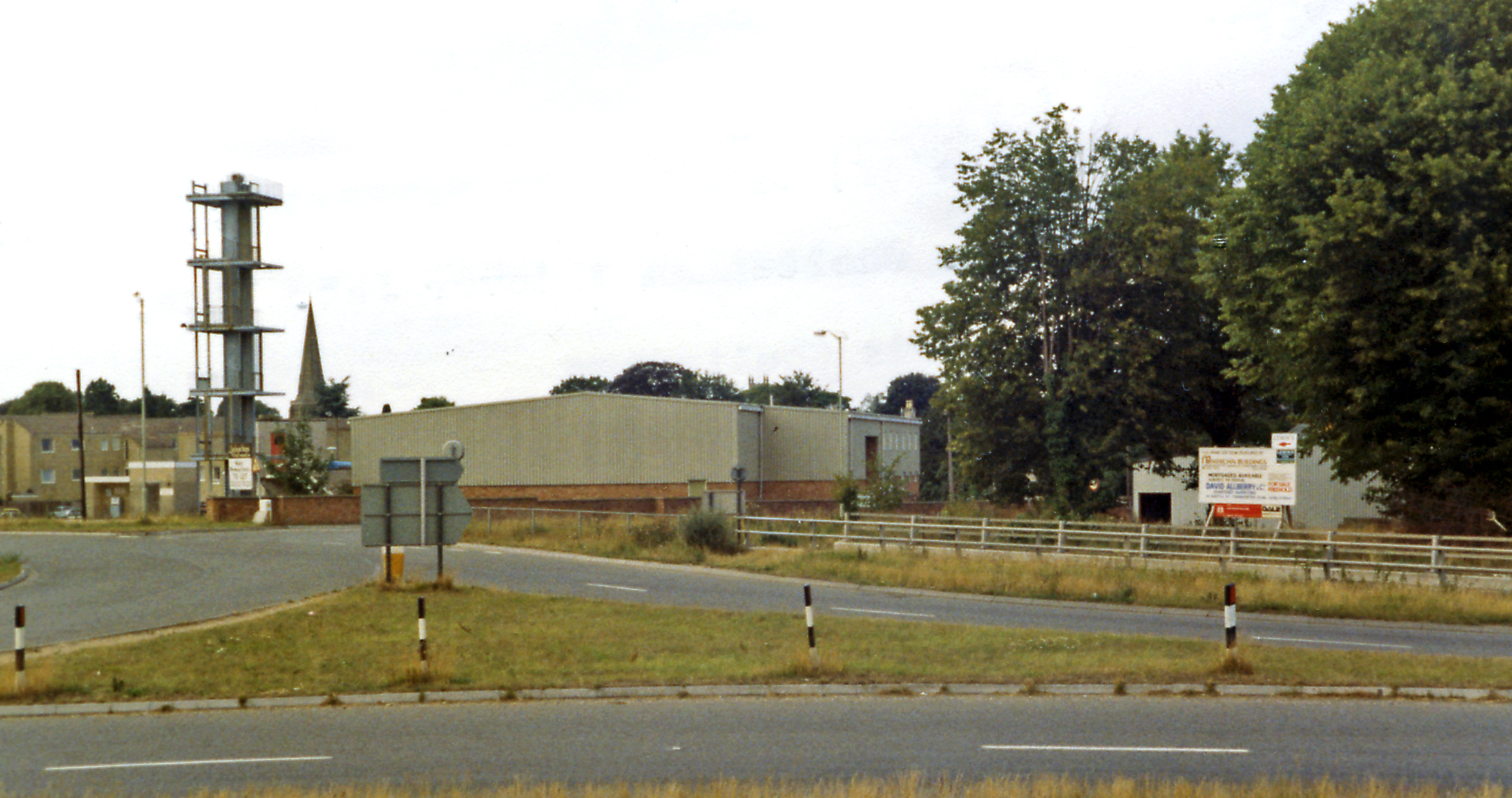
- Site of the station in 1984

General information
- Location: Cirencester, Cotswold; England
- Grid reference: SP029010
- Platforms: 2

Other information
- Status: Disused

History
- Original company: Swindon and Cheltenham Extension Railway
- Pre-grouping: Midland and South Western Junction Railway
- Post-grouping: Great Western Railway

Key dates
- 18 December 1883: Opened as Cirencester
- 1 July 1924: Renamed Cirencester Watermoor
- 11 September 1961: Closed to passengers
- 31 March 1964: closed for goods
Location

Cirencester Watermoor railway station was on the Midland and South Western Junction Railway (M&SWJR) in the town of Cirencester in Gloucestershire, England. The station opened on 18 December 1883, as the terminus of the Swindon and Cheltenham Extension Railway line from Swindon Town. That line then amalgamated with the Swindon, Marlborough and Andover Railway to form the M&SWJR. Cirencester became a through-station in 1891, with the opening of the northern extension of the line between Cirencester and the junction at Andoversford with the Great Western Railway (GWR)'s Cheltenham Lansdown to Banbury line, which had opened in 1881.

Cirencester was the biggest station on this section of the line; it was home to the M&SWJR's locomotive and wagon workshops, and a large goods yard. There was also a huge water tank, atop a stone building on the up platform, which supplied water that was loaded into rail-mounted tankers and taken to the stone-crushing plant at Foss Cross, the next station to the north.

Despite the size of the station, Cirencester Watermoor never achieved the passenger or goods traffic that was attracted by the Great Western station in the town, Cirencester Town, and its status was further diminished when, following the Grouping of 1923, the M&SWJR line was allocated to the GWR, which promptly closed the workshops. The station was named "Cirencester Watermoor" from 1924 to distinguish it from the other station.

Passenger and goods traffic on the M&SWJR fell steeply after the Second World War and the line closed to passengers in 1961, with goods facilities being withdrawn in March 1964. No trace of the station now remains.

== Route ==
Preceding station	Disused railways	Following station
Foss Cross	Midland and South Western Junction Railway; Swindon & Cheltenham Extension Railway	Cerney and Ashton Keynes
