= Samuel Lysons =

English antiquarian and engraver (1763–1819)

Samuel Lysons FSA FRS
- Portrait by Thomas Lawrence

Keeper of the Records in the Tower of London
- In office 1803–1819
- Preceded by: Thomas Astle
- Succeeded by: Henry Petrie

Director of the Society of Antiquaries of London
- In office 1798–1809

Personal details
- Born: 1763 Rodmarton, Gloucestershire, England
- Died: June 1819 (aged 55–56)
- Relations: Daniel Lysons (brother); Revd Samuel Lysons (nephew)
- Profession: Barrister; antiquarian; engraver

Samuel Lysons FSA FRS (1763 – June 1819) was an English antiquarian and engraver who, together with his elder brother Daniel Lysons (1762–1834), published several works on antiquarian topics. He was one of the first archaeologists to investigate Roman sites in Britain, and specialised in the study of mosaics.

== Origins ==
He was born at Rodmarton near Cirencester, Gloucestershire, the younger son of the Reverend Samuel Lysons (1730–1804) by his wife Mary Peach of Minchinhampton. His elder brother was Daniel Lysons (1762–1834), his collaborator in much of his work.

== Career ==
In November 1786, Lysons was elected a fellow of the Society of Antiquaries. He studied law at Bath in Somerset and was called to the Bar at the Inner Temple in 1798. Having chosen the Oxford Circuit, he practised law until December 1803. He served as director of the Society of Antiquaries of London from 1798 to 1809. He was elected a Fellow of the Royal Society in 1797 and later served as vice-president and treasurer (1810–1819) of the Society. Shortly before he died, he also served as antiquary professor in the Royal Academy. His portrait was painted by, among others, Academicians Sir Thomas Lawrence and George Dance the Younger.

From 1803 until his death in 1819 he was Keeper of the Records in the Tower of London, then one of the principal storage sites for historic government documents and other archives until the opening in 1838 of the Public Record Office in Chancery Lane (now The National Archives, Kew). He wrote the descriptions for Cadell & Davies' version of Britannia Depicta.

== Death ==
Lysons died in June 1819, near Rodmarton, Cirencester, Gloucestershire, his birthplace.

== Works ==
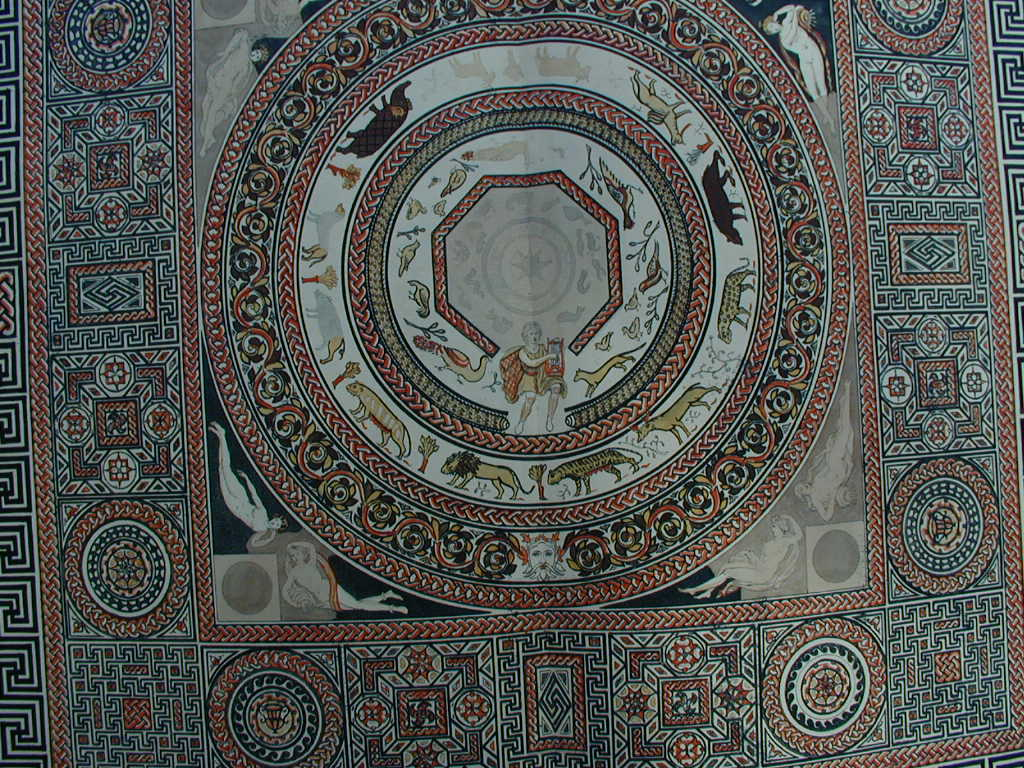
Samuel Lysons' drawing of the Orpheus mosaic at Woodchester (detail)

Samuel Lysons' works included:

- Environs of London, illustrated by Samuel Lysons, written by Daniel Lysons.
- Magna Britannia, Being a Concise Topographical Account of the Several Counties of Great Britain, written by both Samuel and Daniel, published in several volumes from 1806 to 1822 including:
  - Volume 6: Devon, 1822
- Reliquae Britannico-Romanae (1801–1817), in which 156 plates were engraved by Samuel.
- Views and Antiquities of the County of Gloucestershire (1791), relating to his native county, for which he produced plates.
- A Collection of Gloucestershire Antiquities (1803), for which he produced plates.
- An Account of the Remains of a Roman Villa Discovered at Woodchester in the County of Gloucestershire (1815), written by Samuel. This included descriptions of his discovery of the Orpheus mosaic at Woodchester Roman Villa in 1793.
- Several works on Roman mosaics, including papers in Archaeologia, published by the Society of Antiquaries in London.
