= Woodchester Roman Villa =

Roman villa in Gloucestershire, England

Coordinates: 51.7266°N 2.2336°W

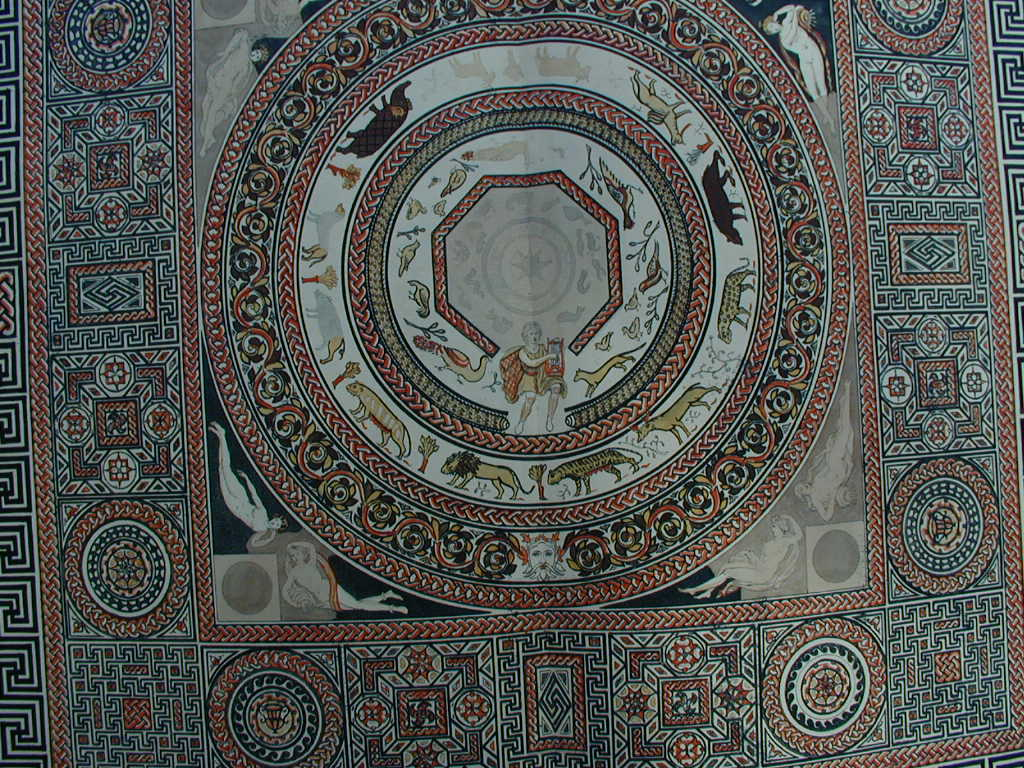
Samuel Lysons' drawing of the Orpheus mosaic (detail)

Woodchester Roman Villa was situated at Woodchester near Stroud in the English county of Gloucestershire.

It is one of many Roman villas discovered in Gloucestershire and was occupied between the early 2nd and late 4th centuries AD. There is now nothing visible of the villa above ground and the site is occupied by a later churchyard. The villa's most famous feature is the Orpheus mosaic, the second largest of its kind in Europe and one of the most intricate. It dates to c. AD 325 and was re-discovered by Gloucestershire-born antiquarian Samuel Lysons in 1793. It has been uncovered seven times since 1880, the last time in 1973, but there are no plans to reveal it again. It depicts Orpheus charming all forms of life with his lyre and has been praised for its accuracy and beauty.

A replica mosaic, made of more than one-and-a-half million pieces of stone, was created by brothers John and Bob Woodward, who were inspired after seeing the original pavement. The replica was displayed at Prinknash Abbey in Gloucester, England before being auctioned in June 2010 for £75,000.
