= Abraham Temple =

Synagogue in Gaza, Palestine

- Hebrew: היכל אברהם; Arabic: معبد ابراهيم

Religion
- Affiliation: Judaism
- Ecclesiastical or organisational status: Synagogue
- Status: Active

Location
- Location: Gaza City
- Country: Palestine

Architecture
- Founder: Unknown Palestinian (prior to conversion); Israel Defense Forces (after conversion)
- Completed: 2023

The Abraham Temple synagogue (Hebrew: היכל אברהם, romanized: hykl ʾbrhm; Arabic: معبد ابراهيم, romanized: Maʻbad Ibrāhīm) is an improvised Jewish place of worship located in an existing building in the Gaza Strip in Palestine.

== History ==
A building was converted into a synagogue during the Israeli invasion of the Gaza Strip as part of the Gaza war. The synagogue provided a way for soldiers of the IDF to pray amidst their invasion into the Gaza Strip.

Before the establishment of the synagogue, soldiers prayed in the Gaza synagogue, which was established in the 6th century during the time of the Byzantine Empire.

== See also ==
- Gaza synagogue
- History of the Jews in Gaza
