= Gaza synagogue =

Ancient synagogue in Gaza Strip, Palestine

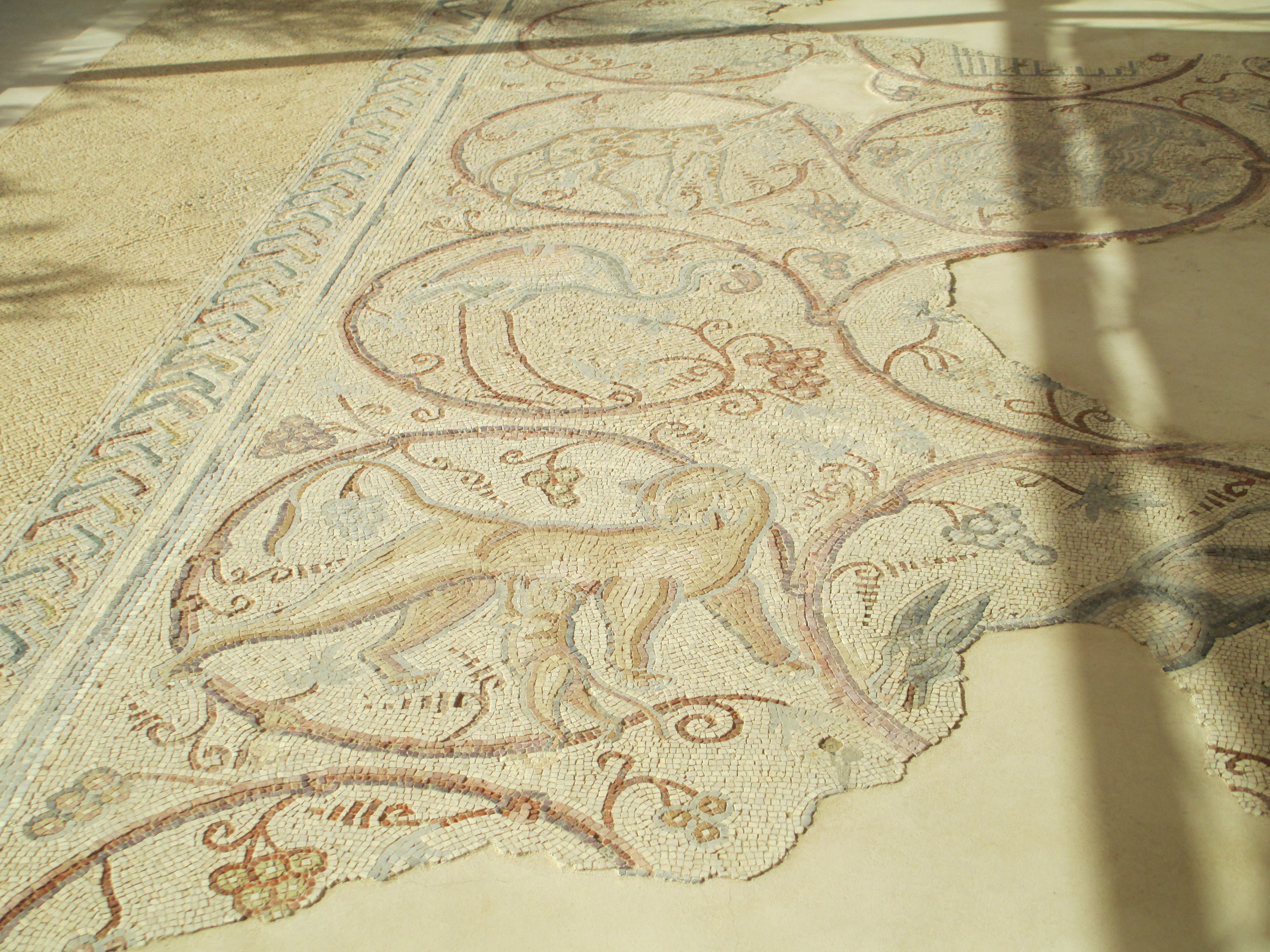
- Section of the synagogue's mosaic floor on display at the Museum of the Good Samaritan

- Location within Gaza City
- 31°31′13.92″N 34°25′57.17″E
- Type: Ancient synagogue; archeological site
- Periods: Byzantine
- Cultures: Hellenistic Judaism
- Location: Rimal, Gaza City, Palestine
- Part of: City of Maiumas, Palaestina Prima, Byzantine Empire

History
- Built: 508–509 (date on mosaic)
- Abandoned: First half of the 7th century (burnt)

Site notes
- Archaeologists: 'Abd el-Mohsen el-Khashab (1965), Asher Ovadiah (1967, 1976)
- Condition: Ruins

The Gaza synagogue was an ancient Jewish synagogue, now an archaeological site in the Rimal district of Gaza City, Palestine. Built in the early 6th century during the Byzantine period, it was destroyed by fire in the first half of the 7th century. It was located in the ancient port city of Gaza, then known as Maiumas. The archaeological remains of the former synagogue were discovered in 1965 during the Egyptian occupation of Gaza. The 6th-century mosaics that led to the identification of the building as a synagogue were removed and later displayed, first at the Israel Museum and then in the Museum of the Good Samaritan.

== History ==
The synagogue was built over an earlier structure that was destroyed in a fire; it is uncertain whether the fire was part of a larger destructive episode which affected Gaza Maiuma in the late 5th century or was an isolated event.

The construction of the building likely took several years. A Greek inscription in one of the mosaics dated 508–509 and likely indicates when the pavement was completed. Asher Ovadiah, who excavated the site in 1967, suggested that this may have been when the building was completed. It is one of three mosaics that contain dates from synagogues in Palestine. During its use, the mosaic floors were partially replaced by marble slabs. Pottery from the late 6th and early 7th centuries was recovered from the later phases of the site. The synagogue was burned, likely in the first half of the 7th century; Ovadiah suggested that this could have coincided with the Sassanian or Arab conquests of the region.

== Rediscovery and investigation ==
In 1965, 'Abd el-Mohsen el-Khashab led excavations in Gaza on behalf of the Egyptian Department of Antiquities. During the work they uncovered the remains of a structure they interpreted as a 5th-century church. It contained two mosaics with inscriptions in Greek and Hebrew; one of them featured a seated figure, thought to be a saint, with a harp. In contrast, archaeologist Michael Avi-Yonah interpreted the site as a synagogue based on the contents of the mosaics: Jewish names; the use of the phrase "the most holy site"; the seated figure with a lyre was labelled in Hebrew as 'David' and depicted in imperial clothing and therefore thought to be King David in the style of a depiction of Orpheus. Historian Marc Philonenko came to the same conclusion based on similar reasoning.

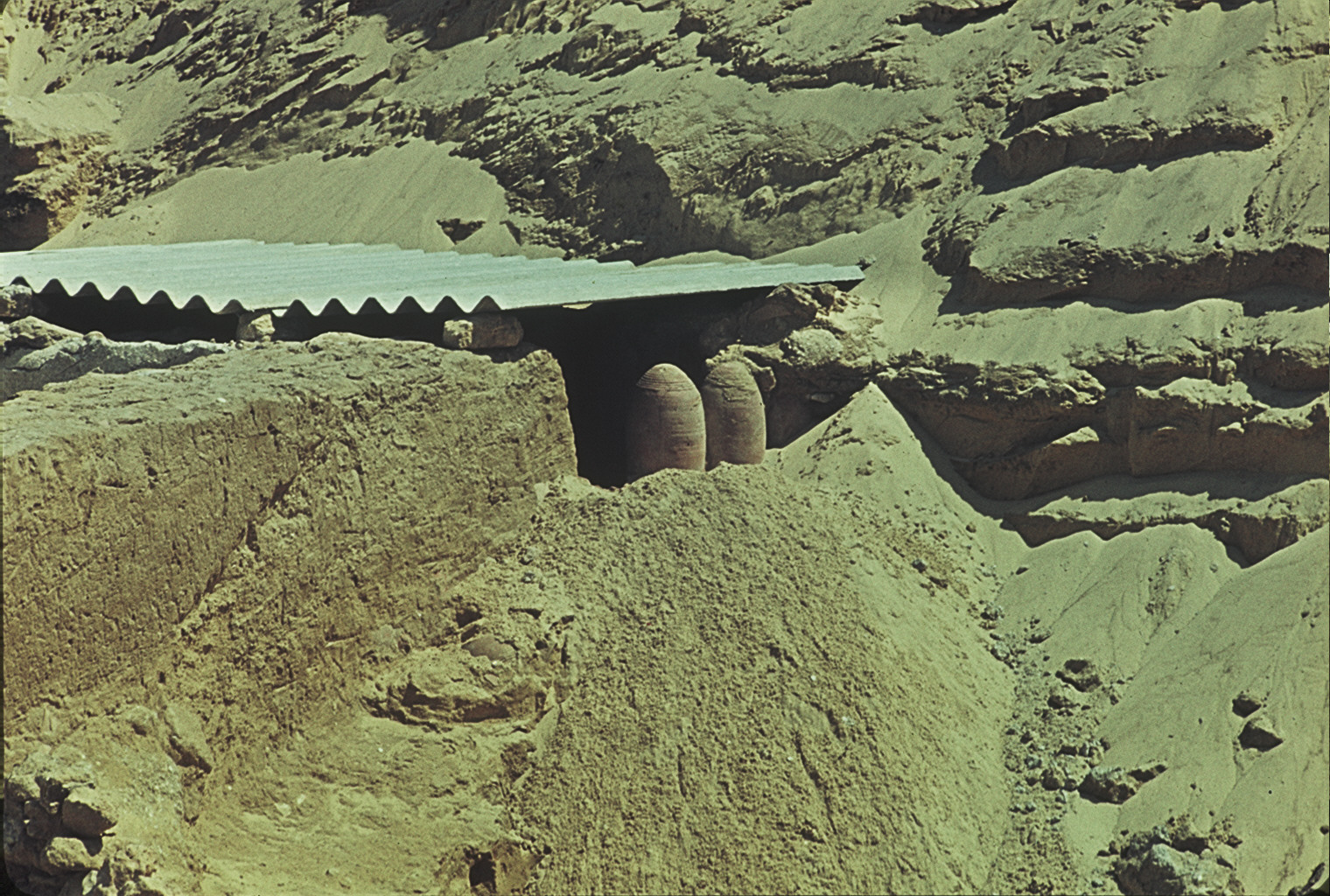
The site in the late 1960s

Following Israel's capture of the Gaza Strip in the June 1967 Six-Day War, Asher Ovadiah carried out further excavations on the site for the Israel Department of Antiquities and Museums (IDAM) in August and September that year. By that time the mosaic of David had been damaged, with the loss of David's face and left hand. An industrial complex covering an area of up to 300 square metres (3,200 sq ft) west of the synagogue was also excavated; the structure had been destroyed by fire in antiquity; the excavator suggested that it was a dyeworks and dated to the 5th century. Ovadiah carried out more excavations in 1976 which discovered that the synagogue was built over an earlier building which had been destroyed in a conflagration. The work also found evidence that the synagogue had been burned in its final period of use.

In 1974, the IDAM removed the mosaic featuring David and transferred it to the Israel Museum; three decades later the deputy director of IDAM was uncertain why the mosaic was removed, saying "Maybe there was an intention then to return it, but it didn't work out! I don't know why." The mosaic was kept in storage, away from public view until the 1990s; in 1992 the museum began preparing the mosaic for display. The mosaic was cleaned and the damaged area where David's head had been was replaced based on black and white photographs.

When the Museum of the Good Samaritan near the Israeli settlement of Ma'ale Adumim in the West Bank opened in 2009 it featured mosaics from the Gaza synagogue near the entrance, and a replica of the David mosaic.

The synagogue was closed c. 2005, and Jews were forbidden from worshipping at the site. During the Israeli invasion of Gaza as part of the Gaza war, the synagogue was briefly used as a place of worship by IDF soldiers, prior to the establishment of the improvised Abraham Temple in November 2023.

== Description ==
=== Architecture ===
The basilica-style synagogue measured 26 by 23 metres (85 by 75 ft) and had three entrances. The synagogue's floorplan was almost square and was aligned east–west. Internally it was divided into five parts divided by columns: a central nave flanked by two aisles on each side, which were paved with mosaics.

=== Mosaic floor ===
Part of the inscription used to date the synagogue

The mosaic decorating the floor of the southernmost aisle was dated to 508–509 and measured 3 meters (9.8 ft) long by 1.9 meters (6.2 ft) wide. Translated from Greek the central inscription of the mosaic read:

We, Menachem and Yeshua, sons of the late Yishay, wood merchants, as a sign of admiration for the most holy site, donated this mosaic in the month of Luos, year 569

This corresponds to approximately July–August of the year 508; the census of the Jews of Gaza began with the expulsion of Gavinius, during the reign of Pompey, in 61 BCE.

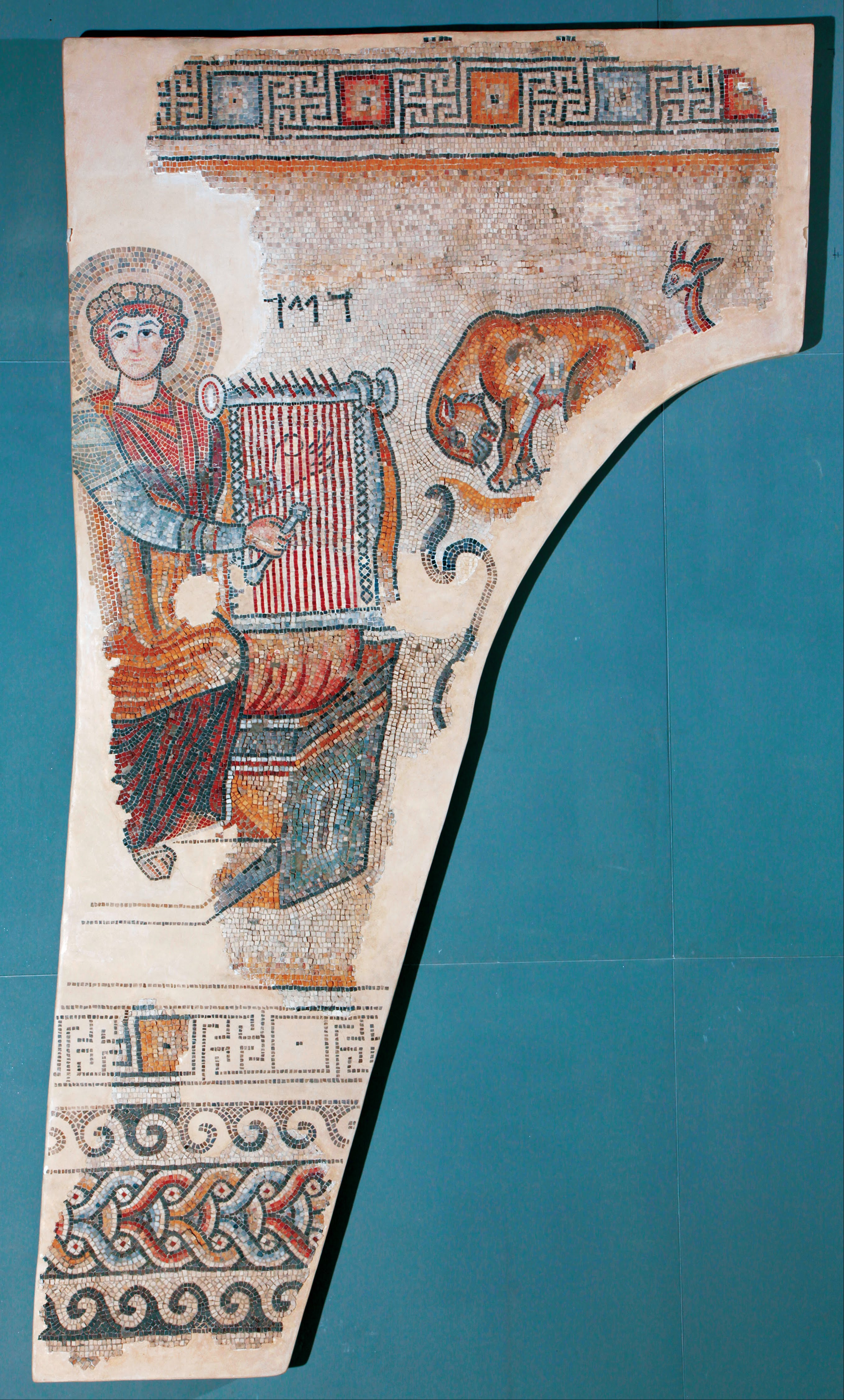
King David playing the lyre on display in the Israel Museum

The mosaic on the floor of the nave depicted King David bordered by geometric patterns. The mosaic originally extended further but was partly replaced by paving slabs. The mosaic has a Hebrew inscription reading "David" (דויד), while sitting and playing a lyre with a number of wild animals listening tamely in front of him. The iconography is a clear example of David being depicted in the posture of the legendary Greek musician Orpheus. Philonenko compared the composition to a mosaic at Dura-Europos in which Orpheus is depicted with a lyre and animals. David's head is surrounded by a halo, which Avi-Yonah drew a parallel with a depiction of Abraham in a mosaic at Beth Alpha.

The design of the mosaics found at the Gaza synagogue are similar to those at the broadly contemporary Maon synagogue and the church at Shelal so they may have been created by the same artists. The yellow glass in the border of the mosaic is the same type used in the mosaics at Saint Hilarion Monastery.

== See also ==
- Ancient synagogues in Palestine - covers entire Palestine region/Land of Israel
- Hellenistic Judaism
- History of the Jews in Gaza
- Jewish Christianity
- List of archaeological sites in the Gaza Strip
- Synagogal Judaism
- Therapeutae
