= Convent of Poor Clares, Woodchester =

Convent in Woodchester, Stroud, Gloucestershire, England

Coordinates: 51.7112°N 2.2345°W

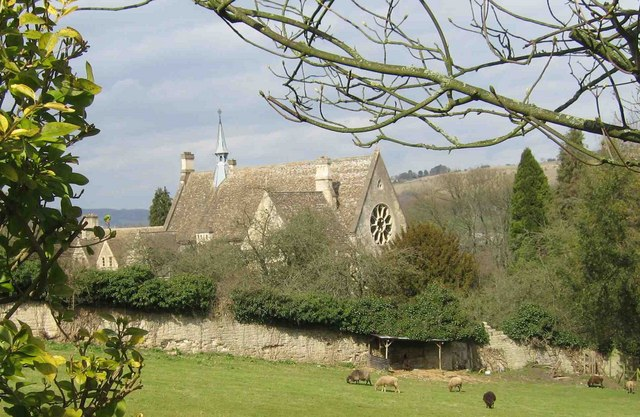
The convent chapel

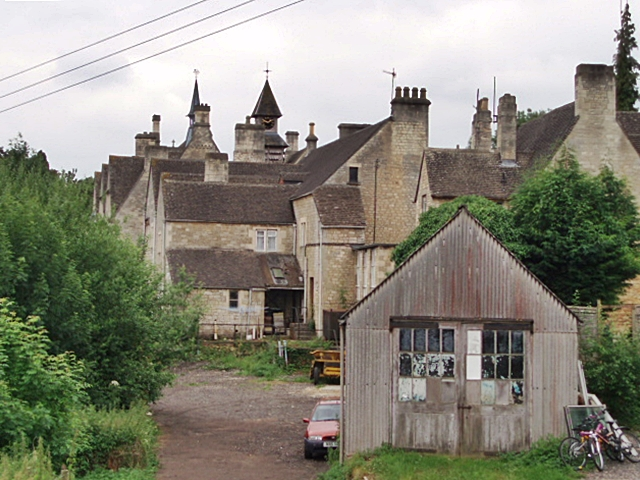
Former Convent of Poor Clares

A former Convent of Poor Clares is located in Woodchester, near Stroud in Gloucestershire. The convent was home to nuns of the Poor Clares order from 1850 to 2011.

The convent is based around a 17th-century house that was enlarged in the 1850s. The dedicated convent buildings were built between 1861 and 1869 by Charles Francis Hansom. A separate guest house was built around 1870 by Canon Scoles.

The convent is Grade II listed on the National Heritage List for England. The convent originally belonged to a Franciscan order before its adoption by the Poor Clares.

Five sisters of the Poor Clares order remained at the convent's dissolution; they subsequently moved to a Poor Clares convent in Lynton, North Devon.

Poor Clares exiled from France in 1904 joined Franciscan nuns at Woodchester. The convent at Woodchester was built in the 1860s; at its zenith, the convent housed 30 nuns after the Second World War, but it had declined to 12 mostly elderly nuns by 1998.

Duff Hart-Davis visited the convent for a 1998 article in The Independent on Sunday and met the Mother Abbess, Sister Mary Anthony, and a Sister Mary Therese. Hart-Davis reported that the nuns' primary source of income was the production of altar breads, of which they made five million a year, earning them £25,000. The nuns also had a vegetable garden and an orchard and kept bees, cows, and chickens. Hart-Davis also wrote about the nuns' Christmas celebrations and reported that they did not have a television, but borrowed one for Christmas and Easter.

The Poor Clares donated their library from the Woodchester convent to Durham University Library. Durham's holdings comprise 485 titles from the Woodchester Convent, dating from the 16th to the 19th century, with the majority of books from the Poor Clares convent in Princehof near Bruges. The books are mostly devotional in nature.

Since the convent's closure, the buildings have been used as a boutique hotel, restaurant and live music venue.
