= Littlecote Roman Villa =

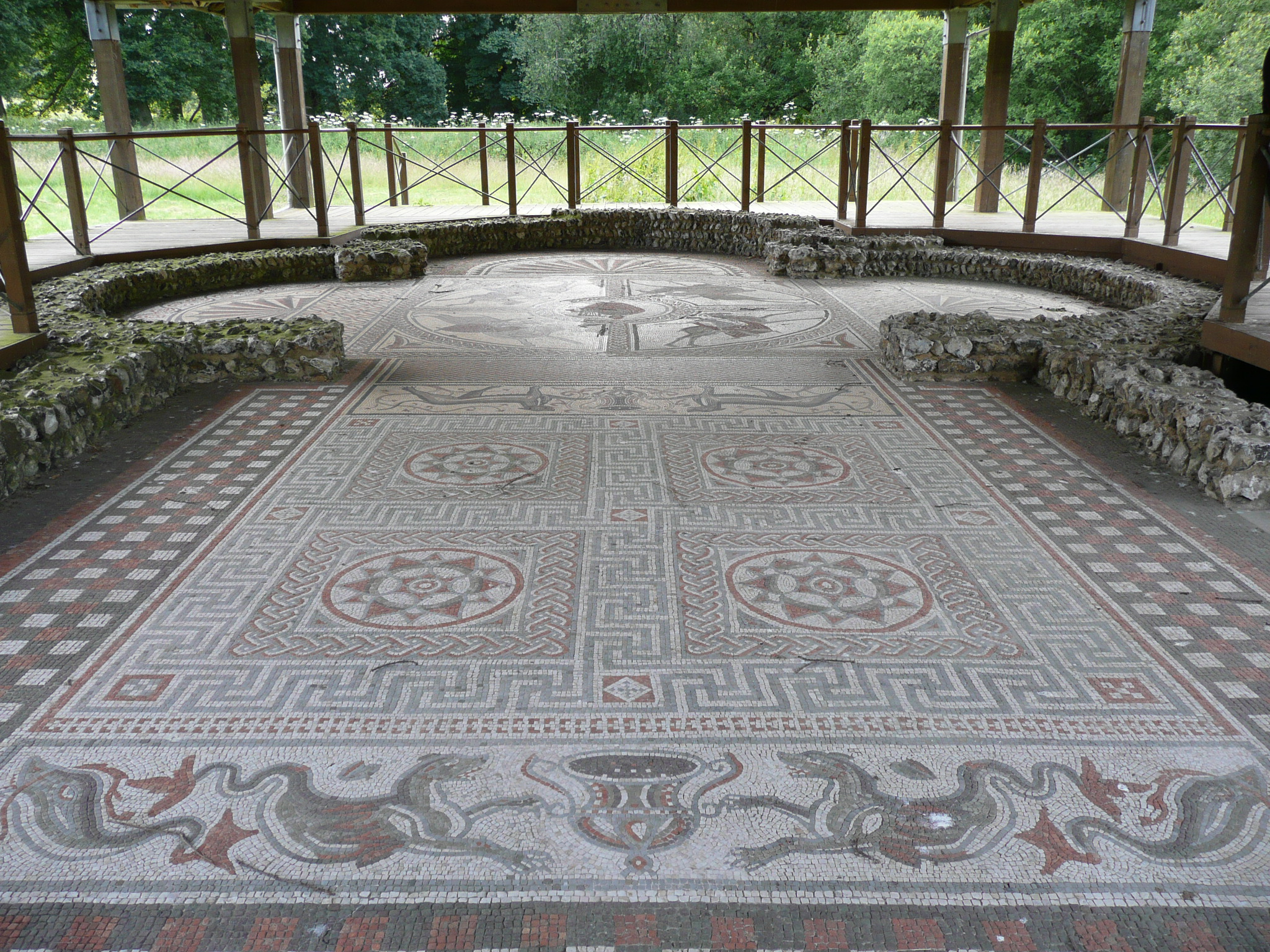
- The Orpheus mosaic

- Location within Wiltshire

General information
- Location: Hungerford
- Coordinates: 51.43333°N 1.56963°W
- Construction started: 1st century
- Demolished: c. 420

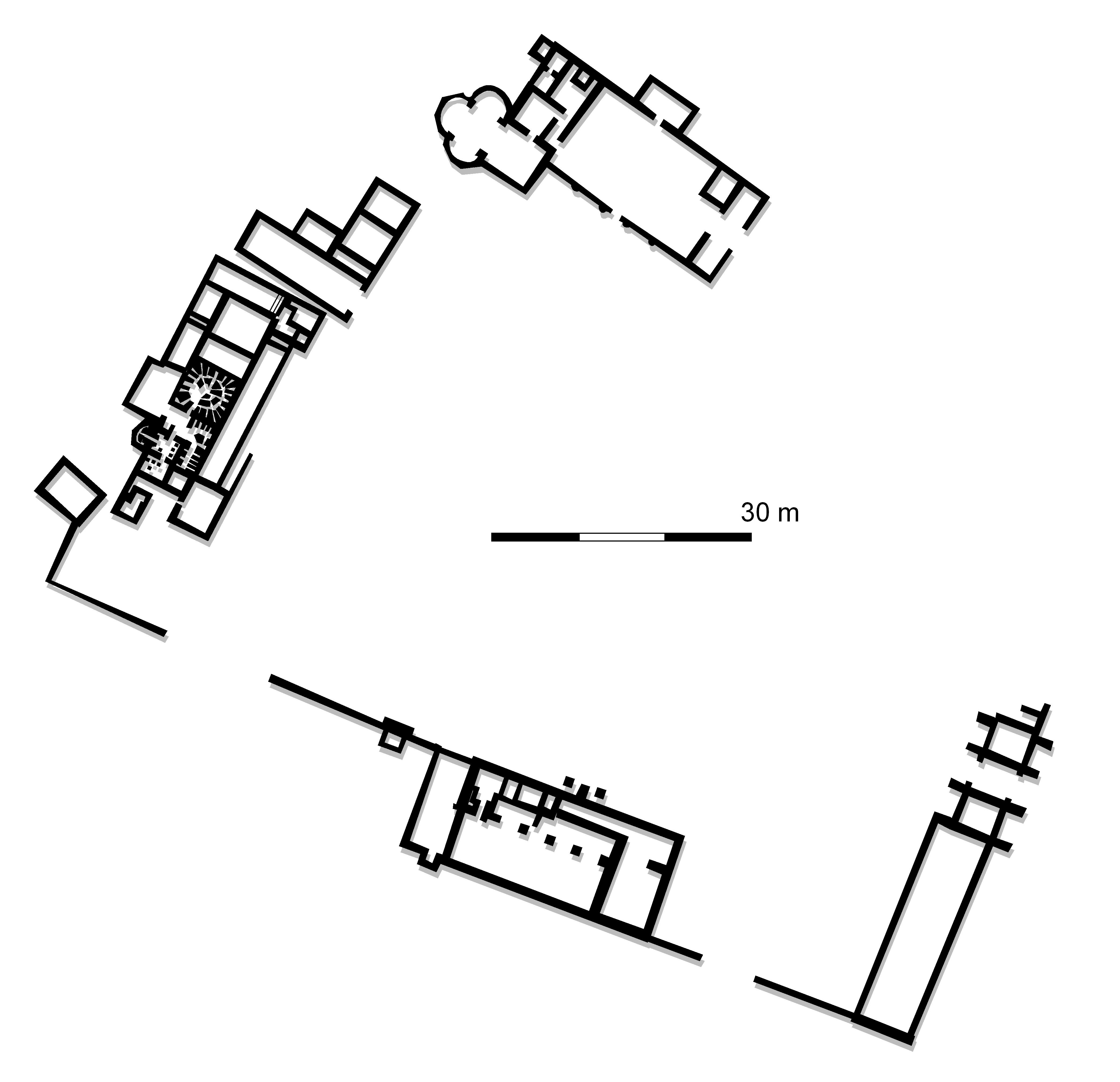
Plan of the villa

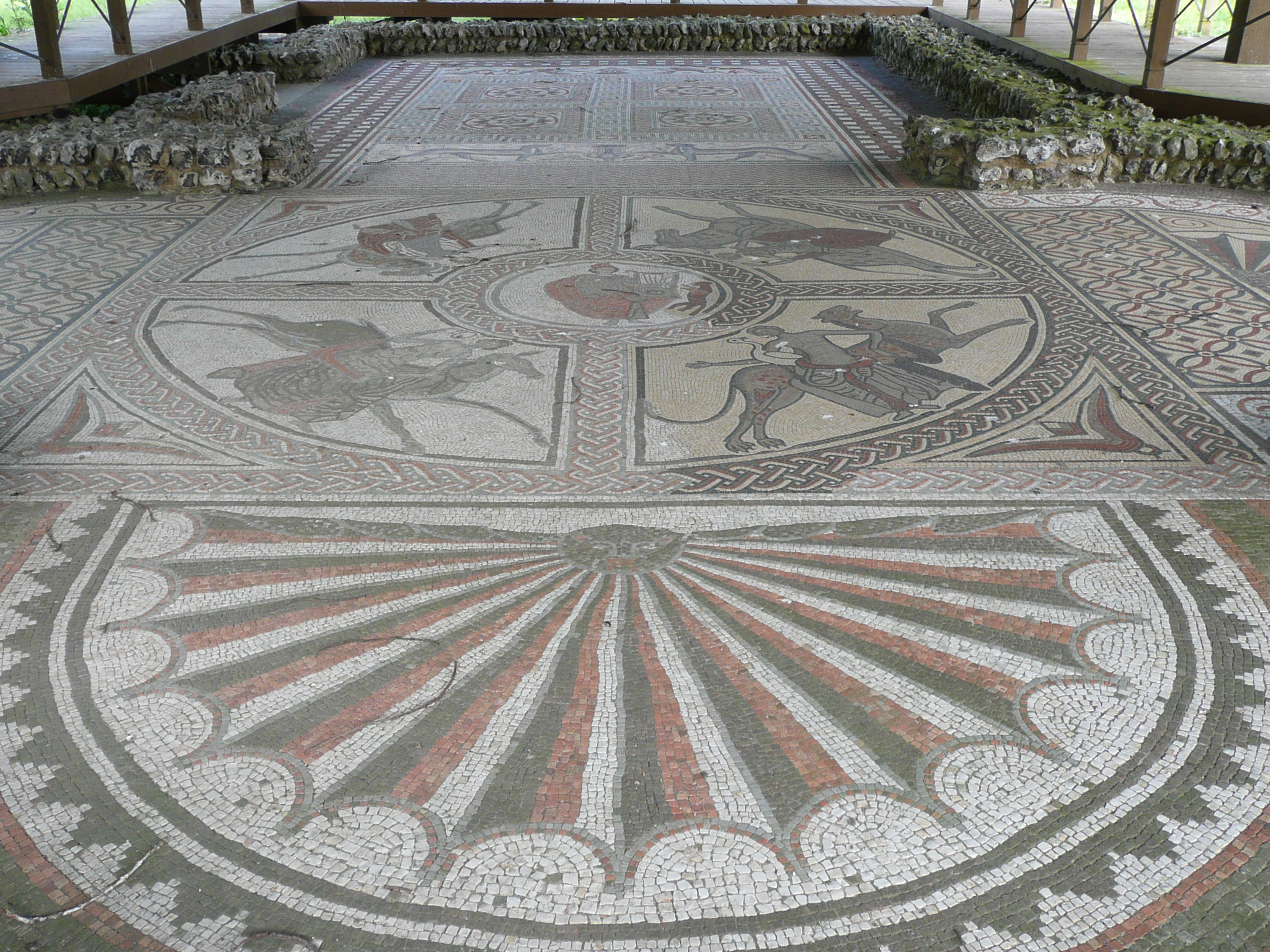
The Orpheus mosaic

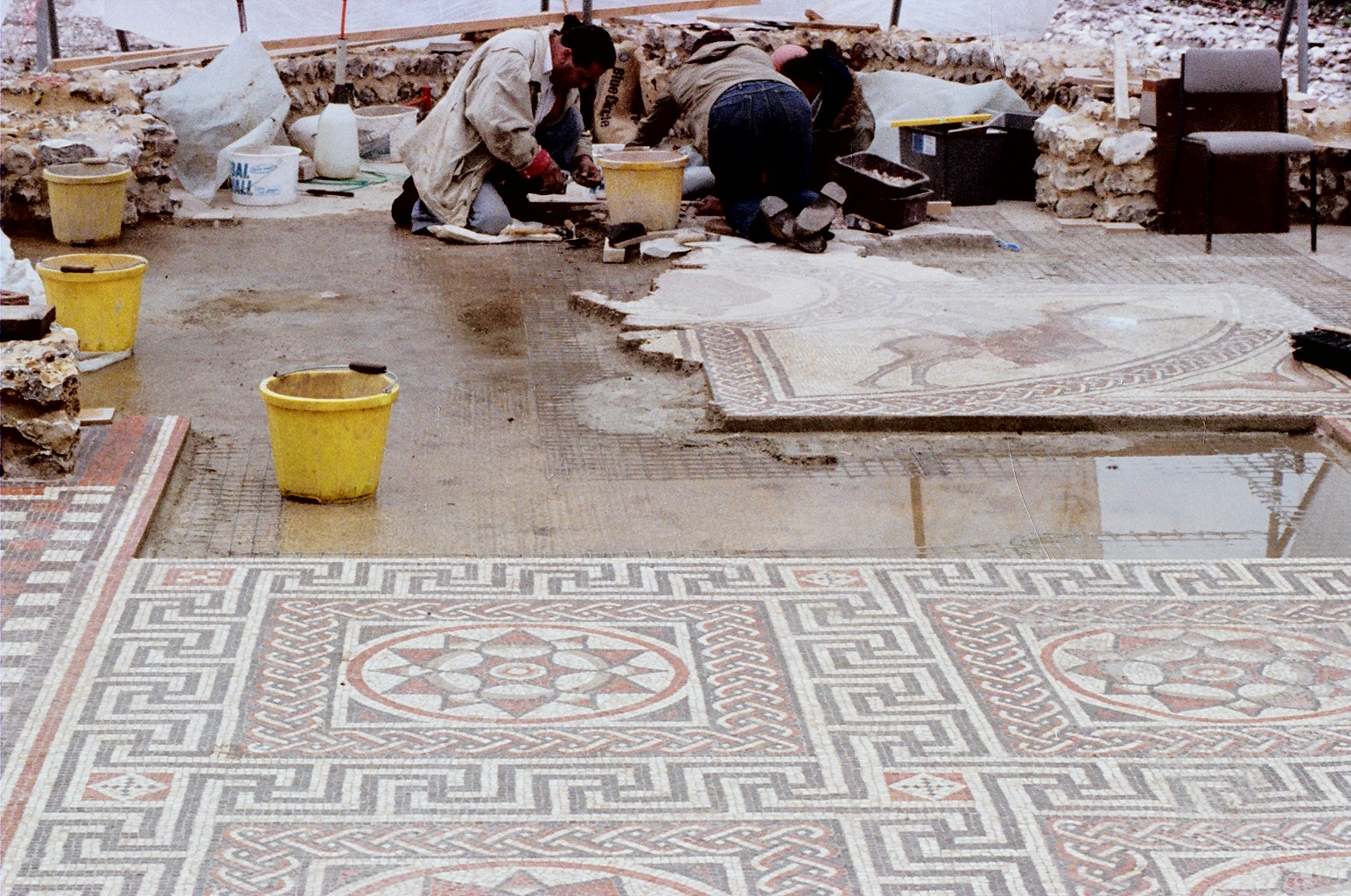
Littlecote mosaic restoration in 1979

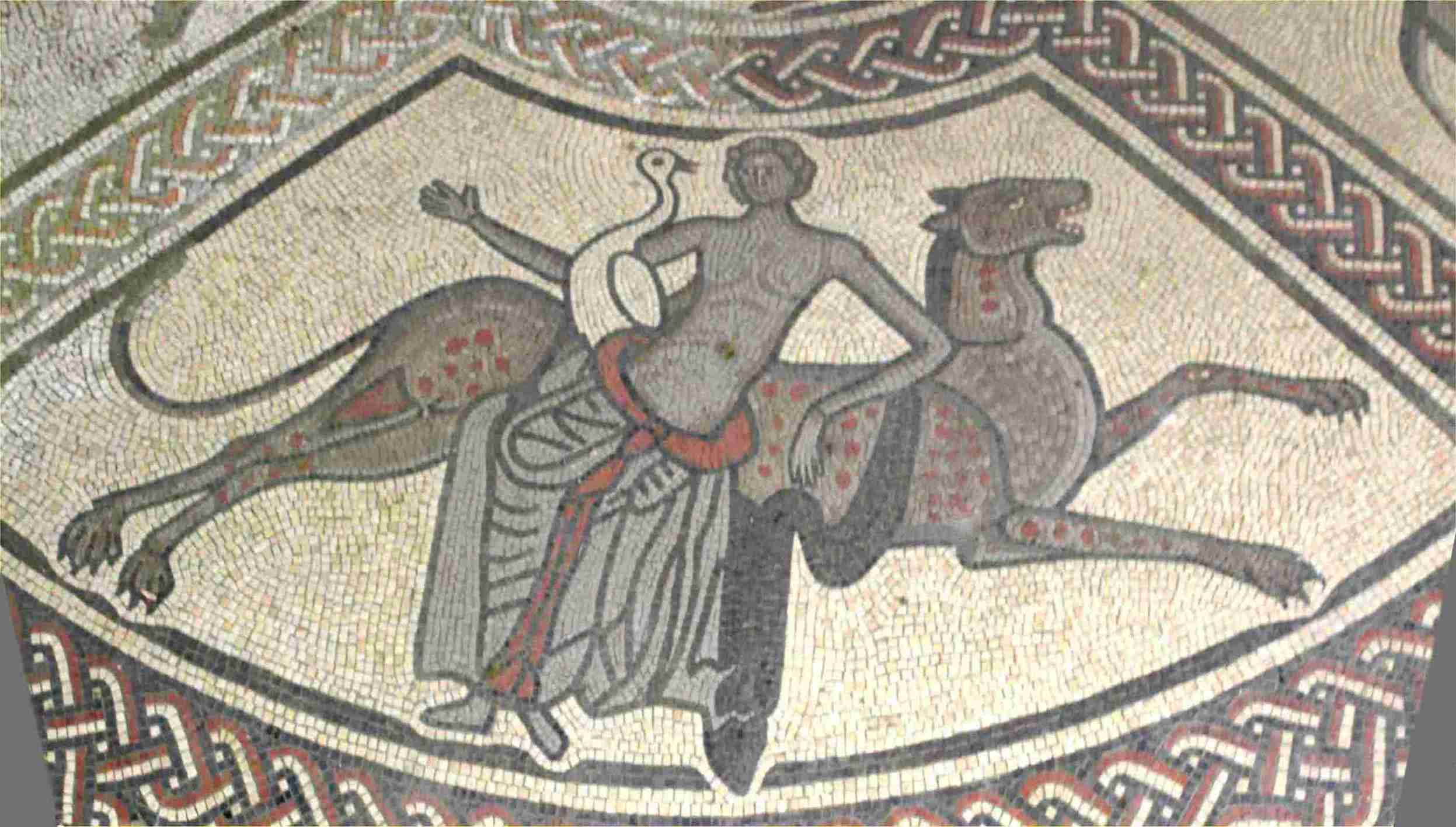
Littlecote mosaic - Horse, Man and Bird

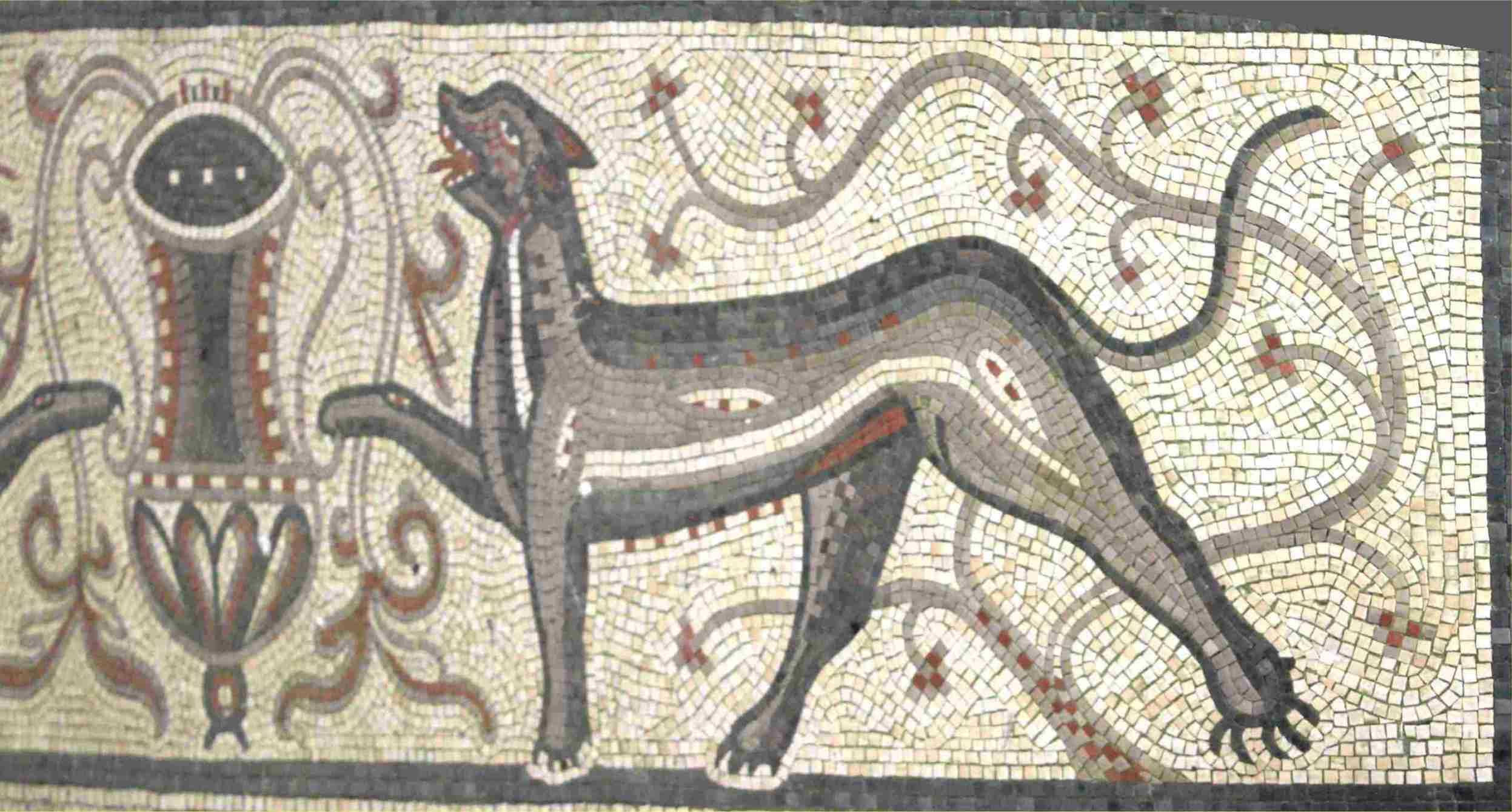
Littlecote mosaic - Animal and Urn

Littlecote Roman Villa is an extensive and exceptional Roman villa, with associated religious complex, at Littlecote Park just over a mile west of Hungerford, Berkshire. It has been excavated and is on display to the public in the grounds of the estate.

It was situated 8 km (5.0 mi) east of the Roman town of Cunetio towards Marlborough.

== Discovery and excavation ==
In 1727–1728 William George discovered the Orpheus mosaic whilst digging post-holes, and it was reported as "the finest pavement that the sun ever shone upon in England". An engraving and drawing were made and the villa was reburied. Its location disappeared from memory. It was rediscovered in 1976 and the mosaic fully restored by 1980.

Excavations of the rest of the site continued under the direction of Bryn Walters till 1991 and the mosaic was protected by a roof in 2000. Since 2018 a new team has taken care of the site and the visible remains have again been restored after a period of neglect.

== Description ==
At its height, the villa had around sixty rooms, two thermal bath suites, many mosaic floors and several heated hypocausts. The large courtyard villa enclosed an area of about 1 ha (2.5 acres), making it one of the largest in Britain. Many of the buildings were two storeys high and included five tall towers. The villa had a number of detached workshops and barns. The separate building with the triconch-form mosaics attached to a large courtyard building is interpreted as a religious cult centre, associated with the pagan revival under Julian the Apostate (361–363).

The triconch building is very unusual and similar buildings only exist in North Africa and only much later in the sixth-century Byzantine world. This mosaic is usually interpreted in very complicated pagan religious terms involving not only Orpheus, but Bacchus and Apollo, the hall being seen as a temple of this religion. Other buildings may have been converted to accommodate visiting pilgrims.

== History ==
The settlement began life as a small short-lived military establishment guarding a road crossing of the River Kennet. It later became a small fortlet to protect the river Kennet route for water-borne transport. From 70 AD the road was still used and the site passed to local ownership with circular huts and in 120 a Roman-style rectangular timber building replaced them (the West Range). In 170 this was replaced by a large two-storeyed winged stone corridor villa with integral bath suite.

In the 3rd century the surrounding towns and countryside prospered, reflected in major changes to the villa. In 190 a larger kitchen was added to the rear of the west range, and in 220 the central room was fitted with a hypocaust, and in the baths a hot dry-heat room (laconicum) was added and the cold-plunge was rebuilt with steps. In 250–260 the wings of the villa were extended with more buildings.

In 270–280 all the outer rooms and corridors of the west range were demolished and rebuilt. The baths in the west range were removed and all the hypocaust floors filled in to create a new set of rooms with mosaic floors. Wings connected by a first-floor veranda at the front of the house were completed with corner towers, the south tower having a hypocaust. The south range barn was converted into a residential building with bath suite. In 290 the east wing was built completing the enclosure offour wings, and including a large stable block and an impressive gatehouse, the grandest in Britain, with three arched vaults supporting long rooms on the floor above, possibly for grain.

The large building in which the Orpheus mosaic was later inserted was built next to the river in 60–80 as a round house and around 100 was converted to an open-sided barn with corn dryers and bread ovens In 300 a small bath suite was inserted. In 310–350 the baths were extended. The corn-dryer was demolished and replaced by a cold bathroom (frigidarium) and a changing room (apodyterium) with fireplace.

The middle of the 4th century saw much upheaval in Roman Britain when many towns and villas were damaged. At Littlecote, in 360, the barn-like part was converted into a courtyard, and the triconch hall was built alongside, with its own elaborate bath suite. Upon its floor was laid the now famous Orpheus mosaic. Also major changes in the functions of the villa took place, from numismatic evidence, as farming ceased but the exotic Orpheus Hall suggests that the site was converted to a religious centre dedicated to the cult of Orpheus and Bacchus which dates to ancient Greece.

Many of the buildings were demolished or fell into decay around 400, shortly after the Theodosian legislation against paganism and before the Roman withdrawal from Britain. Two sub-Roman timber structures have been identified on the site.

== See also ==
- Mildenhall, Wiltshire, near the site of the Roman town of Cunetio, a few miles west along the River Kennet valley where the Cunetio Hoard of almost 55,000 Roman coins was found in 1978
