= Orpheus mosaic =

Roman artworks depicting Orpheus

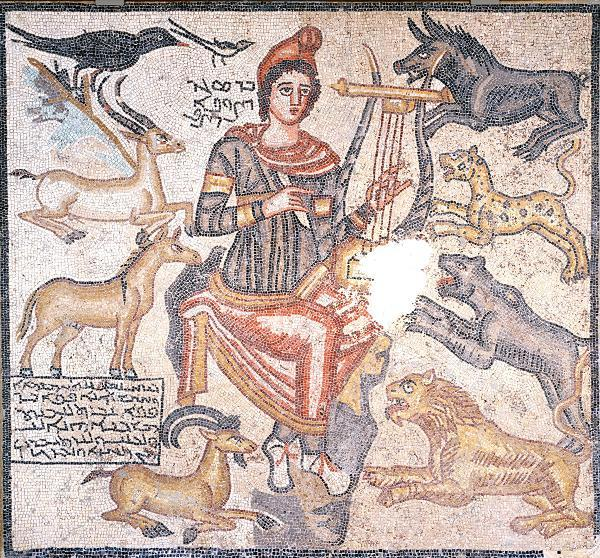
From near Edessa, AD 194, now returned to Turkey from Dallas.

Orpheus mosaics are found throughout the Roman Empire, normally in large Roman villas. The scene normally shown is Orpheus playing his lyre, and attracting birds and animals of many species to gather around him. Orpheus was a popular subject in classical art, and was also used in Early Christian art as a symbol for Christ.

The standard depiction in Roman mosaic scenes (for the Romano-British variant see below) shows him seated and playing a lyre or cithara, wearing a Phrygian cap, often beside a tree, and includes many animals drawn and pacified by his playing. The fox was considered Orpheus's special animal and may be placed beside him. In large examples the animals spread to occupy the whole floor of a room. Titles such as Orpheus Charming/Taming the Beasts may be used. Usually the whole scene occupies the same space, but sometimes Orpheus and the animals are each in compartments separated by borders with geometrical decoration. In such cases the compartments with animals are very similar to those in other mosaics with no central figure. An alternative composition shows Dionysus (Bacchus) as the central figure, surrounded by animals, more lively than those around Orpheus.

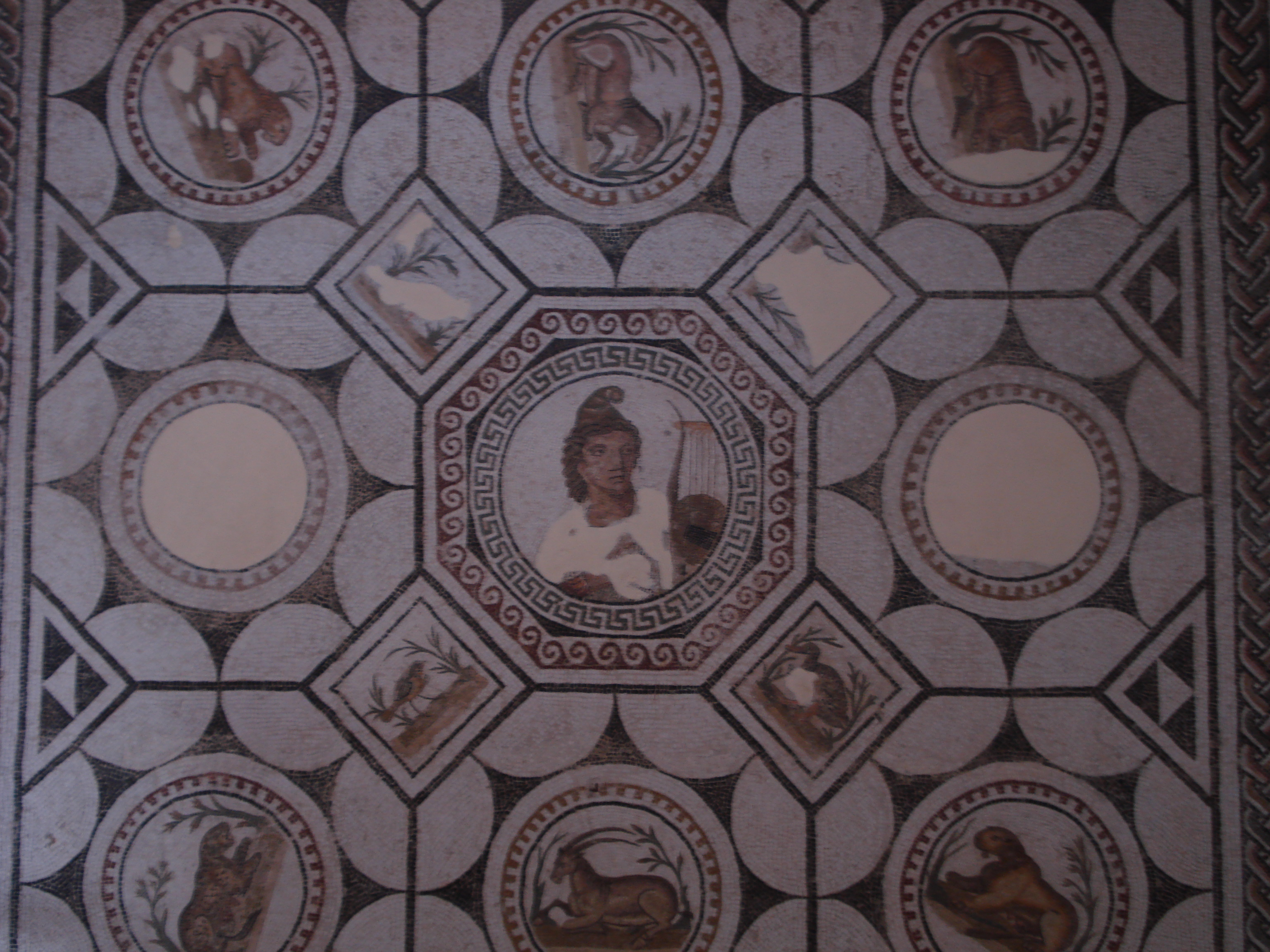
Compartmented example from Tunisia

An example of the usual composition with animals in the 6th-century Gaza synagogue is identified as David by an inscription in Hebrew, and has added royal attributes. Another adaptation is a Christian mosaic of Adam giving names to the animals (Genesis 2: 19–20) in a church of around 486–502 in Apamea, Syria. Some of the mosaics seem to relate to the rather elusive philosophical or religious doctrines of Orphism.

In Byzantine mosaic large scenes with animals tended to be hunting scenes (one of the largest being again at Apamea). These are, at least initially, drawn from the popular venatio ("hunting") displays in the amphitheatres, where a variety of exotic beasts were released to fight and be killed. Despite the contrast in atmosphere, the Berlin mosaic from a house in Miletus manages to combine both a venatio and an Orpheus with animals in its two parts. An arena programme recorded by Martial combined an acted-out scene of Orpheus charming the animals with the punishment of criminals by damnatio ad bestias.

== Romano-British composition ==
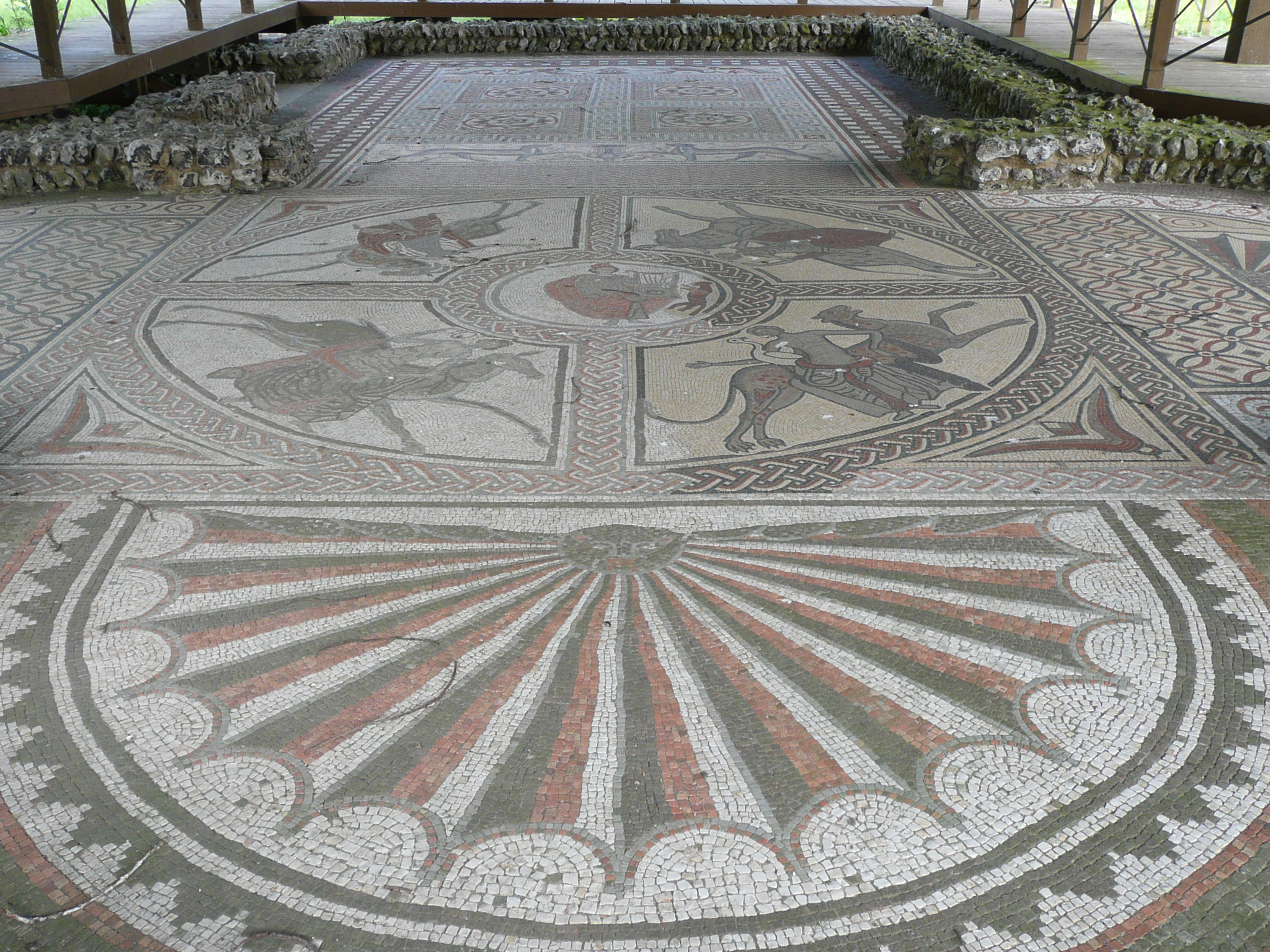
Romano-British style at Littlecote Roman Villa, England

In what appears to be a unique feature of Orpheus mosaics from Roman Britain, the animals may be arranged parading in a circle around him, feet facing out, so that some are the right way up whatever angle the floor is seen from; nine examples are known. The subject is found, for example, in Woodchester in England, the second largest of its kind in Europe and one of the most intricate. It dates to c. AD 325 and was re-discovered by Gloucestershire-born antiquarian Samuel Lysons in 1793. It has been uncovered seven times since 1880, the last time in 1973, but there are no plans to reveal it again.

Other English examples are at Littlecote Roman Villa, Brading Roman Villa, and the Corinium Museum. Another, from Newton St Loe, is now in Bristol City Museum and Art Gallery, but between 1841 and 1851 had been moved to Keynsham railway station, and set in a floor there. The Corinium (that is, modern Cirencester) example gives its name to the "Corinium Orpheus School" of Romano-British mosaic artists. The Littlecote mosaic in particular, which seems to have been added to a room used as some kind of private space for religious cult, has been suggested as evidencing a syncretic cult of Orpheus, Apollo and Bacchus.

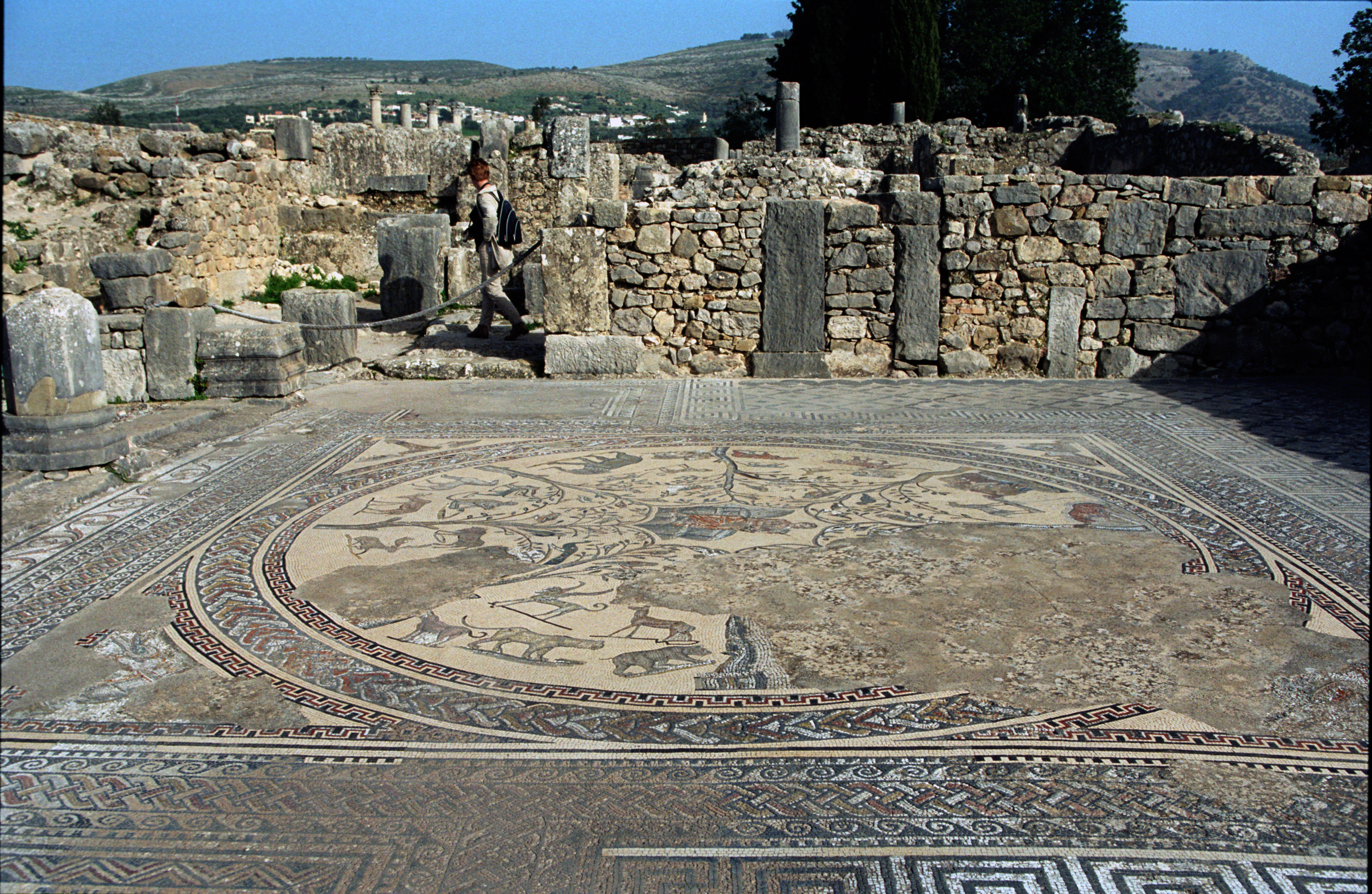
House of Orpheus, Volubilis, Morocco

There are two other circular Orpheus mosaics, in Volubilis in present-day Morocco, and Mérida in Spain, but the compositions are different.

== Examples ==
A large example takes up all the floor of a room in the Villa Romana del Casale, Piazza Armerina, Sicily, one of the finest sites for mosaics. Other notable examples are in Leptis Magna in Libya (in situ), and in Palermo, Arles, the Musée gallo-romain in Saint-Romain-en-Gal Vienne, Perugia and the Bardo National Museum (Tunis). A new Orpheus mosaic has recently been found in Prusias ad Hypium, near present-day Duzce in Turkey.

The example in Zaragoza, now in the museum, came from the "Casa de Orfeo", which was located next to the Roman walls near the central market in Caesaraugusta, as the city was called. Unusually, the figure of Orpheus is surrounded by birds only, with a single snake, while below only big cats are shown.

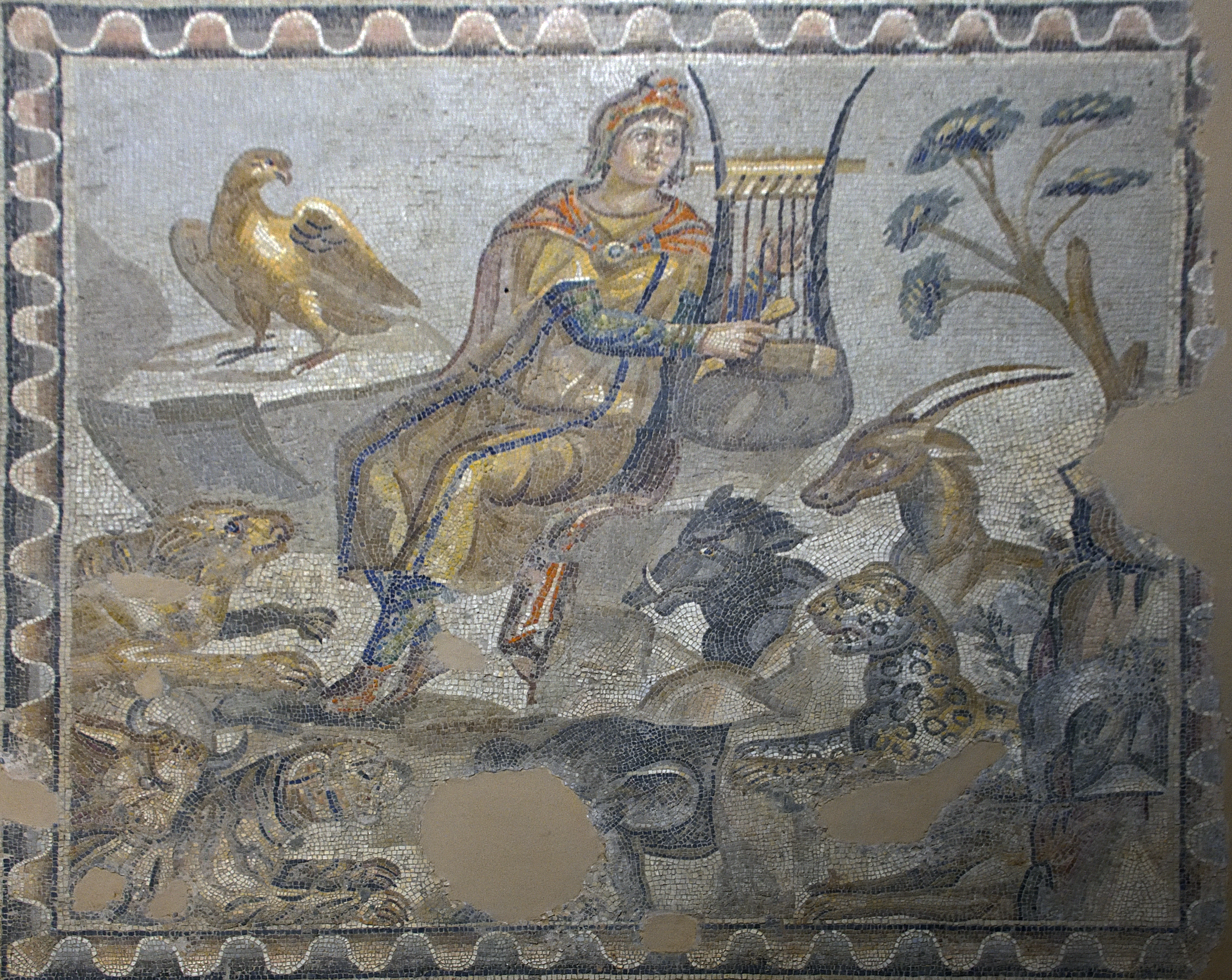
Antakya Archaeology Museum

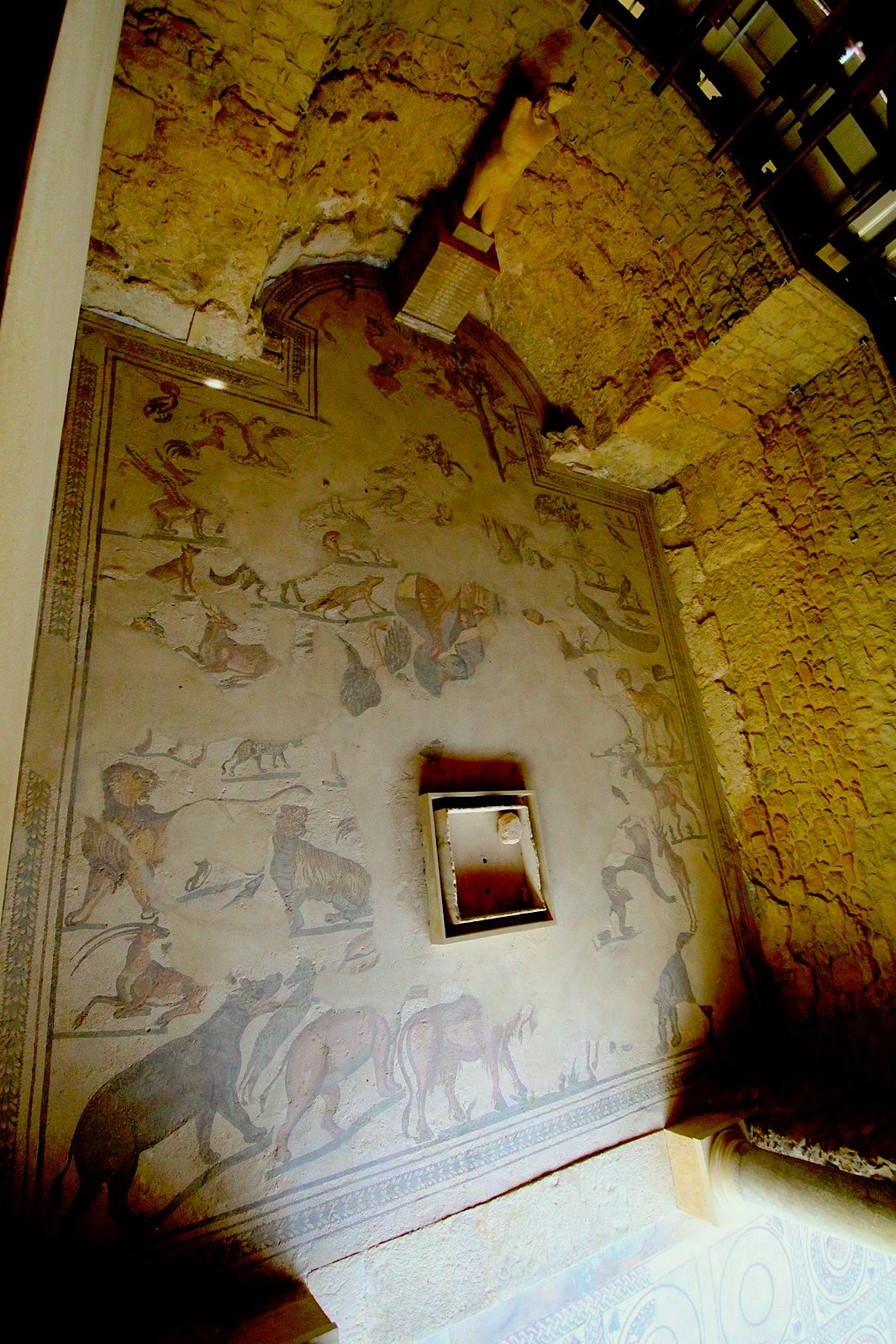
Diaeta of Orpheus, Villa Romana del Casale, Piazza Armerina, Sicily

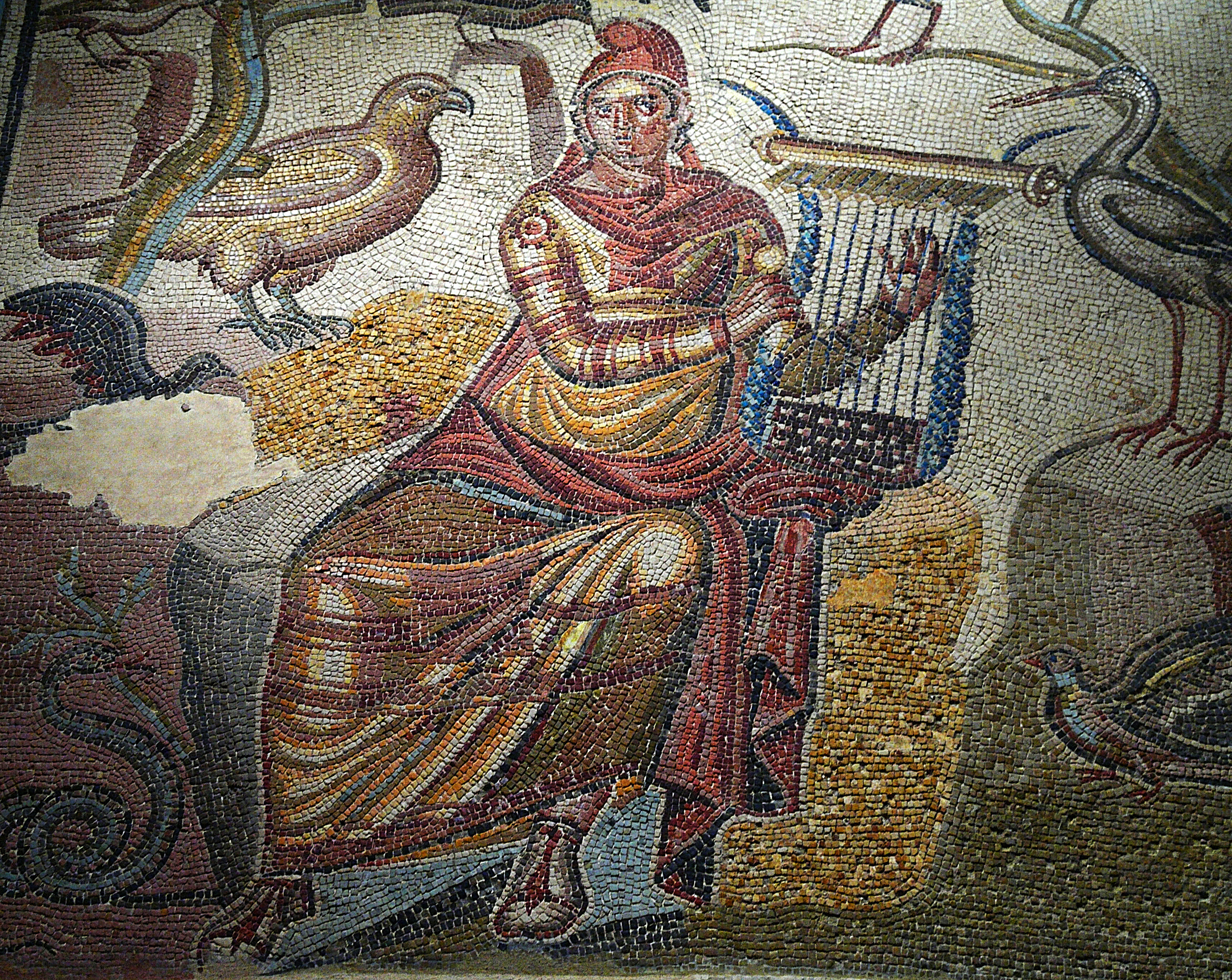
Detail from Zaragoza Fragment of the Mosaic of Orpheus

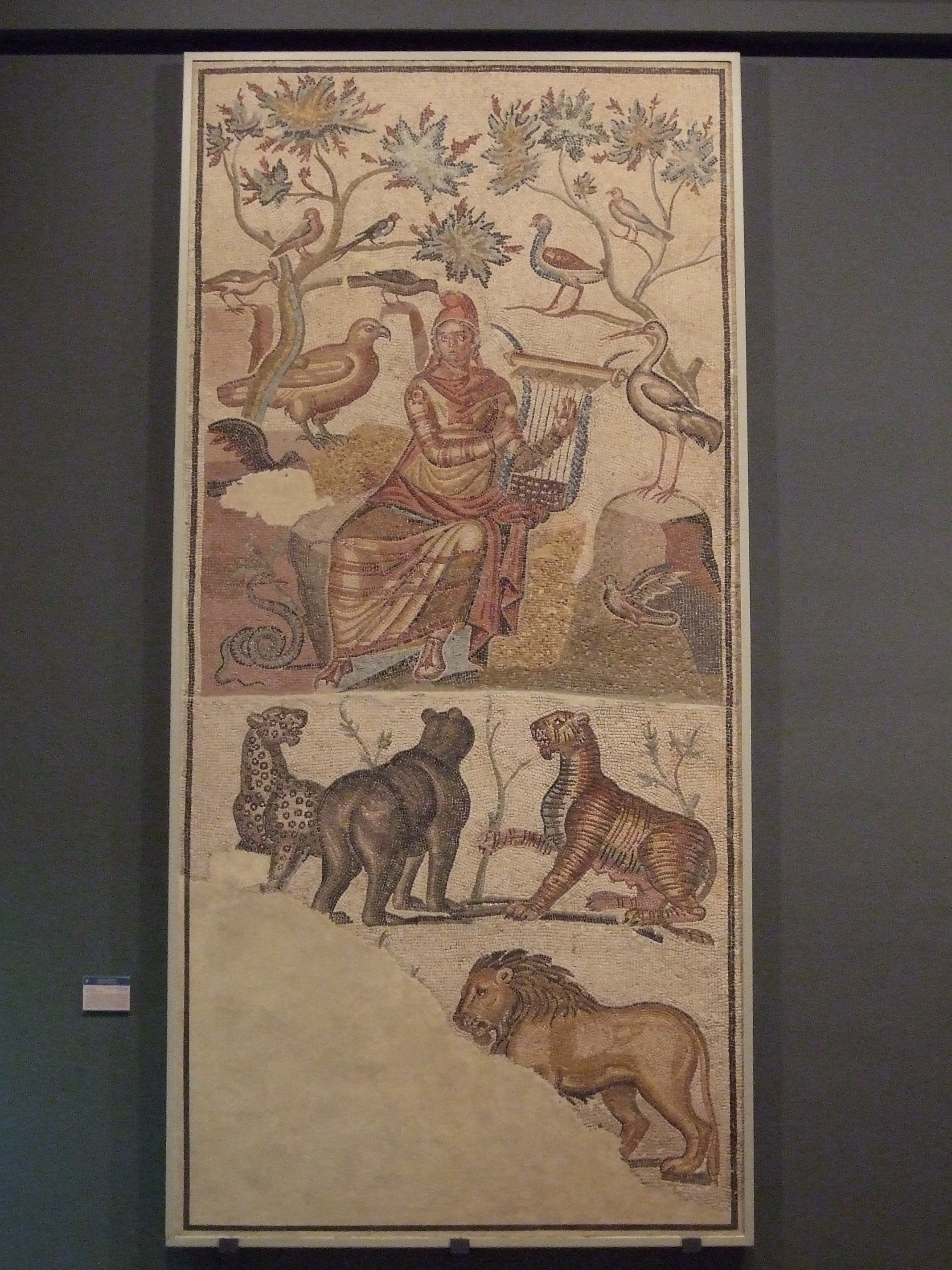
The full mosaic, Zaragoza Museum

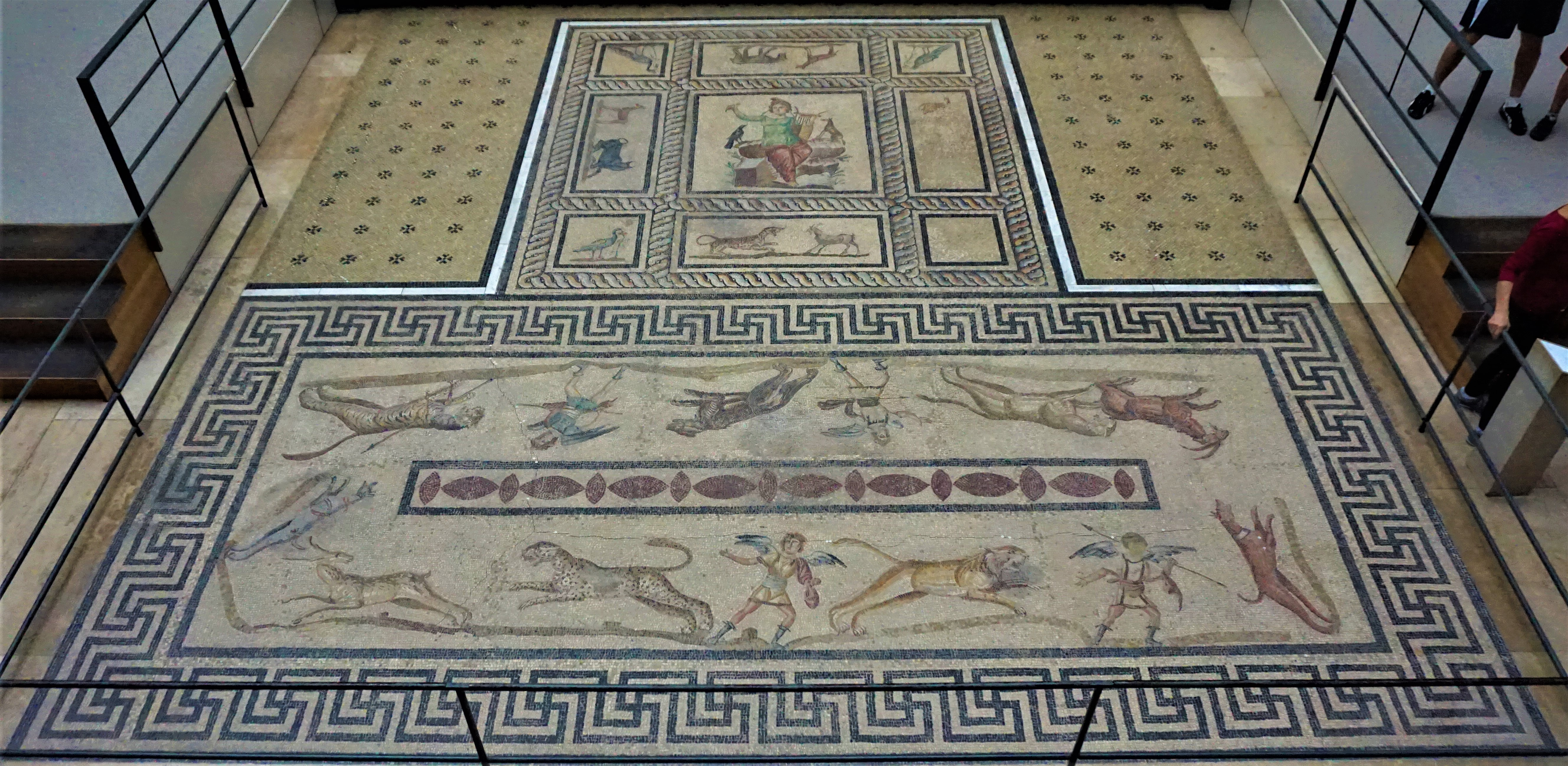
2nd-century example from Miletus, now in the Pergamon Museum, Berlin. Venatio scene near, compartmented Orpheus scene far.

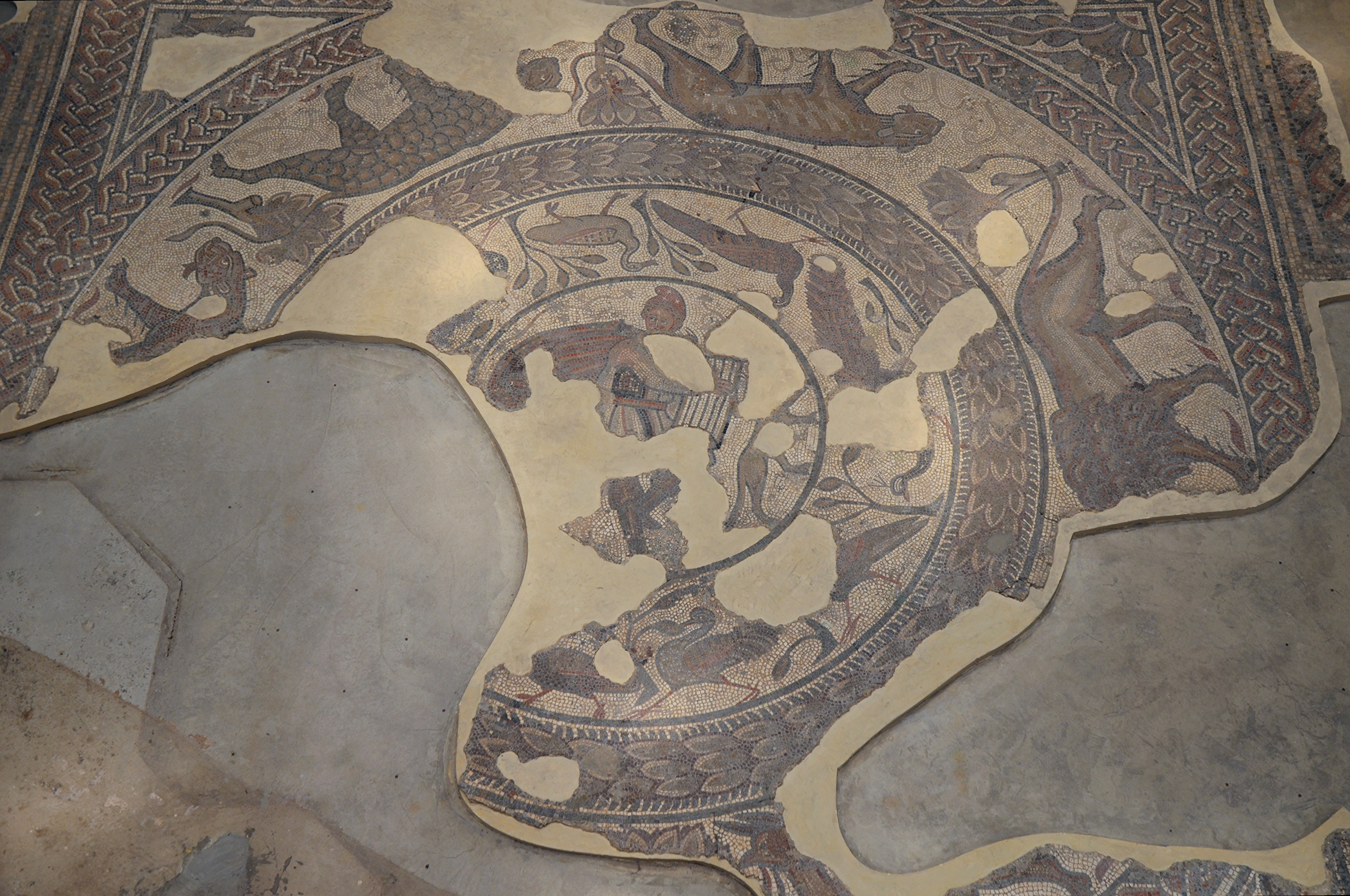
British-style, 4th century, Corinium Museum, Cirencester

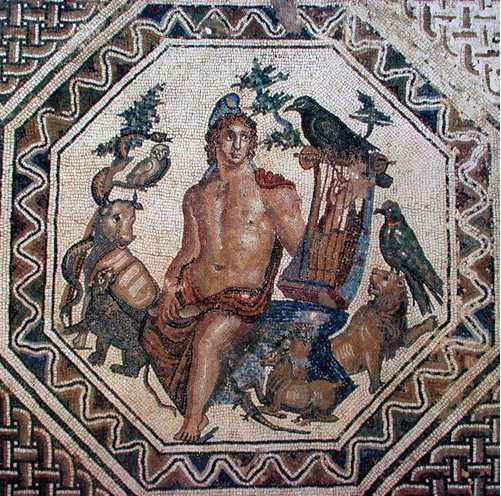
Orpheus mosaic at Porto Torres

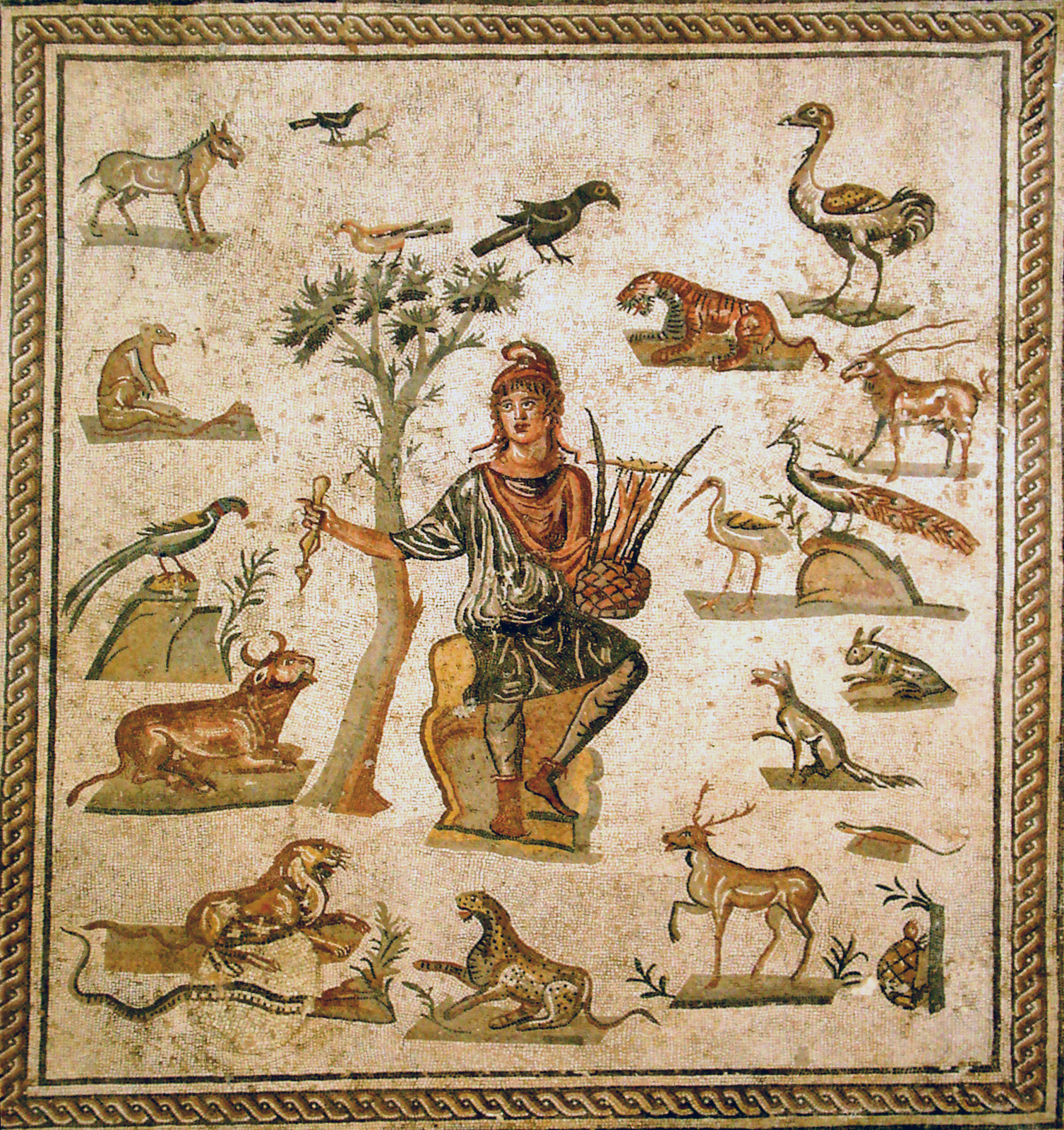
From Sicily, now Palermo

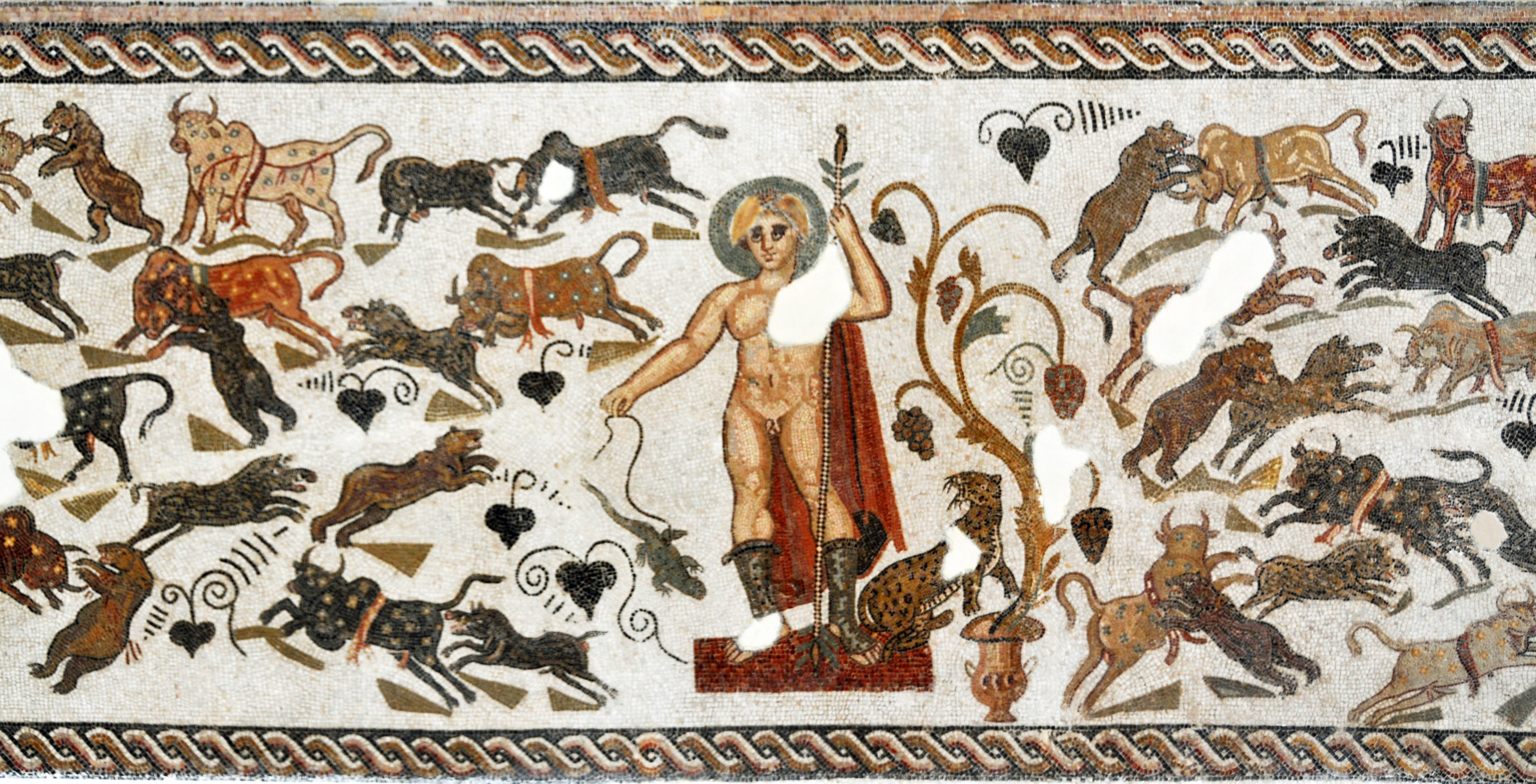
Bacchus/Dionysus with animals, El Jem, Tunisia
