= Woodchester =

Village in Gloucestershire, England

Coordinates: 51°43′N 2°14′W

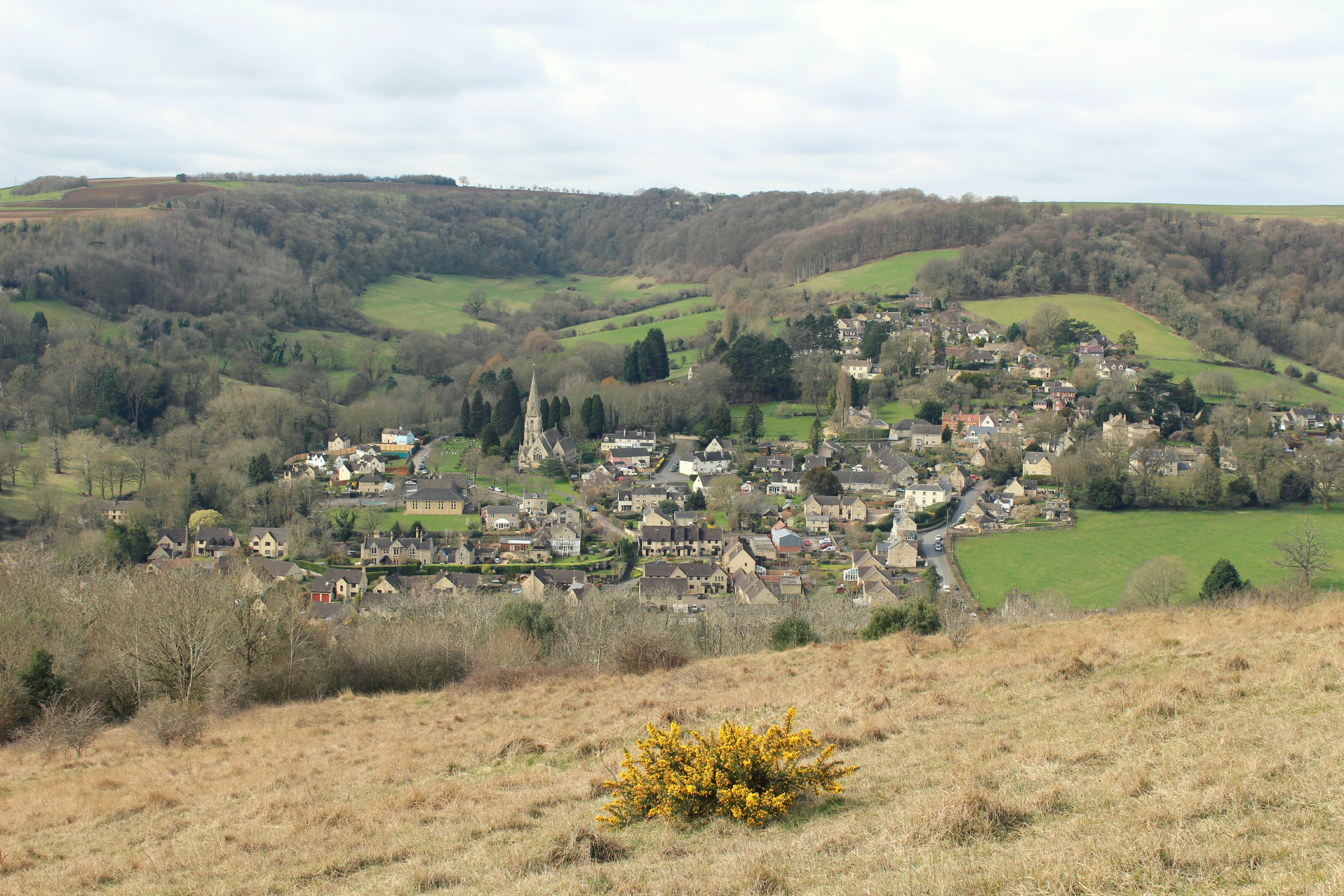

- Location within Gloucestershire
- Population: 1,206 (2011 Census)
- District: Stroud
- Shire county: Gloucestershire
- Region: South West
- Country: England
- Sovereign state: United Kingdom
- Post town: Stroud
- Postcode district: GL5
- Police: Gloucestershire
- Fire: Gloucestershire
- Ambulance: South Western
- UK Parliament: Stroud

Woodchester is a Gloucestershire village in the Nailsworth (or Woodchester) Valley, a valley in the South Cotswolds in England, running southwards from Stroud along the A46 road to Nailsworth. The parish population taken at the 2011 census was 1,206.

Woodchester is approximately at the midpoint between Stroud and Nailsworth, about two miles south of Stroud. It is divided into North and South Woodchester, with a side valley between the two settlements. There are pubs in both North and South (The Royal Oak in North and The Ram in South) and a post office with a shop in North Woodchester. There was a post office (called Woodchester) in South Woodchester but it closed, along with the shop, in June 2008. Woodchester is notable as the location of Woodchester Roman Villa. The village's parish church of St Mary's was designed by Samuel Sanders Teulon.

The nearby Woodchester Mansion is regularly open to the public and stands in a landscaped valley. This valley is now owned by the National Trust and is open daily. There are three waymarked walks. The car park is at Nympsfield near Coaley Peak, not at Woodchester as some visitors suppose.

Education is provided by the Woodchester Endowed C of E Primary School under Headteacher Mrs Pennington, which serves around 135 pupils. Following the Ofsted inspection in 2018, the school was rated Outstanding, point four on a four-point scale. The school has secured the Healthy Schools award.

The former Convent of Poor Clares was home to nuns of the Poor Clares order from 1850 to 2011.

== Governance ==
The village falls in the 'Amberley and Woodchester' electoral ward This ward starts in the north at Woodchester and stretches south to Amberley. The total ward population taken at the 2011 census was 2,116.

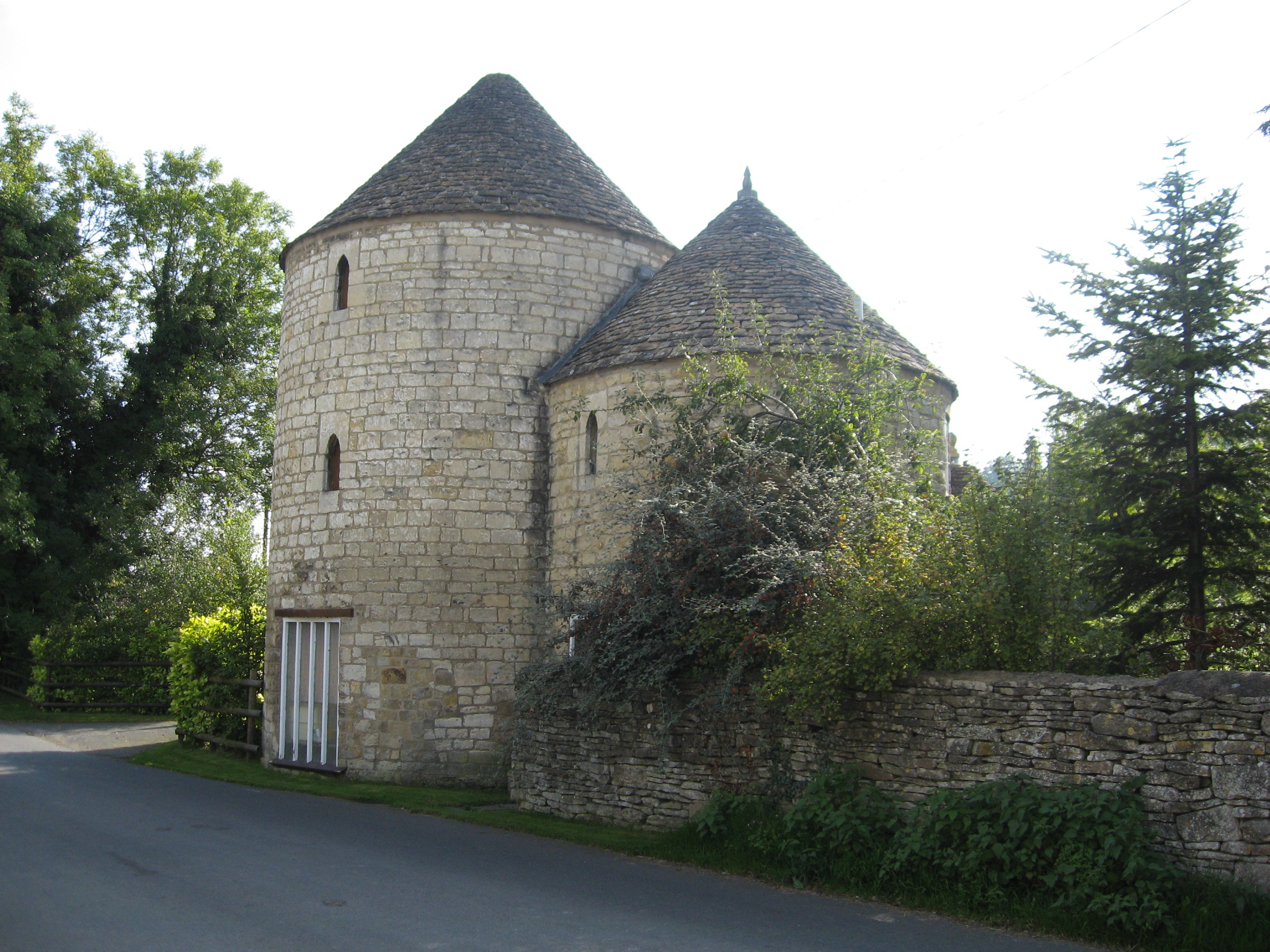
Double Round House at Woodchester

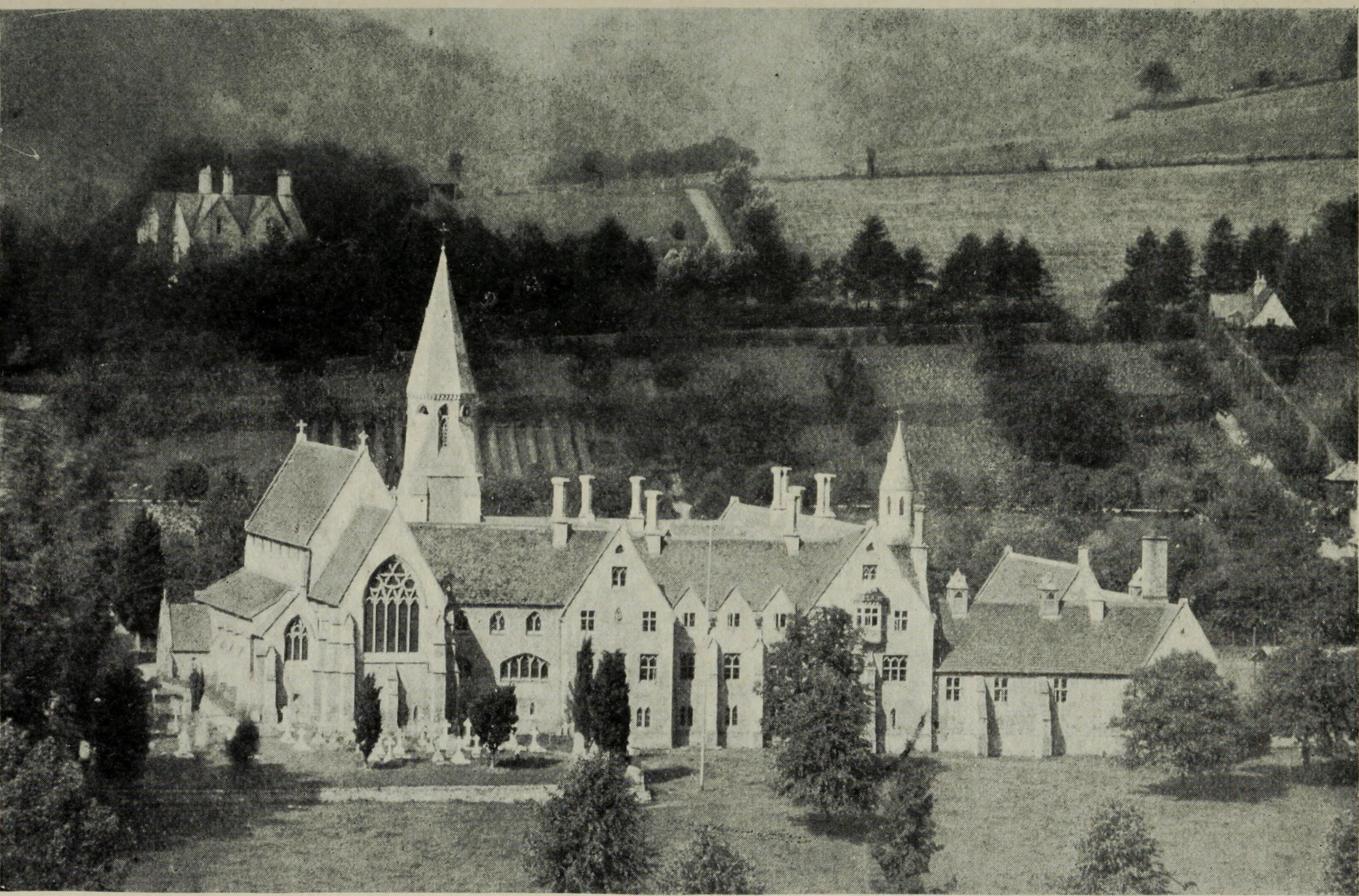
Noviciate of the Dominican order in Woodchester (1921)

== Notable people ==
- Mary Rose Columba Adams (1832–1891), prioress born in Woodchester
- John Vaughan Campbell (1876–1944), British Army officer, Victoria Cross recipient, died there
- Eddie "The Eagle" Edwards, ski jumper
- Henry Foley (1811–1891), Jesuit historian
- Muir Mathieson (born 1973), CFO of Nationwide Building Society
- Josh O'Connor (born 1990), actor
- Sir George Paul, 2nd Baronet (1746–1820), born in Woodchester
- Mary Wemyss (1868–1951), novelist
