= Ogbourne =

Ogbourne may refer to:

== Places ==
- Ogbourne Maizey
- Ogbourne St Andrew
- Ogbourne St George

== People ==
- Lyndon Ogbourne (born 1983), English actor

== Other ==
- Ogbourne railway station, railway station in Wiltshire
