= Transport in Swindon =

Transport in Swindon, England, and the surroundings has directly contributed to the town's growth and the ingress of businesses and industries.

Located on the M4 Corridor and the Great Western Railway Main Line, Swindon's transport connections are adequate to the needs of a growing town.

== Road ==
=== Historic ===
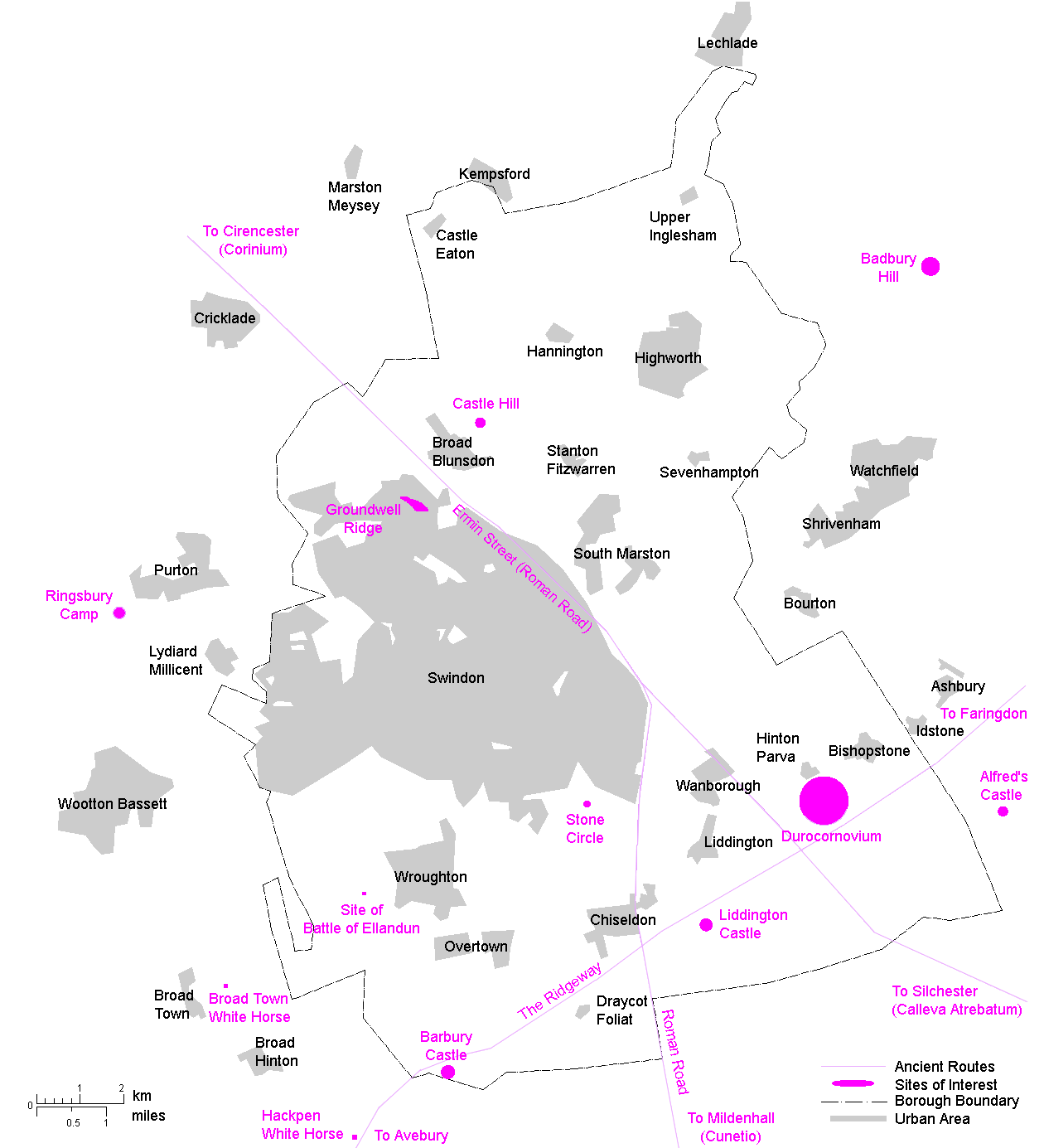
Historical routes and sites in the Borough of Swindon

The town of Swindon lies near a junction of two Roman roads which passed close to the site of the Roman fortified town of Durocornovium. Ermin Way passed to the east of the town and was the route from Corinium (Cirencester) to Calleva Atrebatum (Silchester). Secondly a road from Cunetio (Mildenhall, near Marlborough) joined the Ermin Way near Durocornovium.

The ancient path of the Ridgeway passes to the south of the town.

=== Turnpikes ===
With the expansion of the quarries and also the introduction of the Turnpike Act (1706), the four main access roads into the town were turned into turnpikes between 1751 and 1775. These were joined by the Swindon to Faringdon road completed in 1757, and the Swindon to Marlborough road in 1761.

Toll houses were also placed on the roads to Stratton St Margaret, Marlborough, Devizes, Wootton Bassett and Cricklade.

Residents of Rodbourne Cheney and the Liddiard's came into Swindon via roadways that linked Shaw and Rushey Platt with the gate at Kingshill.

The amount levied depended on the type of cart, the number of horses used and the width of the wheels (as narrower wheels caused more damage to the road).

=== Roads and Motorways ===
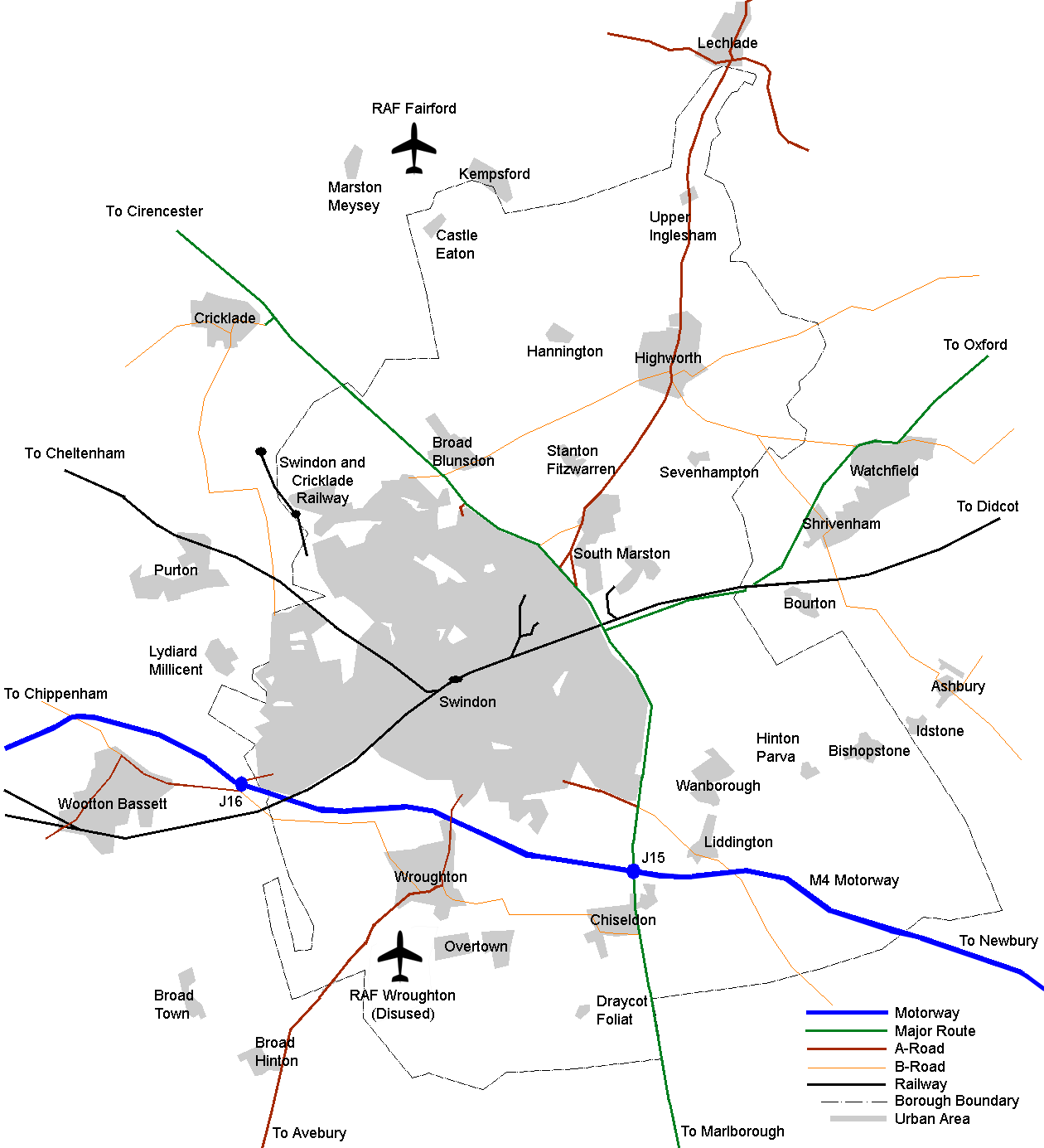
Transport routes in the Borough of Swindon

Major roads near or passing through Swindon:

- M4 motorway – London to South Wales, Junctions 15 and 16
- A3102 – Swindon to Malmesbury
- A346 – Swindon to Ludgershall
- A361/A4361 – Devon to Northamptonshire
- A419 – Chiseldon to Whitminster, Gloucestershire
- A420 – Bristol to Oxford
- A4259 – Swindon to Wanborough

=== Roundabouts ===
The town is famous for its roundabouts, to the extent of selling yearly calendars featuring a different roundabout for each month. The most notable roundabout is the Magic Roundabout that lies at the junction of Drove Road, Queens Drive and Fleming Way near the County Ground.

The official name of this roundabout used to be County Islands, although hardly anyone other than officials called it by this name. The official name was changed in the late 1990s to match its popular name. It is the subject of a pop song by local band XTC. Locals often refer to it by the colloquial name "The Tragic Roundabout" due to the many motor accidents that occur on it, usually caused by drivers not familiar with its operation. Accidents frequently occur on matchdays for Swindon Town F.C. and at weekends, where the increased traffic during these periods can be a contributory factor in causing them.

=== Speed cameras ===
In 2009 Swindon became the first English local council to abandon the use of fixed speed cameras, arguing that the £320,000 a year cost did not represent an effective way to reduce road accidents. Mobile cameras continue to operate. Within four years the town was the safest town to drive in the UK, based on accident rates per 1,000 registered vehicles. Counsellor Peter Greenhalgh, the Cabinet Member for Council Transformation, Transport and Strategic Planning, linked the finding to the removal of speed cameras and resultant additional funding for road safety, alongside close working with the police.

=== Coaches ===
National Express operates service 401 from Swindon bus station towards Bristol and Heathrow. Local operator Barnes Coaches offers day trip and tourism tickets, in addition to private hire.

=== Buses ===
Urban buses were introduced into Swindon in 1927, after the abandonment of the Wilts and Berks Canal. Operated by Swindon Corporation, they made the tram network redundant by 1929.

Swindon Corporation Buses became Thamesdown Transport in 1974 when the council boundaries and name changed. Later a limited company to comply with the Transport Act 1985 with the council as a major shareholder and subsidiser, Thamesdown Transport was Swindon's largest urban bus operator. It was sold in February 2017 to the Go-Ahead Group and rebranded Swindon's Bus Company.

Swindon's second oldest operator, after Thamesdown Transport, is Stagecoach West, the successor to the Swindon branch of Bristol Tramways established in 1921. Formerly part of the National Bus Company and operating under the name Swindon and District, it was privatised in 1986 and absorbed into the Stagecoach Group in 1993.

The former Stagecoach Bus Depot on Eastcott Road has been approved for development as a housing site.

== Rail ==
=== Trams ===
See Swindon Corporation Tramways

=== Trains ===
==== Great Western Railway ====
Swindon was chosen as the site of the Great Western Railway's Swindon Works in 1841, an event which led to the creation of a Railway Town known as New Swindon and the eventual amalgamation into the town today.

The works covered a site of 320 acres (1.3 km^{2}) and became the focal point for the creation of New Swindon and the influx of over 10,000 new residents in the next 50 years. In its heyday, the railway employed over 14,000 people in Swindon and the main locomotive fabrication workshop, the A Shop was, at 11.25 acres (45,500 m^{2}), one of the largest covered areas in the world.

The factory had to be immediately adjacent to the railway, and it was necessary for the workers to be housed as close as possible to it.

As the town of Swindon at that time was over a mile away on top of the hill, a modest Railway Village of 300 homes was proposed in 1841. Building began using stone from Swindon's quarries and also from stone excavated during the boring of Box Tunnel, 243 houses were completed by 1853 with the population of the town being estimated at over 2,500. All 300 houses were completed by the mid-1860s.

Consequently, a new town was built, known as New Swindon. This town would remain both physically and administratively separate from Old Swindon until the creation of Swindon Corporation in 1900.

Swindon railway station was opened in 1842 and until 1895 every passing train stopped here for at least 10 minutes to change locomotives. As such Swindon station hosted the first recorded Railway refreshment rooms.

In 1962 building of new locomotives ceased at Swindon. Locomotive repairs and carriage and wagon work continued, though the original carriage and wagon workshop was sold. The whole works closed in 1986, but one building currently houses Swindon Steam Railway Museum. The engineers' office is now the headquarters of English Heritage, and purpose-built storage now houses the English Heritage Archive.

Most of the remaining buildings are used as part of the Swindon Designer Outlet Village.

==== Midland and South Western Junction Railway ====
Known as Swindon's other railway, the Midland and South Western Junction Railway was formed in 1884 and ran trains from Andover to Cheltenham. A station was sited in Old Town, Swindon Town, and is now listed as Old Town Railway Cutting, Swindon a site of special scientific interest.

GWR absorbed the company before the railways were nationalised in 1948. The line finally closed in 1961.

==== Today ====
The frequent trains to London (51 minutes journey time) and Bristol (37 minutes via Bath) on the Great Western Main Line are used by commuters. These services, and Swindon station, are operated by Great Western Railway, a FirstGroup company.

The Golden Valley Line to Cheltenham Spa was reduced to a single track in 1968 but the second track was reinstated in 2014. This increased capacity and removed bottlenecks to enable further growth of the Swindon conurbation.

Swindon is well served by long-distance railway lines but has no suburban rail services. Swindon station is the only national rail station within the town or the surrounding borough. Those who wish to travel into the town centre from the suburbs must use local bus services or private transport. The Swindon and Cricklade Railway, which operates on a small section of the former Midland and South Western Junction Railway route for enthusiasts and tourists, runs steam-hauled trains between Blunsdon station and Hayes Knoll.

==== Future ====
On the Great Western Main Line, there are plans to increase the number of tracks to four between Swindon and Didcot. There are plans to provide a direct rail link to Heathrow Airport by 2026.

The heritage Swindon and Cricklade Railway is due to extend North to Cricklade and South towards Moulden Hill.

== Canals ==
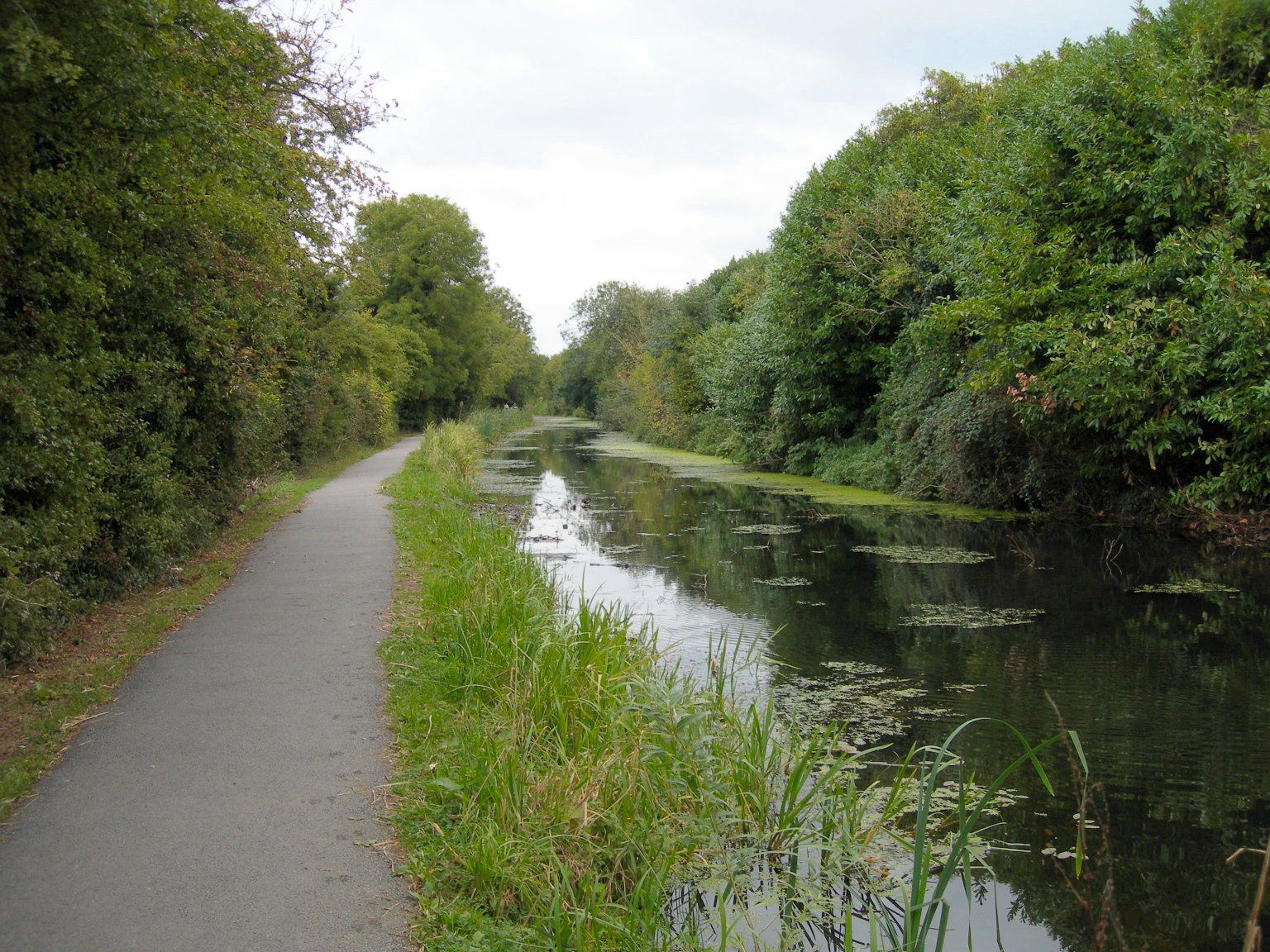
A section of the canal near Rushey Platt, Swindon

In 1775, an act of parliament was passed authorising the building of the Wilts and Berks Canal, a "waterway that would link the Kennet and Avon Canal at Semington, near Trowbridge with the River Thames at Abingdon.." It reached Swindon in 1804 and Abingdon in 1810. In all, 58 miles (93 km) of waterway was created.

In 1813, another act of parliament was passed authorising the North Wilts Canal, a proposal by the Thames & Severn Canal Company and the Wilts & Berks Canal Company to link the canal at Swindon with the Thames and Severn Canal at Latton, near Cricklade. Consisting of 9 miles (14 km) of waterway and twelve locks, it was completed in 1814. The two canals were consolidated in 1821 and brought together under the auspices of the Wilts & Berks Navigation Company.

With the railways providing a faster and cheaper method of transport, the canal was relatively unused by 1895. It was dredged in 1908, but declared ruined soon after. It was finally closed under the Wilts & Berks Canal Abandonment Act, 1914 and partly filled in.

A new route for the canal to the south of the town is under development, with the first section opened at Wichelstowe in 2011.

== Cycling ==
Swindon has an extensive network of cycle paths with interactive and pdf maps available as well as cycle parking. National Cycle Network Route 45 runs through Swindon.

== Air ==
Civil airfields existed in Swindon's immediate surroundings up until the mid 20th century, with a small airfield at South Marston (X2SO) attached to the Vickers/Supermarine factory, now the site of Honda. The nearest civilian airfield with a concrete runway is now at Kemble, with major international air traffic using Bristol Airport.

=== International airports ===
- Bristol Airport – 42 miles (68 km) – 47 miles via M4.
- Heathrow Airport – 57 miles (92 km) – 65 miles via M4.
- Southampton Airport – 46 miles – 61 miles via M4, A34.
- Cardiff Airport – 68 miles – 85 miles via M4.
- Birmingham Airport – 62 miles – 89 miles via A419, M5, M42.
- Gatwick Airport – 74 miles – 95 miles via M4, M3, M25, M23.
- Exeter Airport – 91 miles – 116 miles via M4, M5.

=== Local airfields ===
- Cotswold Airport (EGBP) – Kemble, Gloucestershire – 14 miles northwest.
- Draycott (X2SW) – (near Chiseldon) – grass strip accepting light aircraft and helicopters – 5 miles south.
- Oaksey Park (EGTW) – Malmesbury – 11 miles northwest.

=== Military airfields ===
- MoD Lyneham – 9 miles southwest – formerly RAF Lyneham, EGDL
- RAF Fairford – 10 miles north
- RAF Brize Norton – 16 miles northeast
- Netheravon Airfield (EGDN) – grass strip – Army
- Upavon (X2UA) – grass strip – formerly EGDJ
- Wanborough (X2WB) – closed
- Wroughton (X2RN) – closed – formerly RAF Wroughton, EGDT

== See also ==
- Swindon
- Transport in the United Kingdom
