= Buses in Swindon =

Bus services in Swindon, Wiltshire, England

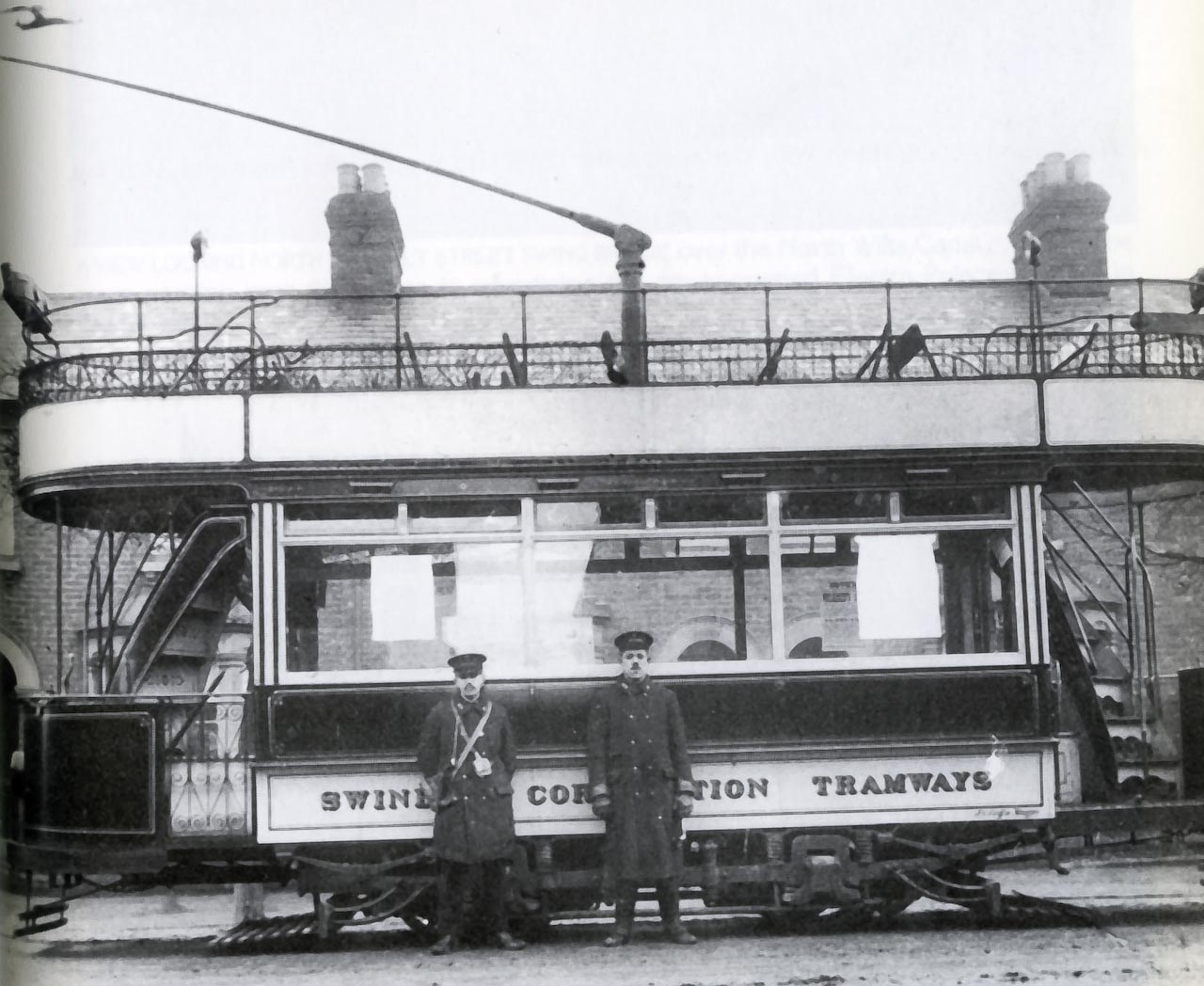
A tram of Swindon Corporation Tramways in 1911

Buses in Swindon have been the major method of public transport in the region since the beginning of the 20th century. Introduced in 1927 and replacing the tram system in 1929, the area is now served by numerous operators.

== History ==
Swindon Corporation was the local council formed by the 1901 Municipal Borough charter, and Swindon Corporation Tramways started to operate electric trams in 1904.

Motor-bus operation started in 1927 and two years later all the trams were replaced by this form of transport. In 1942 Swindon became one of the first authorities to take delivery of the "Arab" made by Guy Motors. One of these, No. 51 (DHR 192), is now preserved at RAF Wroughton near Swindon which is an Annex of the National Museum of Science and Industry and open to the public on certain days of the year.

On local government re-organisation in the early 1970s the name was changed to Thamesdown Transport. Following a sale to the Go-Ahead Group in February 2017, it was rebranded Swindon's Bus Company.

Rural and inter-urban bus services around Swindon were mainly operated by Bristol Tramways (later known as Bristol Omnibus Company), which established a branch in Swindon in 1921. Bristol became part of the National Bus Company, and in 1983 the Swindon branch was transferred to a new company, Cheltenham & Gloucester Omnibus Company, operating in Swindon under the name Swindon and District. Cheltenham & Gloucester was sold to its management in 1986, and absorbed into the Stagecoach Group as Stagecoach in Swindon in 1993.

== Bus station and Fleming Way ==
=== Original bus station ===
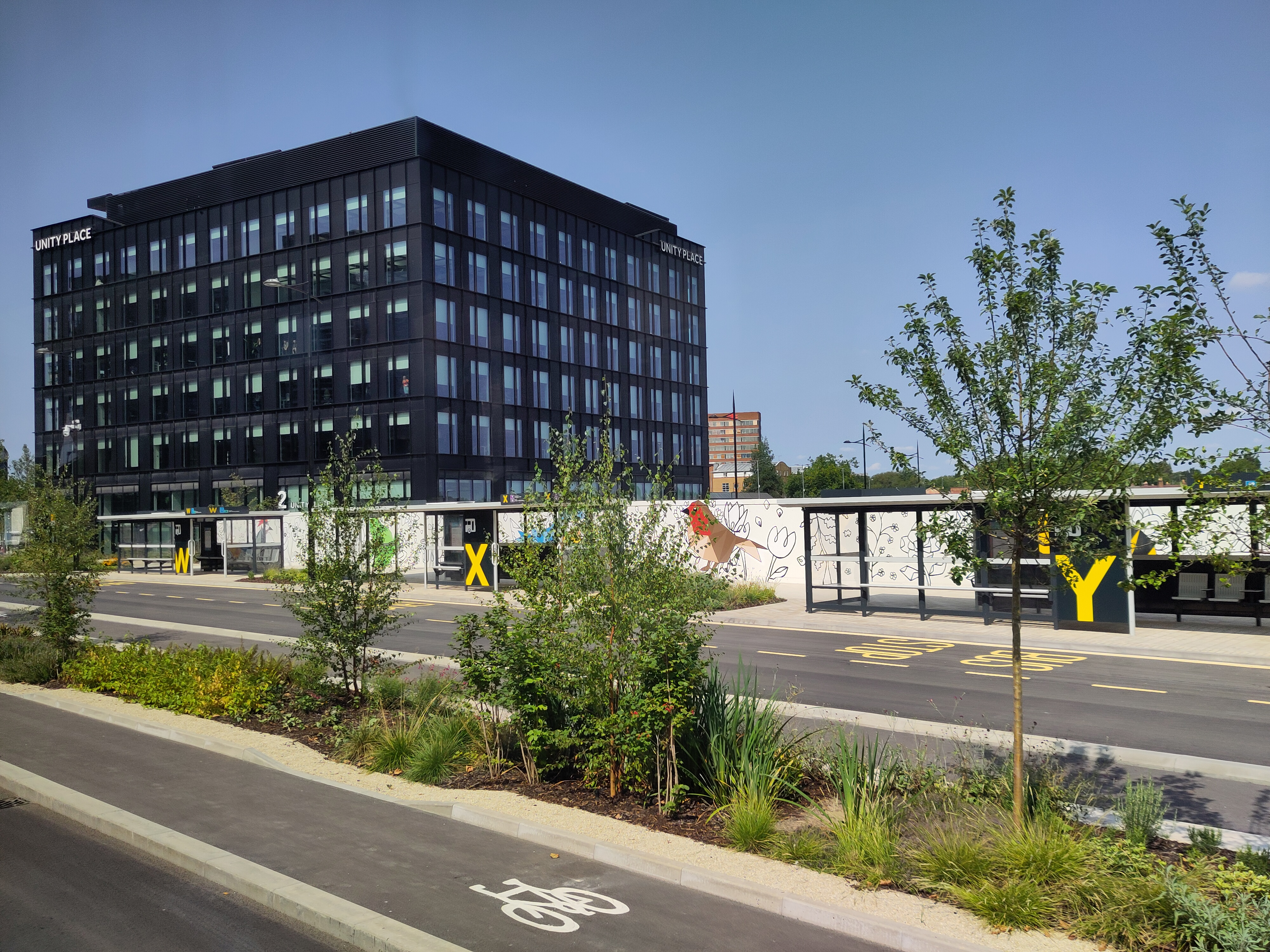
Bus stops at Fleming Way Bus Interchange

Before 1966 Swindon had no bus station, and buses departed from street stops in and around Regent Circus. The first bus station was opened in 1966 on the site of former housing close to the bus depot in Corporation Street. Following expansion it eventually took up most of the land between Manchester Road and Fleming Way. The site was redeveloped in the 1980s on construction of the current facility, with the bus station replaced by office accommodation now used by Zurich Financial Services.

=== Existing bus station ===
The current bus station was constructed in the 1980s, adjacent to the former site of Thamesdown Transport's garages. It predominantly acts as a terminus for buses serving destinations outside of the Swindon urban area or non-frequent services. It is also used as a coach station, with services by National Express and international services leaving from here.

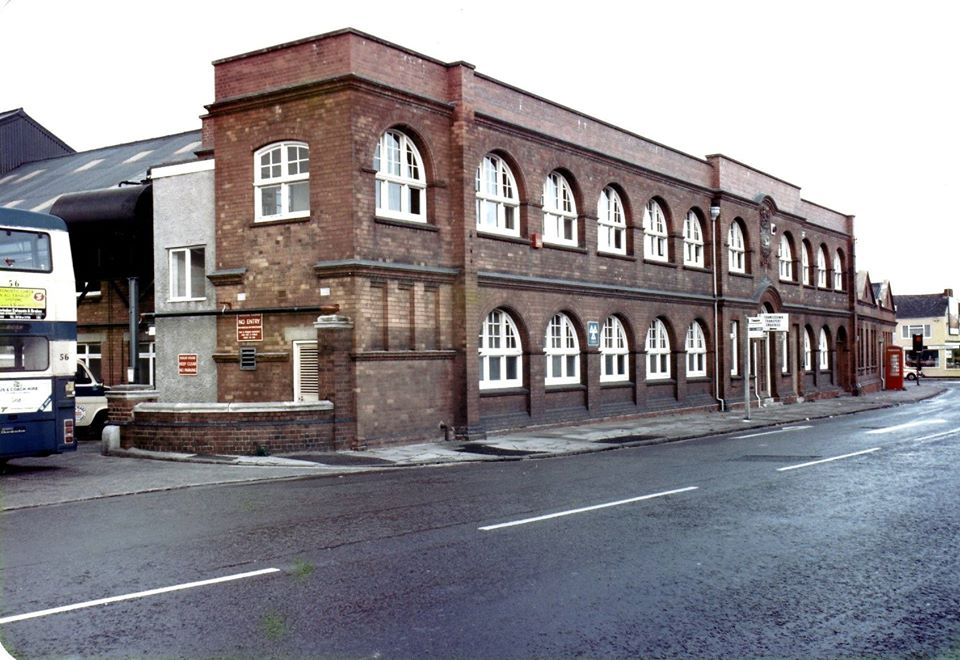
Thamesdown Transport's original Corporation Street office

=== Redevelopment ===
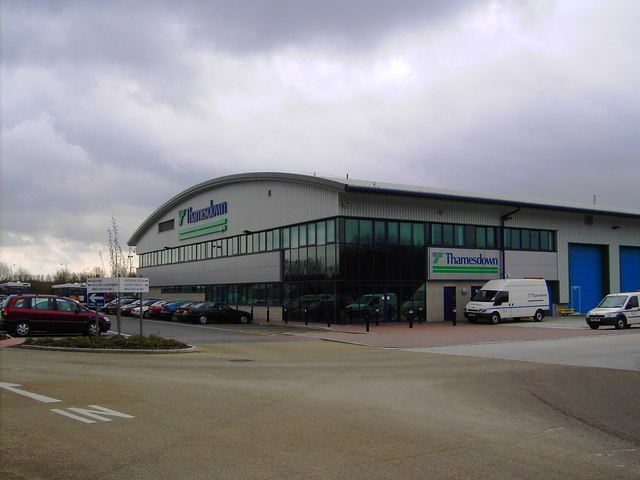
Thamesdown's depot in 2007, now used by Swindon's Bus Company

In 2004, Swindon Borough Council announced the proposed redevelopment of the town centre area including the bus station. Thamesdown Transport moved from their Corporation Street home to a new facility at Barnfield in 2005, with the land earmarked for conversion to commercial properties. As well as town centre offices, the project also makes provision for housing, shops, cafes and restaurants. The plans would lead to the demolition of all buildings in this area, including the current bus station, with a replacement to be built along Fleming Way.

In 2015, a multi-storey carpark adjacent to the bus station was demolished as part of this scheme. The former Stagecoach Bus Depot on Eastcott Road was approved for development as a housing site in 2018.

The final stage of work in the Fleming Way area began in 2022. The new bus interchange at Fleming Way opened to public bus services in August 2025. Swindon Borough Council announced their intention to demolish the former bus station by Christmas 2025, with plans to redevelop the site as a new theatre and entertainment venue.

== Operators ==
=== Coachstyle ===
Coachstyle provides services to Royal Wootton Bassett, Malmesbury and Chippenham from Fleming Way bus interchange, through service 99.

=== FlixBus ===
German coach operator FlixBus operate service 044 between London Victoria, Heathrow Airport, Swindon, Cheltenham and Gloucester. FlixBus services operate from Swindon's Regent Circus, and do not currently use the Fleming Way bus interchange.

=== National Express ===
National Express provide nationwide coach travel from Fleming Way bus interchange, to London Victoria, Heathrow Airport, Wembley Stadium, and services to certain festivals and events.

=== Stagecoach West ===
Stagecoach West operate in West and North Swindon and in rural areas. Two routes are branded as Stagecoach Gold services with higher specification buses: the S6 to Oxford via Shrivenham and Faringdon, and the 55 to Chippenham via Calne.

=== Swindon's Bus Company ===
Go South Coast operate the majority of Swindon's urban services and school buses under the brand Swindon's Bus Company. They also provide employee services for Nationwide, having 3 bus routes (the N1, the NW2 and the NW3), with all of the routes serving the headquarters of Nationwide. All services currently call at Fleming Way bus interchange.

=== Salisbury Reds ===
Go South Coast also operate the X5 service under the Salisbury Reds brand, which travels to Marlborough, Pewsey, Amesbury and Salisbury hourly from Fleming Way bus interchange.

=== Pulhams Coaches ===
Pulhams Coaches, a brand used by Go-Ahead Group's Oxford Bus Company, operate the 64 service from the Fleming Way bus interchange, to Highworth, Lechlade, Carterton and Witney.

=== West Berkshire Council ===
West Berkshire Council operate the number 47 bus service, branded "West Berkshire Connect", which operates from the Fleming Way bus interchange to Wanborough, Bishopstone, Ashbury and Lambourn.

== Ticketing ==
The majority of tickets purchased on Swindon's Bus Company and Stagecoach West services are honoured by both operators, through the purchase of a Swindon Travel Pass.

== See also ==
- Transport in Swindon
