= Draycot Foliat =

Hamlet in Wiltshire, England

Coordinates: 51.497°N 1.737°W

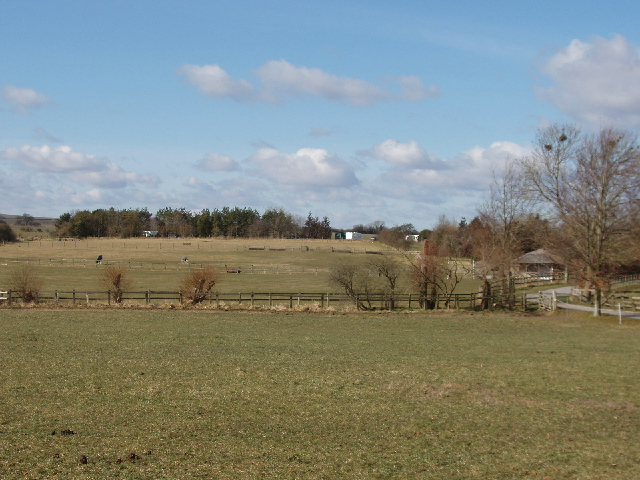
- Sheppards Farm, Draycot Foliat

- Location within Wiltshire
- OS grid reference: SU184776
- Civil parish: Chiseldon
- Unitary authority: Swindon
- Ceremonial county: Wiltshire
- Region: South West
- Country: England
- Sovereign state: United Kingdom
- Post town: Swindon
- Postcode district: SN4
- Dialling code: 01793
- Police: Wiltshire
- Fire: Dorset and Wiltshire
- Ambulance: South Western
- UK Parliament: East Wiltshire

Draycot Foliat is a hamlet in the civil parish of Chiseldon, in the Swindon district, in the ceremonial county of Wiltshire, England, on the back road between Chiseldon to the north and Ogbourne St. George to the south. The nearest major town is Swindon which is about 5 miles (8 km) north. A notable feature is a small airstrip with its model helicopter instruction centre. There is one smallholding, called Draycot Farm, and a larger farm, Sheppard's Farm, which comprises some 750 acres (300 hectares). In addition, there are between ten and twenty other houses. The Og, a tributary of the River Kennet (itself a tributary of the Thames), flows for about half of the year down the centre of the hamlet, forcing the road into a sharp hairpin bend.

== History ==
In 1086 it was recorded that Draycot had enough land for six ploughs, and at the time, there were two ploughs and a serf on five hides held in the demesne while there were three ploughs, four villeins and seven bordars on the remaining hides. There were in total 40 acres (16 hectares) of pasture and eighteen of meadow at the time of the Domesday Survey. By 1842 there were 605 acres (245 ha) of arable land, 76 acres (31 ha) of meadow and 2 acres (0.8 ha) of woodland within the parish, split among the three farms, Draycot, Sheppard's and King's. In 1849, King's farm was offered for sale and was bought by Draycot farm, giving the situation found today.

In 1891 the parish had a population of 40. On 31 December 1894 the civil parish of Draycot Foliat was added to the civil parish of Chiseldon.

It is possible that Draycot Foliat lent its name to the town of Dracut, incorporated in 1701 in Massachusetts.

== The name ==
Since the earliest mentions of the settlement the name has been spelled in many ways including combinations of Draycot, Draycote, Draycott, Dreycot, and Dreycott with Foliat, Folliatt, Foliatt and Folyat and occasionally just Crawecot or just Draycote. The preferred spelling currently is Draycot Foliat and that name appears on a local signpost. However, many maps and similar resources give the spelling of Draycott Foliat, considered incorrect by the inhabitants.

The Foliat suffix is from the Foliot family, who held the manor in the late 13th century.

== The church ==
Draycot Foliat had a small church, and the nearby village of Chiseldon was considered within the Draycot parish; however, the situation was reversed in 1571 when Edmund Gheast became the Bishop of Sarum (Salisbury) and ordered the church be demolished. It was ordered, because neither Draycot nor neighbouring Chiseldon was wealthy enough to sustain their own rectors, that the two parishes be merged. Because the Chiseldon parish was larger, it was proposed that the Draycot parish be subsumed by it, and because Chiseldon's church was in a state of disrepair, the Bishop ordered that Draycot's church be demolished and the raw materials used to repair Chiseldon. Tradition has it that the extension to Holy Cross church Chiseldon, known as the Draycot aisle, was constructed from these raw materials. The resulting parish was expected to pay the sum of five shillings and twelve pence to the Deacon of Wiltshire every Passover. This order was signed, not only by Edmund Gheast, but also by both Edmond Chandoyes and Thomas Chaderton, the patrons of Chiseldon and Draycot and Christopher Dewe, the vicar of Chiseldon.

In some weathers, the outline of the church can still be made out and it appears to have been about seventy-five feet long and twenty wide. Today, Draycott Foliat is part of the parish of Chiseldon with Draycot Foliat, in the area of the Ridgeway Benefice.

== Chiseldon Camp ==
In 1915, the War Office requisitioned part of the Burderop Park estate for army training; there had previously been annual military camps and manoeuvres in the area. Numerous wooden huts and a 240-bed hospital were built immediately east of Draycot, and a long siding was built from the Midland and South Western Junction Railway at Chiseldon station. Training of infantrymen took 15 weeks, and there were soon 12,000 in training – some accommodated in tents – at what became known as Chiseldon Camp. From 1917 there was also a secure hospital treating venereal disease, which grew to have over 1,100 beds. Overall, the site measured about half a mile (800m) in each direction.

After the war, the camp became a demobilisation centre and a temporary home for South African, Australian and New Zealand troops. The railway siding was removed in 1921 and the site, reduced in size, became for a time the School of Military Administration. In 1930, Chiseldon Camp Halt was built on the main line about a mile south of Chiseldon station and about half a mile from the camp.

Training activity at the site increased for the Second World War, and King George VI visited for inspections on 29 March 1940. In late 1942, the camp was the first to receive American troops, who later arrived in large numbers. A 750-bed hospital, built to the north of the camp in 1943 and designated the US 130th Station Hospital, became a transit centre for casualties evacuated from the invasion of Europe; over 30,000 of them between June 1944 and the end of that year.

Combat training ceased at the end of the war; the American hospital closed in May 1945 and was demolished in 1955. An Ordnance Survey map published in 1960 shows the camp buildings, with a network of roads remaining from the site of the hospital. The site continued in army use until 1962, and demolition of most of the remaining buildings began in 1974; the married quarters were sold as housing, named Ridgeway View.
