= Ridgeway View =

Coordinates: 51.502°N 1.730°W

- Hamlet
- Interactive map of Ridgeway View
- Country: England
- County: Wiltshire

Ridgeway View is a hamlet 1 mile (1.6 km) south of the village of Chiseldon near Swindon, in the county of Wiltshire, England.

During World War I, a large hutted army camp was built to the east of Draycot Foliat, which was later called Chiseldon Camp. From 1930 there was a small station on the Swindon to Marlborough line, Chiseldon Camp Halt. In World War II the area housed British and American troops, and around 1963, after the army left, the married quarters became residential housing, later named Ridgeway View.

Ridgeway View falls within the civil parish of Chiseldon.

Leicester Tigers and England winger Jonny May was born, and grew up in, Ridgeway View.
