= Moredon Halt railway station =

Former railway station in Wiltshire, England

Moredon Halt

General information
- Location: Swindon; England
- Coordinates: 51.5851°N 1.8245°W
- Grid reference: SU122873
- Platforms: 1

Other information
- Status: Disused

History
- Original company: Midland and South Western Junction Railway
- Pre-grouping: Midland and South Western Junction Railway
- Post-grouping: Great Western Railway

Key dates
- 25 March 1913: Station opened
- 28 September 1924: Station closed
Location

Moredon Halt railway station was on the Midland and South Western Junction Railway in Wiltshire. The station, a few miles north west of Swindon, opened on 25 March 1913 on the section of the line from Swindon Town to Cirencester that had itself opened in 1883.

Moredon Halt was built primarily for milk traffic and passenger services were not advertised, though it appears to have been used by infrequent passengers throughout its short life. It officially closed in September 1924 but the Oakley book referred to below indicates that passenger receipts were still recorded up to 1935.

The single-platform station faced a siding that led to Moredon power station and up 100 coal wagons arrived each day. The M&SWJR line as a whole closed to passengers in 1961, but coal deliveries to the power station remained until 1969.

== Route ==
Preceding station	Disused railways	Following station
Blunsdon	Midland and South Western Junction Railway; Swindon & Cheltenham Extension Railway	Rushey Platt
