= Ridgeway Benefice =

Group of parishes in Wiltshire, England

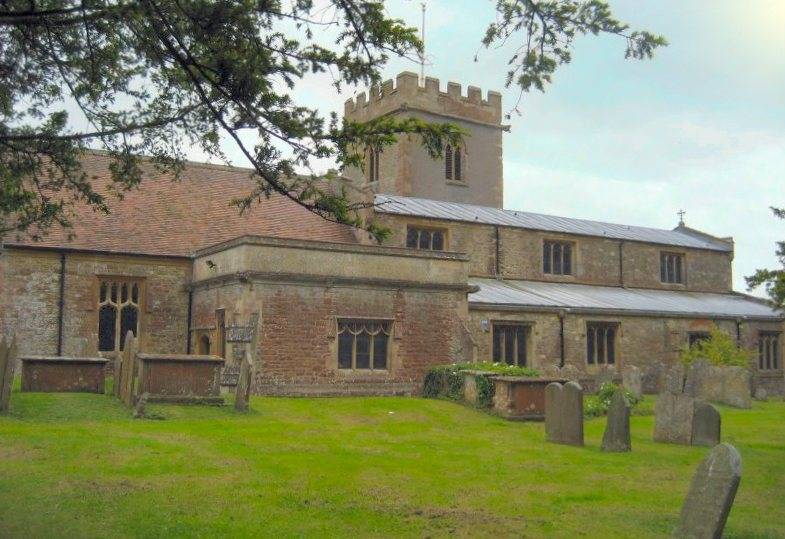
Holy Cross Church, Chiseldon

The Ridgeway Benefice is a group of parishes in Wiltshire, England, to the north of Marlborough. The parishes are Chiseldon with Draycot Foliat; Ogbourne St Andrew, which also serves the hamlets of Ogbourne Maizey and Rockley; and Ogbourne St George.

The benefice is part of the Marlborough Deanery in the Diocese of Salisbury of the Church of England, which is part of the Christian, Anglican Communion.

The benefice is run by Reverend Roger Powell.
