= Ogbourne railway station =

Former railway station in Wiltshire, England

Ogbourne
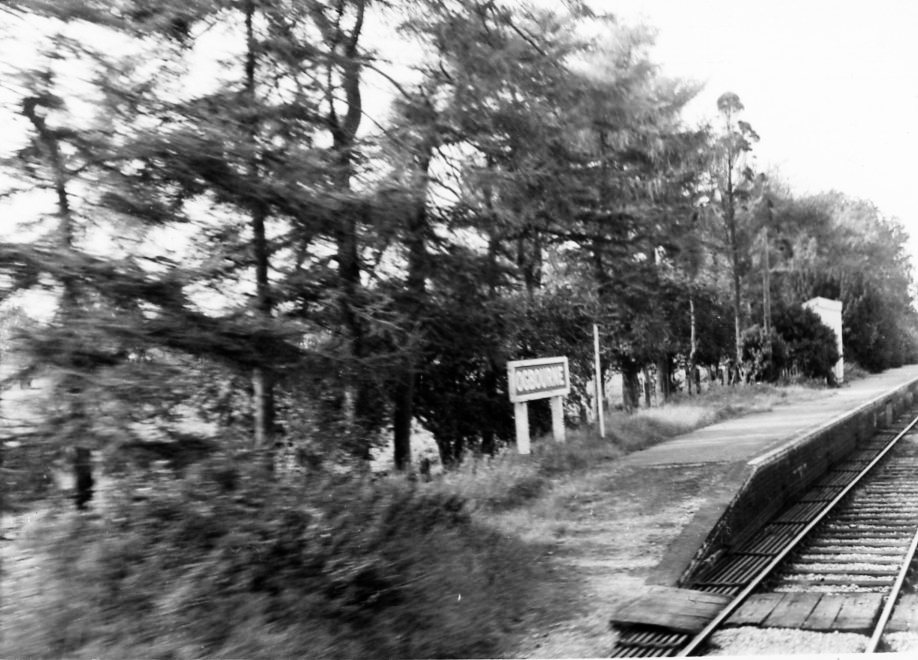

General information
- Location: Ogbourne St George, Wiltshire; England
- Coordinates: 51.4690°N 1.7102°W
- Platforms: 2

Other information
- Status: Disused

History
- Original company: Midland and South Western Junction Railway
- Post-grouping: Great Western Railway

Key dates
- 27 July 1881: Station opens
- 1961: Station closes
Location

Ogbourne railway station was on the Midland and South Western Junction Railway in Wiltshire, England. The station opened on 27 July 1881 on the Swindon Town to Marlborough section of the Swindon, Marlborough and Andover Railway. In 1883, a northwards extension, the Swindon and Cheltenham Extension Railway, opened from Swindon Town to Cirencester Watermoor, with further northward extension to a junction with the Great Western Railway's Cheltenham to Banbury line near Andoversford opening in 1891, enabling through trains from the Midlands to the south, through Ogbourne. The SM&AR and the S&CER had in 1884 amalgamated to form the M&SWJR.

== History ==
Ogbourne station was sited on a curved section of track to the north of the village of Ogbourne St George. The station had a passing loop on the single track line, and this loop was lengthened by troops during the Second World War to handle the long trains and considerable movements on this railway that military activity brought.

There was also a siding at Ogbourne St. Andrew used by the nearby horse stables.

As a whole, traffic on the M&SWJR fell steeply after the Second World War and the line closed to passengers in 1961, with goods facilities withdrawn from this section of the line at the same time. The over-bridge formed a dangerous choke point on the road and was removed in 1964. No trace of the station now remains, the Swindon to Marlborough A346 road having been realigned to run on the former railway route in 1969–1970. The road now passes over what was the station forecourt and the small freight yard, which had a loading dock for local cattle that had been herded down the village high street en route to Swindon market.

== Route ==
Preceding station	Disused railways	Following station
Chiseldon Camp Halt	Midland and South Western Junction Railway; Swindon Marlborough and Andover Railway	Marlborough Low Level
