= Chiseldon House Hotel =

Building in Wiltshire, England

Coordinates: 51°30′53.9″N 1°43′50.4″W

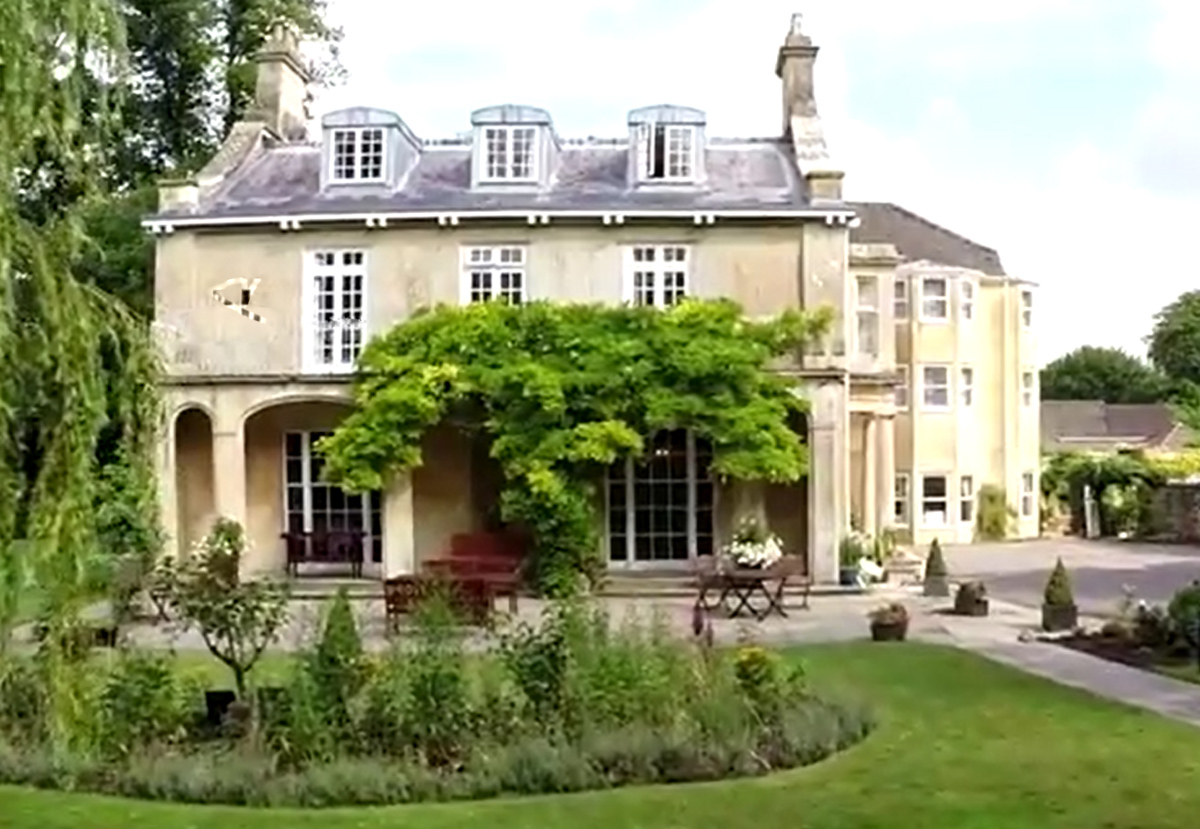
Chiseldon House

Chiseldon House Hotel in Chiseldon, Wiltshire, England, is a building of historical significance and is listed in the National Heritage Register. It was built as a villa in the early 19th century for the Browne family and continued to be used as a private residence until 1964, when it was converted to a hotel. It is now a country house hotel and restaurant with facilities for special events, particularly weddings.

== The Browne family ==
Chiseldon house was built in 1840 by William Ruddle Browne (1787–1848). He was born in the Chiseldon area in 1787; his father William Browne owned a prosperous farm in the White Horse Vale. He trained to be a farmer and in 1822 he married, but his wife died in childbirth ten years later. After this he became a land agent and steward.

In 1840 he built Chiseldon House and occupied the property with his brother John Browne (1791–1853) and his wife Ann. At the end of 1840 William married a second time, at the age of 53: his new wife was Ann Nicolson Lee who was 22 years his junior. The couple had two daughters and one son. Their son William Edward Nicolson Browne inherited the house when he was 21 years of age in about 1868.

After the death of William Ruddle Brown in 1848, the other members of the Browne family continued to live there. John died in 1853. William Edward Nicholson Browne was born in 1847, a year before his father's death. He was educated as a lawyer at Oxford University and was called to the Bar in 1871. In the same year he married Catherine Bagley of London. He lived at Chiseldon House for some years but frequently leased out the property.

== Later residents ==
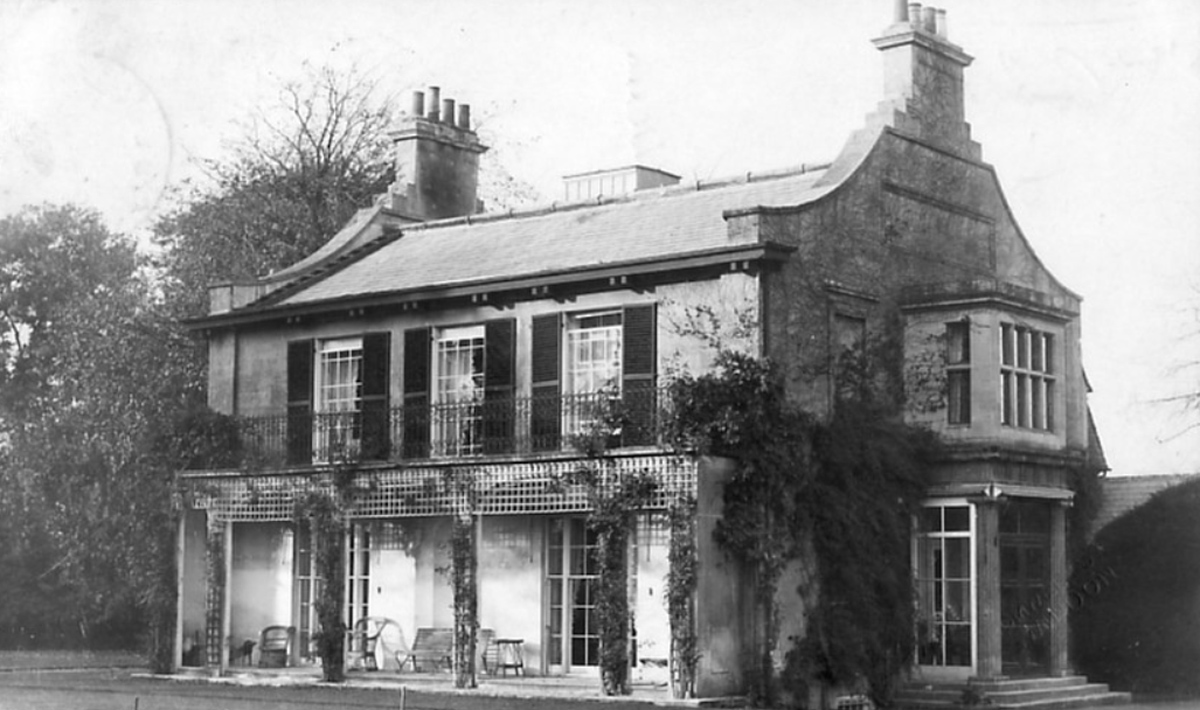
Chiseldon House circa 1910

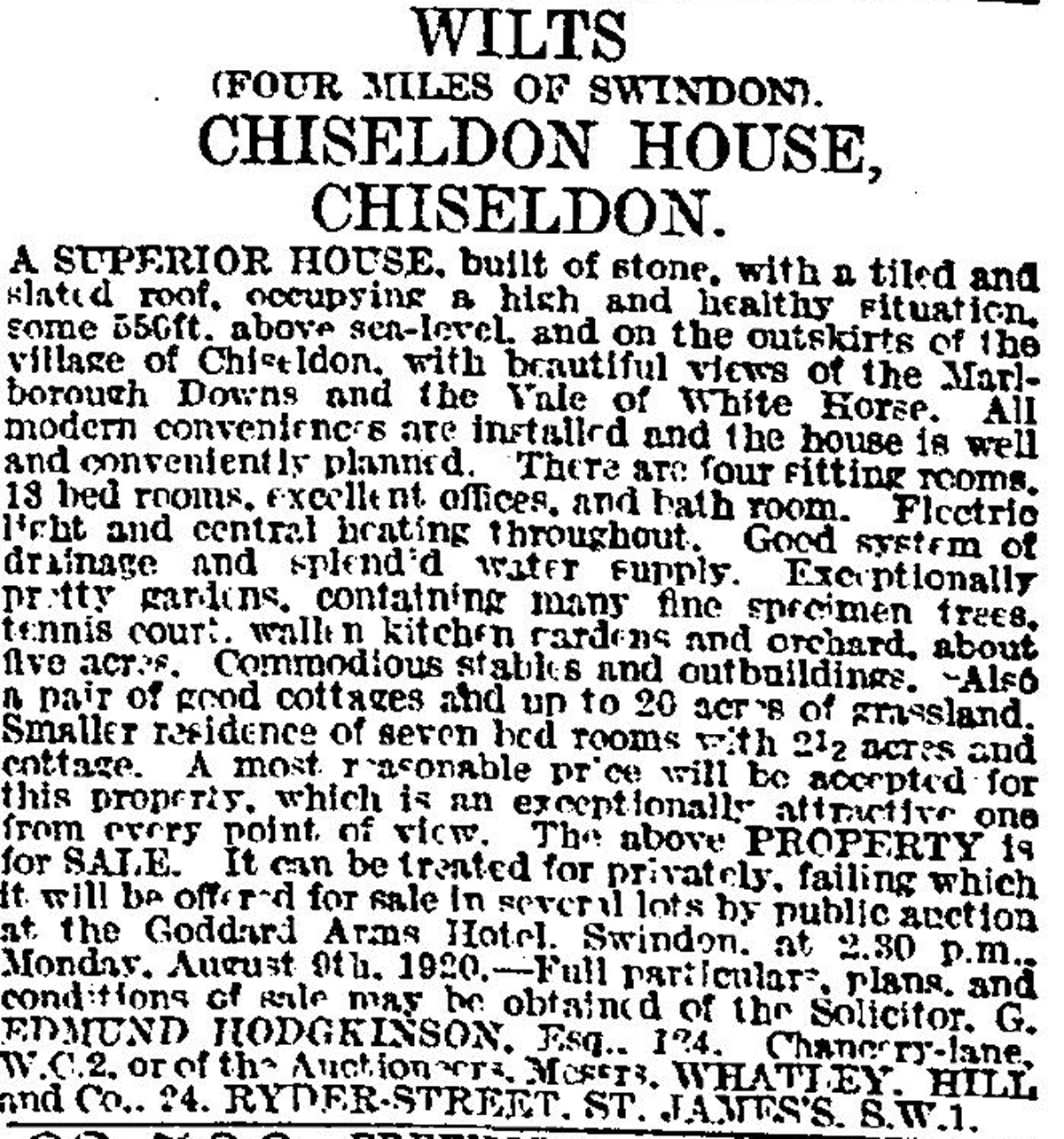
Sale notice, 1920

One of the tenants of the house was Arthur Tremayne Buller (1850–1917) who was a land agent. He married Elinor Louisa Leyborne Popham in 1891, and shortly after, the couple moved into Chiseldon House and lived there for about ten years.

In 1901, William Edward Nicolson Browne – who still owned the property – put it on the market. The next resident was Lieutenant Lancelot Shute Tristram of the Welch Regiment. Soon after he left, the wealthy widow Annie Sharpe Waud. and her daughter Irene Winifred Waud came to live at the house. Annie sold the property in 1920 but her daughter appears to have remained there and become the housekeeper for the subsequent owners.

The most notable owner during this period was Gerald England Tunnicliffe (1890–1969) who took up residence in the 1920s and remained there for the next 40 years. He was born in 1890 in London. His father was John England Tunnicliffe who was a solicitor and partner in the firm Maude and Tunnicliffe on The Strand. Gerald was also educated to be a solicitor and worked in his father's firm. In 1928 he married Mary Williams in Kensington. He seems to have bought Chiseldon House as a country residence at first, but later retired there. He sold the house in 1964.
