= Ogbourne Maizey =

Hamlet in Wiltshire, England

Coordinates: 51.443°N 1.734°W

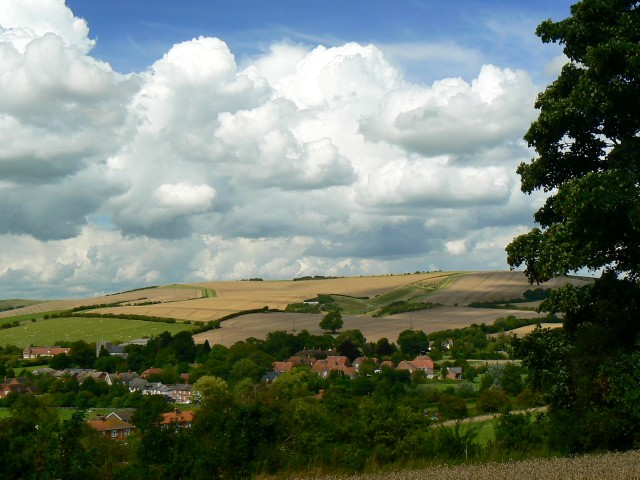
- A view from a byway near Ogbourne Maizey

- Location within Wiltshire
- Population: 77 (2011 Census)
- OS grid reference: SU186716
- Civil parish: Ogbourne St. Andrew
- Unitary authority: Wiltshire
- Ceremonial county: Wiltshire
- Region: South West
- Country: England
- Sovereign state: United Kingdom
- Post town: Marlborough
- Postcode district: SN8
- Dialling code: 01672
- Police: Wiltshire
- Fire: Dorset and Wiltshire
- Ambulance: South Western
- UK Parliament: East Wiltshire

Ogbourne Maizey is a hamlet in Wiltshire, England 1.6 miles (2.6 km) north of the town of Marlborough and 0.4 miles (0.64 km) south of the village of Ogbourne St. Andrew.

The hamlet is in the civil parish of Ogbourne St. Andrew, on the banks of the River Og. A map of 1773 shows an almost continuous ribbon of buildings along the river between Ogbourne Maizey and Ogbourne St. Andrew. Today the hamlet consists of commuter housing and racehorse stables on the narrow road that leads over the downs to Rockley. Local primary-level children usually go to the school in Ogbourne St. George or to Marlborough.

The hamlet has no church but is part of the Ridgeway Benefice that also includes Rockley, Ogbourne St. Andrew, Ogbourne St. George and Chiseldon.

The 10,894 square feet (1,012.1 m^{2}) Ogbourne Maisey House dates from the 16th century and is Grade II* listed.
