= Swindon's Bus Company =

Bus operator in Swindon, England

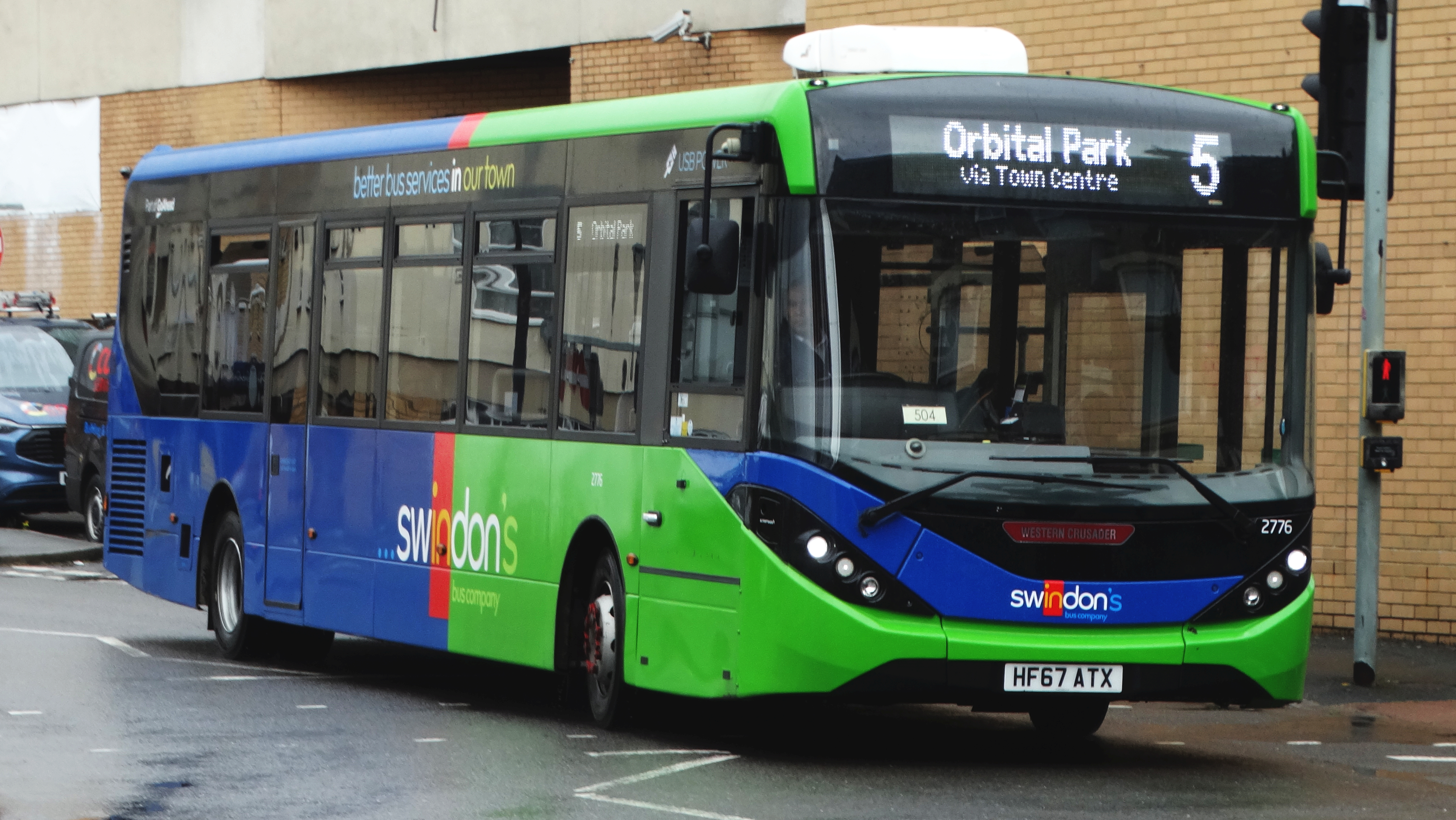
- Alexander Dennis Enviro200 MMC in the town centre in June 2025
- Parent: Go-Ahead Group
- Founded: September 1904
- Headquarters: Swindon
- Service area: Swindon
- Service type: Bus services
- Fleet: 110 (September 2026)
- Chief executive: Ben Murray (Interim)
- Website: www.swindonbus.co.uk

Swindon's Bus Company (formerly Thamesdown Transport) is a bus operator in England, serving Swindon and the surrounding area. Previously owned by Swindon Borough Council, ownership passed to the Go-Ahead Group in February 2017 and the operation was rebranded as Thamesdown...Swindon's bus company, later simply Swindon's bus company.

== History ==
The final logo of Thamesdown Transport, used until 2017

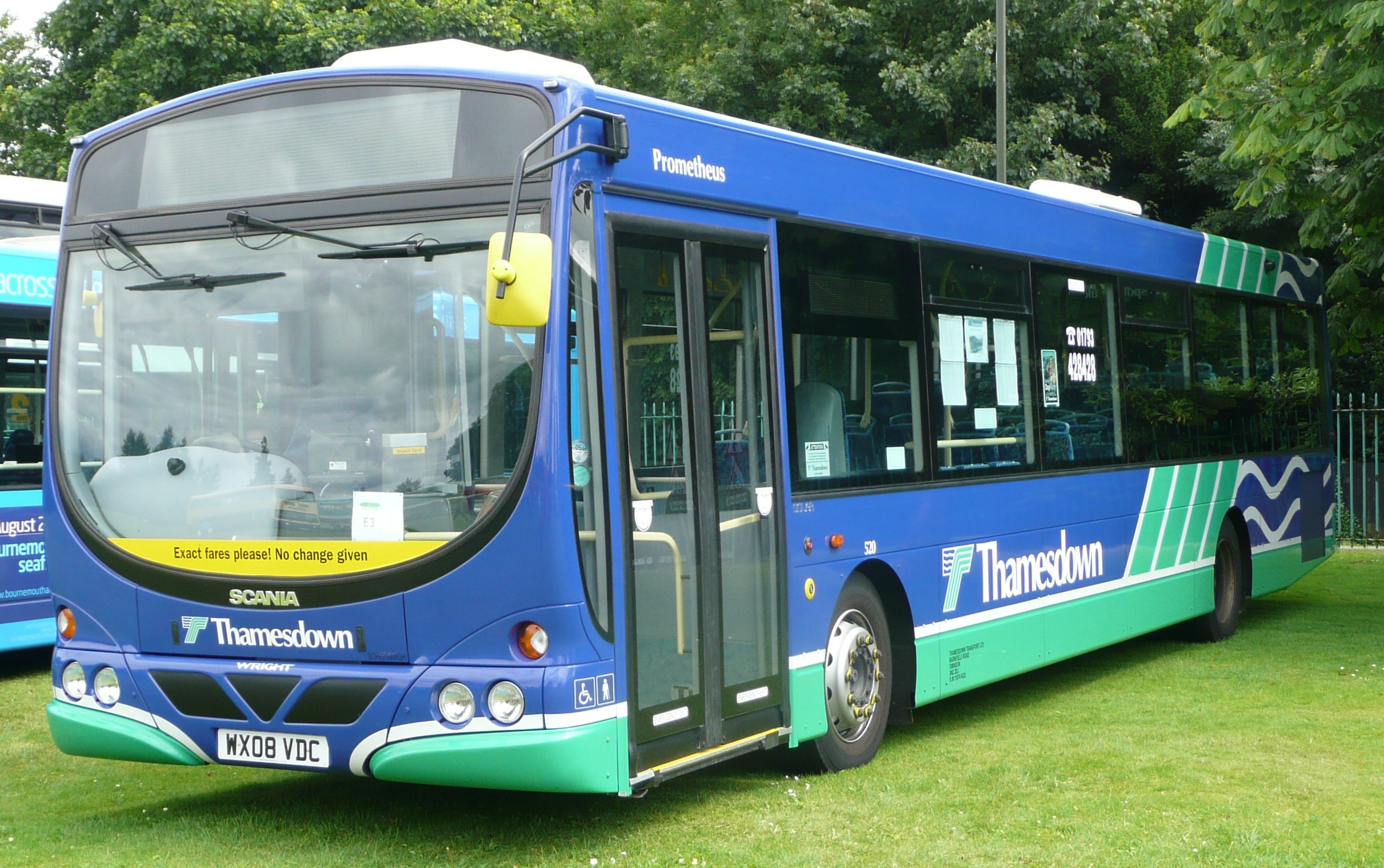
Thamesdown Transport Wright Solar bodied Scania K230UB at the 2008 Alton bus rally at Anstey Park

Thamesdown Transport had its origins in 1904, when Swindon Corporation started to operate electric trams. Bus operation started in 1927, and two years later all the trams were replaced.

On local government re-organisation in April 1974, the functions of the corporation were transferred to the new Thamesdown district, and the name of the bus operation was changed to Thamesdown Transport. A blue, green and white livery was used. During the 1980s, operations were expanded to rural areas around Swindon, to replace services withdrawn by Alder Valley and Bristol Omnibus Company.

To comply with the Transport Act 1985, the operation was transferred into a separate legal entity. Swindon Borough Council retained ownership from 1986 until the company was sold to the Go-Ahead Group in February 2017, and was integrated into its Go South Coast subsidiary. At that time the fleet consisted of 85 buses.

From April 2017, the branding "Swindon's bus company" was employed, together with a new livery in green and blue, with red and yellow highlights.

== Fares ==
Thamesdown implemented a fastFare system on 1 August 2005 in which passengers must pay the exact fare as change will not be given by the driver. This has generated some criticism as its implementation often results in passengers paying more than the necessary fare. This can be due to not having the correct change or, more commonly, tourists and visitors being unaware of the policy until after they have deposited money. The reasoning behind the policy is that if the driver does not have to deal with giving change, passenger loading times are shortened, resulting in a faster and more reliable service. It also reduces the risk of attacks on drivers. This policy was scrapped in 2017, when Thamesdown Transport was sold to Go South Coast.

Thamesdown has also implemented a Text and Go service, where passengers can send an SMS message containing a seven digit bus stop identifier to a premium number to receive information about the next three buses due to arrive at that stop.

Since Go South Coast has taken over, they have introduced new ways to buy tickets. Contactless payments have been introduced, and in 2018, the Clickit2ride app was made available, in common with the rest of Go South Coast. The app can be used to purchase time-defined tickets, but not single or return tickets. The app produces a QR code, which is scanned by the bus's ticket machine..

== Fleet and depot ==
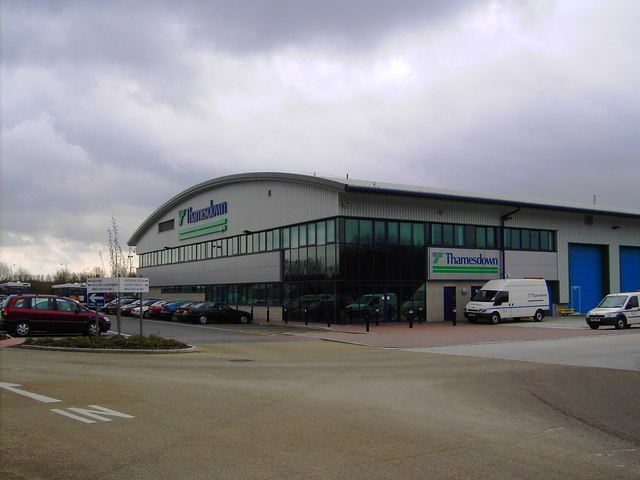
Depot on Barnfield Road in March 2007

As of 2026, the Swindon's Bus Company fleet consisted of 84 buses.

The company is based from a depot on Barnfield Road on the outskirts of Swindon town centre, capable of accommodating up to 134 buses. This depot, costing £4.6 million to build, opened in July 2005 to replace Thamesdown's original depot on Corporation Street, which first opened as a Swindon Corporation Tramways depot in 1903 and was subsequently demolished following the move to Barnfield Road.

== See also ==
- Buses in Swindon
- List of bus operating companies
