= Chiseldon railway station =

Former railway station in Wiltshire, England

Coordinates: 51.51696°N 1.73195°W

Chiseldon
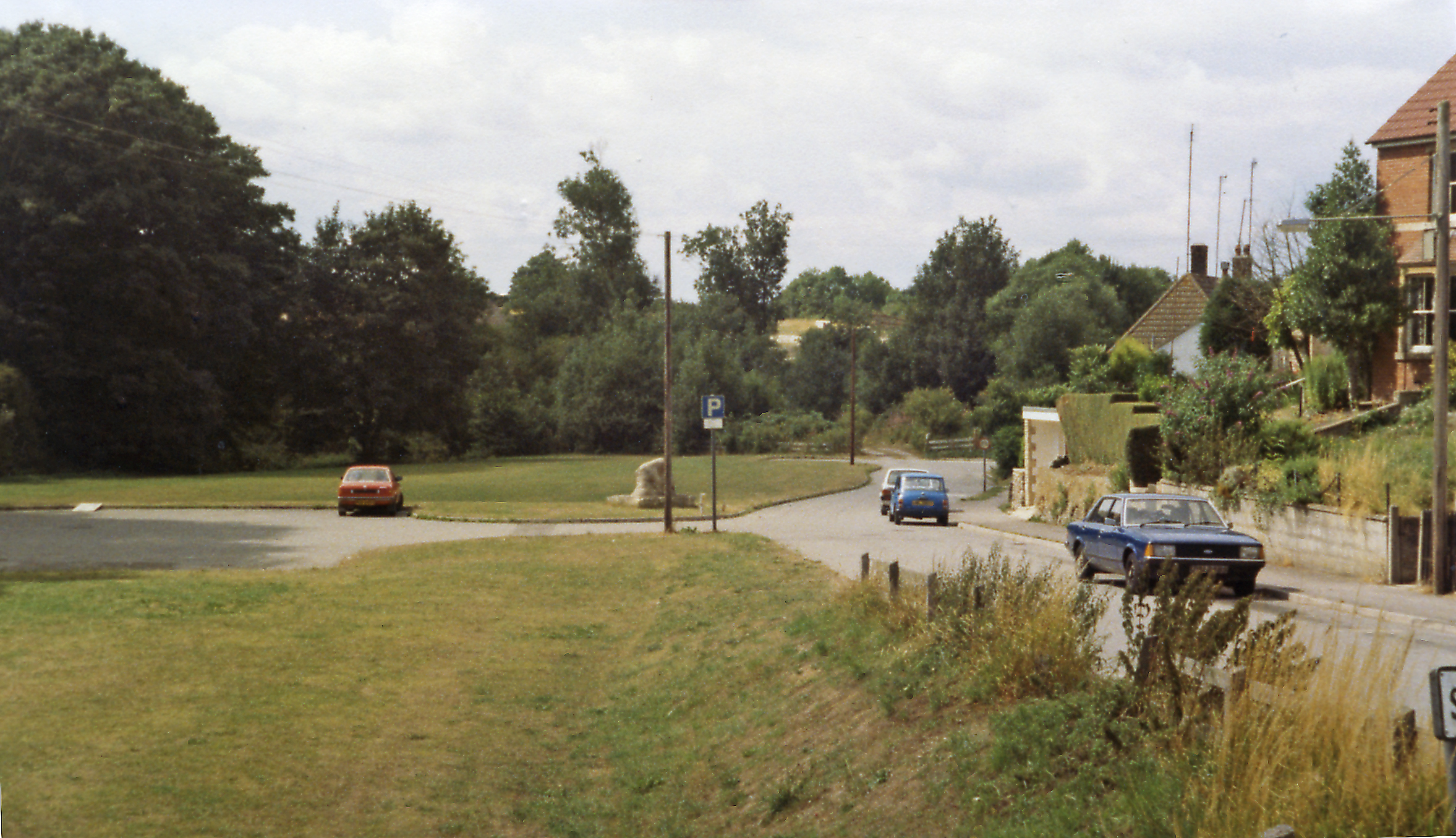
- Site of the station in 1984

General information
- Location: England

Other information
- Status: Disused

History
- Original company: Swindon, Marlborough and Andover Railway
- Pre-grouping: Midland and South Western Junction Railway

Key dates
- 27 July 1881: Opened
- 11 September 1961: Closed
Location

Chiseldon railway station was on the Midland and South Western Junction Railway in Wiltshire.

== History ==
The station opened on 27 July 1881 on the Swindon Town to Marlborough section of the Swindon, Marlborough and Andover Railway. In 1883, a northwards extension – the Swindon and Cheltenham Extension Railway – opened from Swindon Town to Cirencester, with further northward extension to a junction with the Great Western Railway's Cheltenham to Banbury line at Andoversford opening in 1891, enabling through trains from the Midlands to the south, through Chiseldon. The SM&AR and the S&CER had in 1884 amalgamated to form the M&SWJR.

The station was on a curved section of track in the middle of the village of Chiseldon, and was for many years busy with both goods traffic, primarily agricultural, and passengers. In the First World War a long siding was built southward to a nearby army site, at first called Draycott Camp (though the nearest village to it is now spelt as Draycot Foliat) and later Chiseldon Camp. In the Second World War too the area was the site of considerable military activity, though by then a small halt, Chiseldon Camp Halt, had been built on the line about a mile south of Chiseldon station to serve the military.

As a whole, traffic on the M&SWJR fell steeply after the Second World War and the line closed to passengers in 1961, with goods facilities withdrawn from this section of the line at the same time. No trace of the station now remains.

== Route ==
Preceding station	Disused railways	Following station
Swindon Town	Midland and South Western Junction Railway; Swindon, Marlborough and Andover Railway	Chiseldon Camp Halt
