= Chiseldon Camp railway station =

Former railway station in Wiltshire, England

Chiseldon Camp Halt
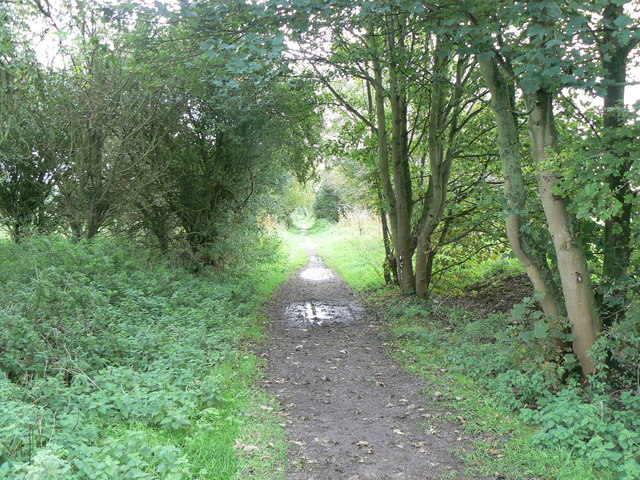
- View from the site of Chiseldon Camp Halt towards the south

General information
- Location: Chiseldon, Wiltshire; England
- Coordinates: 51.50240°N 1.72086°W
- Grid reference: SU193782
- Platforms: 1

Other information
- Status: Disused

History
- Original company: Great Western Railway
- Post-grouping: Great Western Railway

Key dates
- 1 December 1930: Opened
- 11 September 1961: Closed
Location

Chiseldon Camp Halt was a small railway station on the Midland and South Western Junction Railway line, south of Swindon in Wiltshire, England, between 1930 and 1961.

== History ==
Chiseldon village was provided with a station when the line opened as the Swindon, Marlborough and Andover Railway in 1881, and during the First World War a long siding was built from the station to the army establishment at Draycot Foliat which was later known as Chiseldon Camp.

In 1930, with the M&SWJR having been taken over by the Great Western Railway and with greater competition from road transport, a halt was opened on the main line itself about half a mile from the camp. The station was a single platform with a shelter, and it was unstaffed and run from Chiseldon station.

In the Second World War, American forces were stationed in large numbers at Chiseldon Camp, where they built a hospital. The line was extensively used for military transportation, as it linked the Midlands to the south.

Traffic on the M&SWJR fell steeply after the war and the line closed to passengers in 1961, with goods facilities withdrawn from this section of the line at the same time. No trace of the station now remains; the trackbed is part of the National Cycle Network.

== Route ==
Preceding station	Disused railways	Following station
Chiseldon	Midland and South Western Junction Railway; Swindon, Marlborough and Andover Railway	Ogbourne

== Sources ==
- Wiltshire Railway Stations, Mike Oakley, Dovecote Press, Wimborne, 2004, ISBN 1-904349-33-1 pp.39–40
