= Ogbourne St Andrew =

Village in Wiltshire, England

Coordinates: 51.449°N 1.729°W

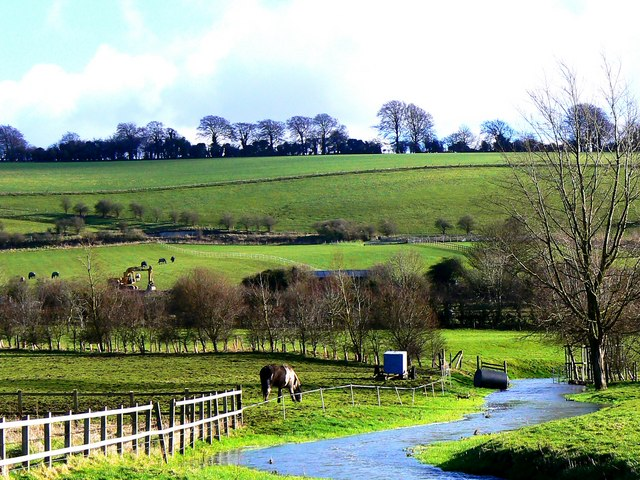
- River Og, Ogbourne St Andrew

- Location within Wiltshire
- Population: 417 (in 2011)
- OS grid reference: SU189723
- Civil parish: Ogbourne St Andrew
- Unitary authority: Wiltshire
- Ceremonial county: Wiltshire
- Region: South West
- Country: England
- Sovereign state: United Kingdom
- Post town: Marlborough
- Postcode district: SN8
- Dialling code: 01672
- Police: Wiltshire
- Fire: Dorset and Wiltshire
- Ambulance: South Western
- UK Parliament: East Wiltshire
- Website: Parish Council

Ogbourne St Andrew is a civil parish and small village in Wiltshire, England, 2 miles (3.2 km) north of Marlborough. The parish is on the banks of the River Og and includes the hamlets of Ogbourne Maizey and Rockley.

== History ==
Domesday Book of 1086 recorded a relatively large settlement of 71 households at Ocheborne, corresponding to the later manors of St Andrew and St George. Ogbourne Priory was a dependency of Bec Abbey in Normandy from the 12th century until the early 15th; there may have been a priory building in the 13th century but later the priory existed only as a legal name for the administration of the Bec estates in England.

== Parish church ==
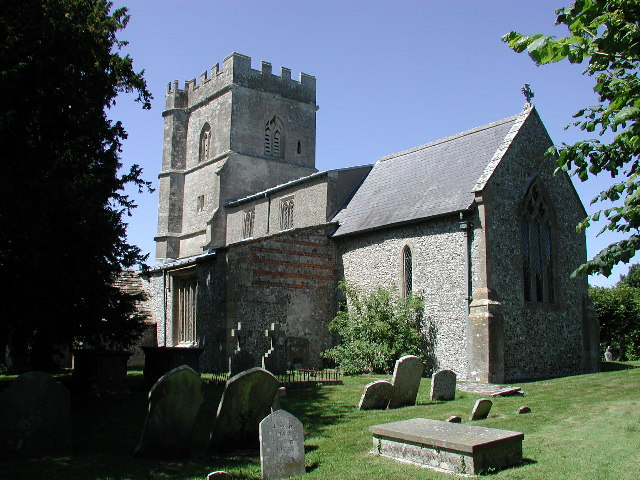
St Andrew's Church

The Anglican Church of St Andrew has 12th-century origins and work from that century survives in the north door (with chevron hoodmould) and details of the arcades; the piscina at the south side is a re-used capital. The chancel (with south door) was built in the 13th century. In the 15th century the west tower was inserted, and the church was re-roofed and the clerestory added.

The tower has a ring of five bells including a tenor cast c.1450. The church was restored by William Butterfield in 1847–49 and was recorded as Grade I listed in 1958. Today the parish is part of the Ridgeway Benefice which also covers Ogbourne St George and Chiseldon.

In the churchyard there is a round barrow, excavated in 1880 by Henry Cunnington.

== Other buildings ==
Rockley had a chapel of ease in the 13th century, dedicated to St Leonard; it was demolished in the 16th century. A new chapel of All Saints was built in 1872 and closed in 1961.

Rockley Manor dates from the 18th century and is Grade II* listed.

== Former railway ==
The Swindon, Marlborough and Andover Railway was built through the Og valley in 1881. Ogbourne station was at Ogbourne St George; a siding at Ogbourne St Andrew was used by the nearby horse stables. The line was closed in 1961.

== Amenities ==
Local primary-level children usually go to the school in Ogbourne St George or to Marlborough.
