= Rushey Platt railway station =

Former railway station in Wiltshire, England

Coordinates: 51.5522°N 1.8094°W

Rushey Platt
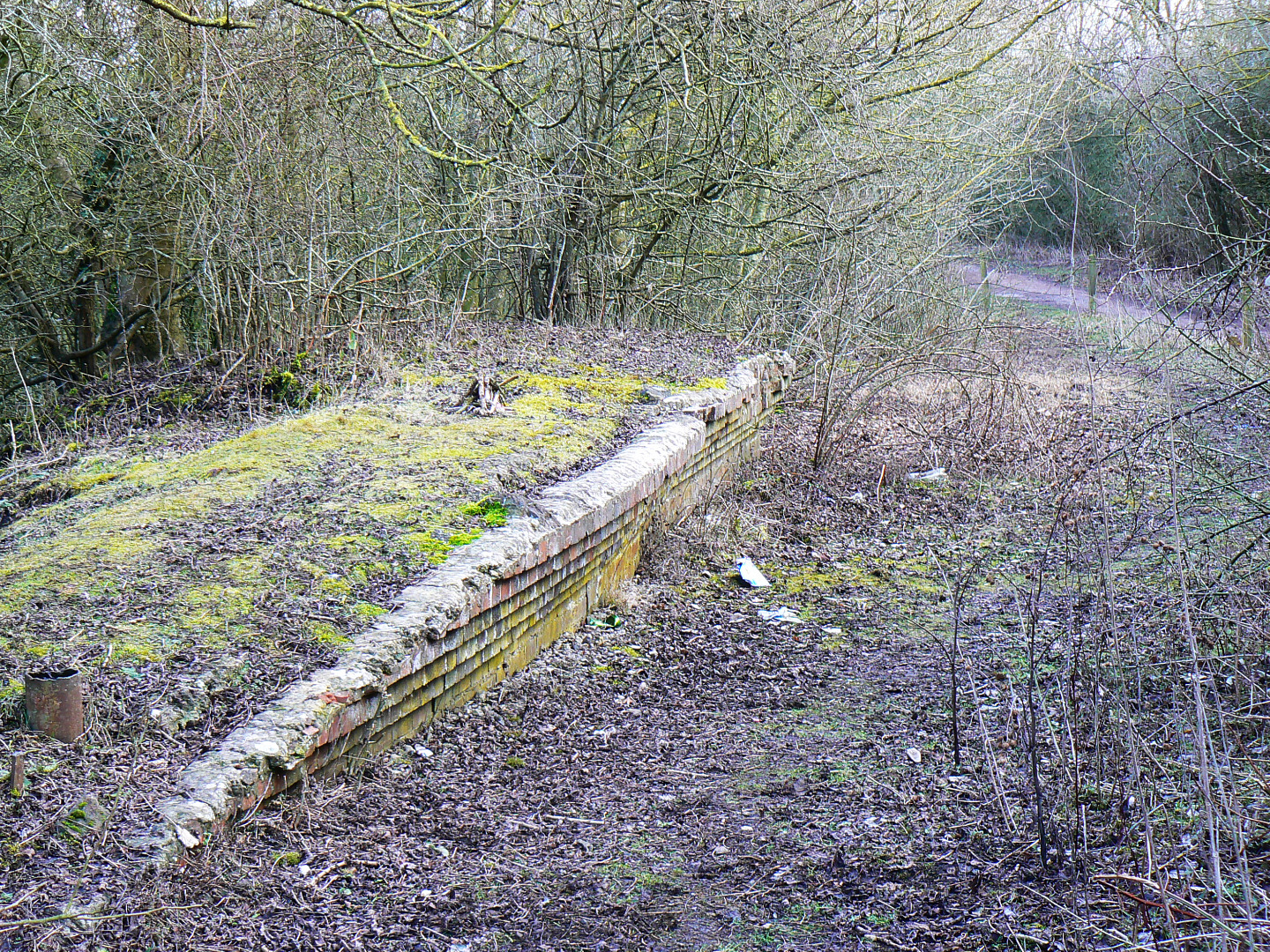
- The site of the station in 2010

General information
- Location: Swindon, Swindon; England
- System: Station on heritage railway
- Platforms: 4

History
- Original company: Swindon and Cheltenham Extension Railway
- Pre-grouping: Midland and South Western Junction Railway

Key dates
- 1883: opened
- 1905: closed to passengers
Location

Rushey Platt railway station is a former station on the Midland and South Western Junction Railway at Rushey Platt, south west of the centre of Swindon in Wiltshire.

The line was extended in 1882, and the station opened on 18 December 1883 on the Swindon and Cheltenham Extension Railway line from Swindon Town to the temporary terminus at Cirencester Watermoor. The S&CER line amalgamated in 1884 with the Swindon, Marlborough and Andover Railway to form the M&SWJR, and through services beyond Cirencester to the junction at Andoversford with the Great Western Railway's Cheltenham Lansdown to Banbury line, which had opened in 1881, started in 1891. An additional loop for goods traffic opened in 1921.

Rushey Platt was at the junction where the 1883 S&CER line branched off from the SM&AR link line between Swindon Town railway station and the main Great Western Railway station at Swindon. It had platforms on both the through S&CER line and the link, but the service between the two Swindon stations ceased after March 1885 because of the high fees the GWR charged the M&SWJR to run over its tracks, and that part of the station closed only 15 months after it had opened.

Passenger services at the through platforms of the station lasted only a further 20 years and were withdrawn in 1905: the station closed on 1 October 1905, the first station on the line to close to passengers. However, the station remained open for goods traffic, mainly milk, until the M&SWJR line closed to goods in 1964, and a private siding lasted even longer.

The railway embankment is still visible and all that remains of the station is a very weathered upper platform. The rest of the station has disappeared through time and development, and some of the site has been replaced by part of an industrial warehouse in Swindon's Rushey Platt Industrial Park.

The route of the former railway can still be seen with bridges at Mill Lane and Redpost Road.

== Route ==
Preceding station	Disused railways	Following station
Moredon Halt	Midland and South Western Junction Railway; Swindon & Cheltenham Extension Railway; Swindon, Marlborough and Andover Railway	Swindon Town
