= River Og =

River in Wiltshire, England

Og
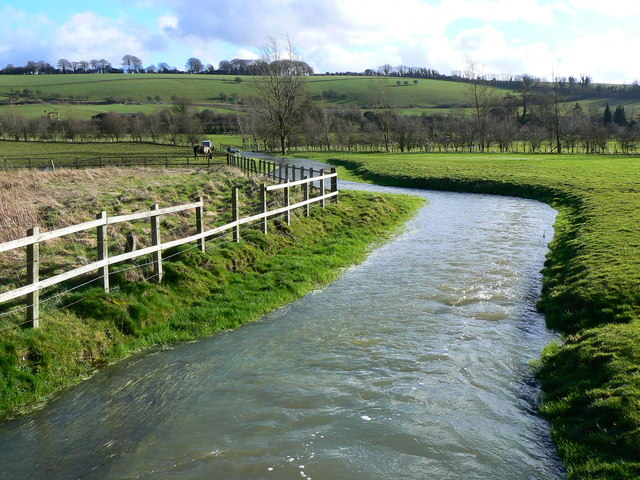
- River Og, near Ogbourne St Andrew.

Location
- Country: England
- County: Wiltshire

Physical characteristics
- Source
  - location: Draycot Foliat, Swindon
  - coordinates: 51°29′53″N 1°44′25″W
- Mouth
  - location: Marlborough
  - coordinates: 51°25′13″N 1°43′43″W
- Length: 3.1 km (1.9 mi)

The River Og is a chalk stream in Wiltshire, England.

It rises near the hamlet of Draycot Foliat, and flows south for about 3.1 km (1.9 miles) through Ogbourne St George, Ogbourne St Andrew and Ogbourne Maizey to the eastern edge of Marlborough, where it joins the River Kennet.

The river flows through a gap in the Marlborough Downs, which creates a natural transport route, now followed by the A346 and once used by the Midland and South Western Junction Railway.

The Og's name is a back-formation from Ogbourne, which itself means Occa's stream.
