= Ogbourne St George =

Village in Wiltshire, England

Coordinates: 51.468°N 1.713°W

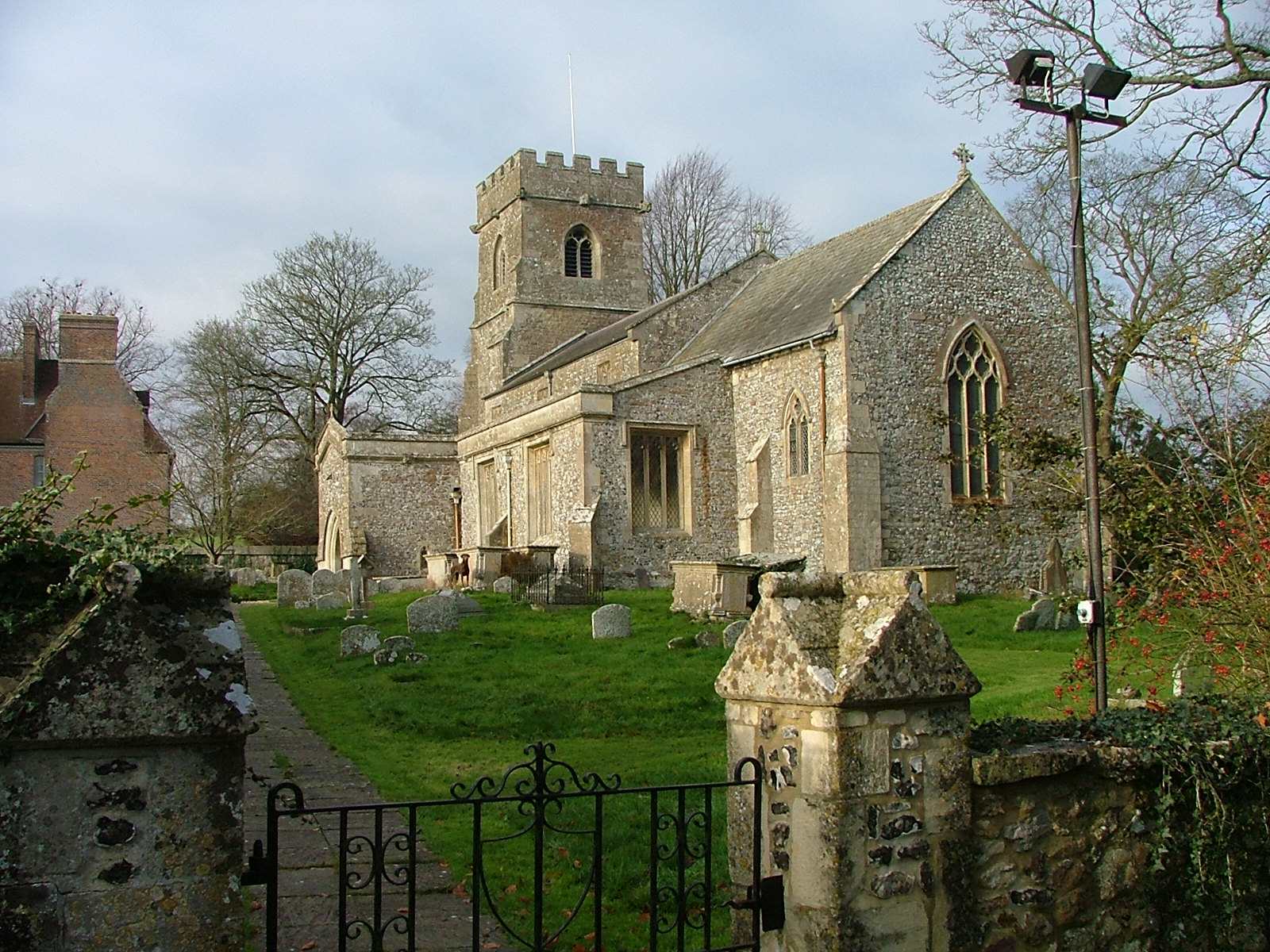
- St. George's parish church

- Location within Wiltshire
- Population: 495 (2011 census)
- OS grid reference: SU200744
- Civil parish: Ogbourne St George
- Unitary authority: Wiltshire
- Ceremonial county: Wiltshire
- Region: South West
- Country: England
- Sovereign state: United Kingdom
- Post town: Marlborough
- Postcode district: SN8
- Dialling code: 01672
- Police: Wiltshire
- Fire: Dorset and Wiltshire
- Ambulance: South Western
- UK Parliament: East Wiltshire
- Website: Parish Council

Ogbourne St George is a village and civil parish on the River Og about 3 miles (4.8 km) north of Marlborough, Wiltshire, England.

== History ==
Domesday Book of 1086 recorded a relatively large settlement of 71 households at Ocheborne, corresponding to the later manors of St Andrew and St George.

In the Middle Ages the manor of Ogbourne St George belonged to the Benedictine Abbey of Bec in Normandy. Ogbourne Priory was founded in about 1149 as a daughter house of the abbey. For some two hundred years the priory managed all the English estates belonging to the abbey.

During World War II, the address of the manor house was used atop a fictitious headed letter from 'Pam' to 'Major Martin' as a part of Operation Mincemeat, a disinformation strategy, the idea being that 'no German could resist the "Englishness" of such an address'.

== Buildings ==
The present manor house is built on the site of the priory and is Grade II* listed. The house is Jacobean and the date 1619 is inscribed on one of its chimneystacks. It received some Georgian remodelling, including the current glazing of its windows and probably the hipped roof.

The Church of England parish church of Saint George is also Grade II* listed and may be Norman in origin. The three-bay arcade of the south aisle is Early English Gothic and the arcade of the north aisle is slightly later. The church's windows and bell tower are Perpendicular Gothic additions from later in the Middle Ages. The tower has a ring of five bells, with an 18 hundredweight tenor tuned to E-flat. St. George's is now part of the Ridgeway Benefice along with the parishes of Chiseldon with Draycot Foliat and Ogbourne St Andrew with Rockley.

A 14th or 15th century barn at Hallam Farm is Grade I listed. A 17th-century cottage known as Applegarth, on the High Street, is Grade II* listed.

== Former railway ==
The Swindon, Marlborough and Andover Railway was built through the parish and opened in 1881, with a station at Ogbourne. The railway company later renamed itself the Midland and South Western Junction Railway. It was made part of the Great Western Railway in 1923. British Railways, into which GWR had been assimilated, closed the line through Ogbourne station in 1961.

Part of the line has been obliterated in the Ogbourne St George district by the realignment of the A346, but most of the trackbed is now part of National Cycle Route 482, between Chiseldon and Marlborough.

== Amenities ==
The 17th-century Old Crown Inn was a coaching inn and is currently called the Inn with the Well. The village had another public house which has been converted into the Parklands Hotel.

Ogbourne St George & St Andrew Voluntary Controlled Church of England Primary School serves Ogbourne St George, Ogbourne St Andrew, Ogbourne Maizey, Rockley and smaller numbers of pupils from Marlborough.

The Ridgeway National Trail passes close to the village.

== Sources & further reading ==
- A.P. Baggs; Jane Freeman; Janet H. Stevenson (1983). Crowley, D.A. (ed.). Victoria County History: A History of the County of Wiltshire, Volume 12: Ramsbury and Selkley hundreds; the borough of Marlborough. pp. 151–160.
- Pevsner, Nikolaus (1975) [1963]. Cherry, Bridget (ed.). The Buildings of England: Wiltshire. Harmondsworth: Penguin Books. p. 366. ISBN 0-14-071026-4.
- Lobel, Mary D, ed. (1959). A History of the County of Oxford: Volume 6. Victoria County History. pp. 103–116.
