= Swindon Corporation Tramways =

On-street rail service in Wiltshire, England (1904–1929)

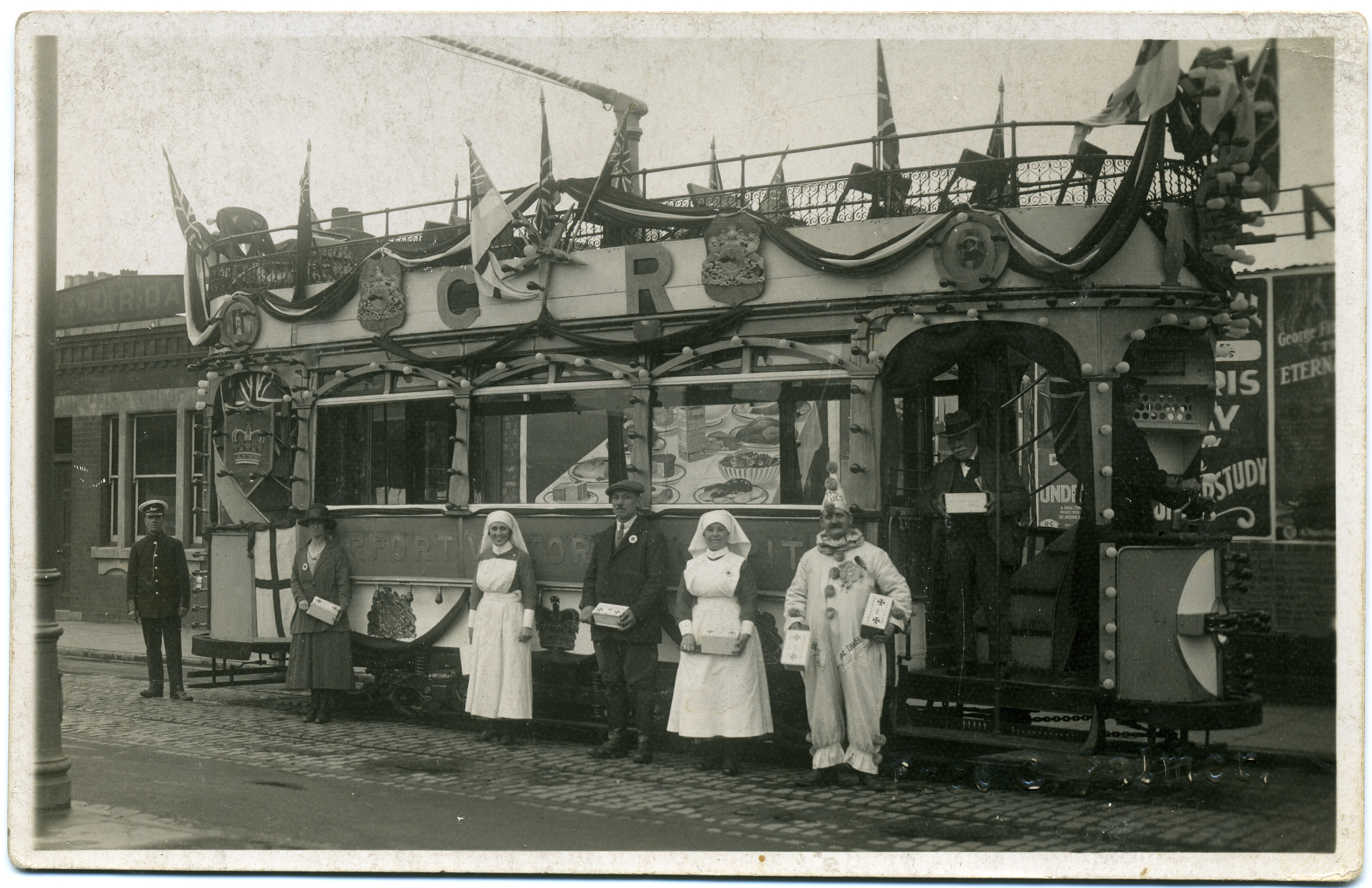
- Decorated tram on Fleet Street in Swindon

Operation
- Locale: Swindon, England
- Open: 22 September 1904
- Close: 11 July 1929
- Status: Closed

Infrastructure
- Track gauge: 3 ft 6 in (1,067 mm)
- Propulsion system: Electric

Statistics
- Route length: 3.7 miles (6.0 km)

Swindon Corporation Tramways operated an electric passenger tramway service in Swindon between 1904 and 1929.

== History ==
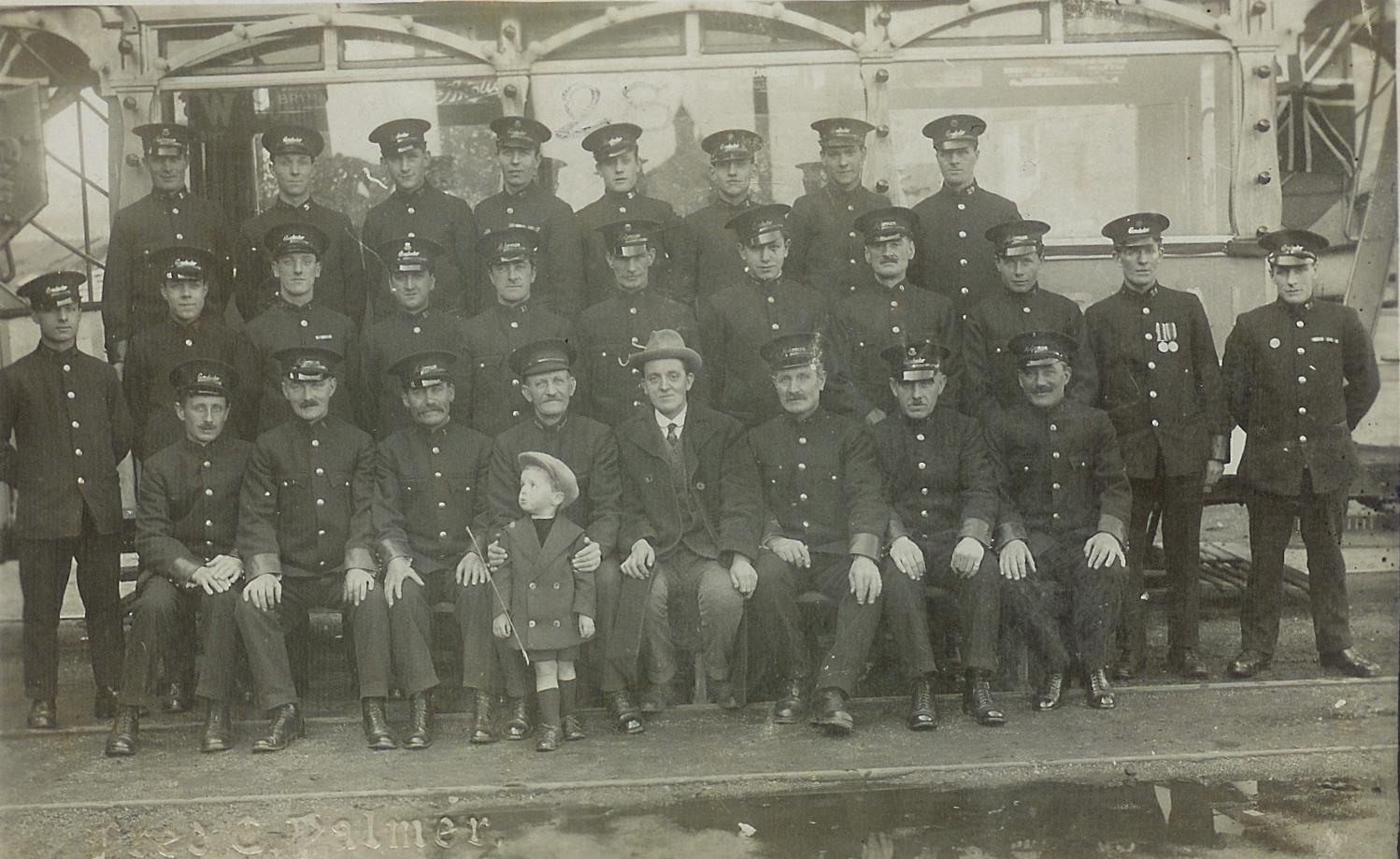
Portrait photo of a group of tram drivers and personnel at Swindon, Wiltshire, England in 1924-25. The photographer was Fred C. Palmer of Tower Studio, Herne Bay, Kent ca.1905-1916, and of 6 Cromwell Street, Swindon ca.1920-1936.

Swindon Corporation was the local council formed by the 1901 municipal borough charter, with the amalgamation of the Old and New Swindon councils; a power station was built in Corporation Street. On the same site at SU 1522 8503 was the tram depot.

The corporation started to operate electric trams in 1904. A total of 3.75 miles (6.04 km) of 3 ft 6 in (1.07 m) gauge track was laid down from the Great Western Railway Station to Rodbourne, Gorse Hill and the Market Square in Old Town. A small fleet of nine 48 seater trams were bought at the time of inception with four further cars purchased at a later date.

In 1906, the Swindon tram disaster occurred. A number 11 tram taking passengers from the Bath and West Show being held in Old Town suffered brake failure driving down Victoria Hill and crashed in Regents Circus killing 5.

== Closure ==
After only 25 years of operation, Swindon's trams were phased out by buses in 1929.

Tramcar 13 survived and is under restoration.
