= Chiseldon =

Coordinates: 51°30′58″N 1°43′52″W

- Village and civil parish
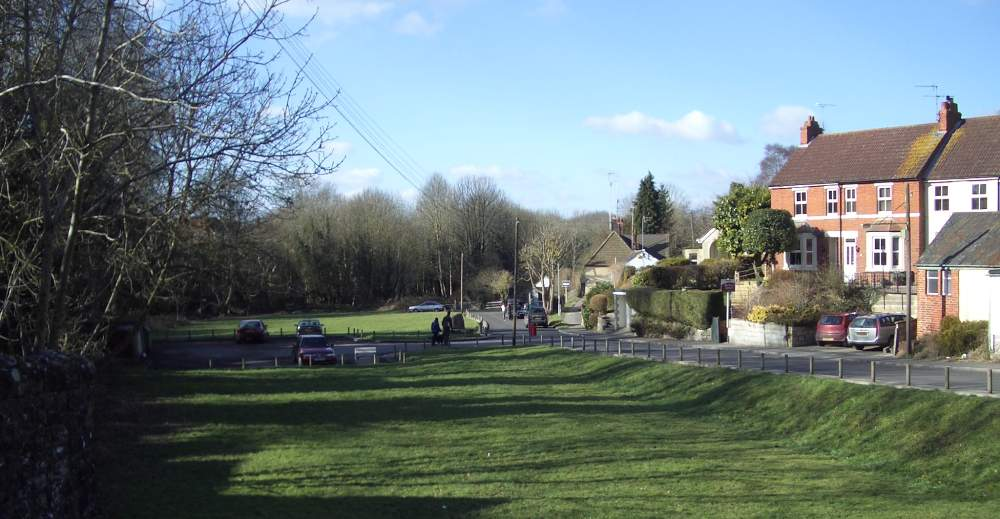
- Chiseldon Green

- Location within Wiltshire
- Population: 2,548 (2021 census)
- OS grid reference: SU188797
- Civil parish: Chiseldon
- Unitary authority: Swindon
- Ceremonial county: Wiltshire
- Region: South West
- Country: England
- Sovereign state: United Kingdom
- Post town: SWINDON
- Postcode district: SN4
- Dialling code: 01793
- Police: Wiltshire
- Fire: Dorset and Wiltshire
- Ambulance: South Western
- UK Parliament: East Wiltshire
- Website: Parish Council

Chiseldon is a village and civil parish in the Borough of Swindon, Wiltshire, England. The village lies on the edge of the Marlborough Downs, a mile south of junction 15 of the M4 motorway, on the A346 between Swindon and Marlborough. The large village of Wroughton is 2.5 miles (4 km) to the west. The parish includes the hamlets of Badbury, Badbury Wick, Draycot Foliat, Hodson, and Ridgeway View; the ancient manor of Burderop is also within the parish.

== History ==
Settlements in the area date back to prehistoric and Roman times, but Chiseldon itself was started by the Saxons. The Domesday Book of 1086 recorded a large settlement of 70 households at Chiseldene. It takes its name from the Old English cisel dene, or gravel valley. At one point the nearby hamlet of Draycot Foliat was larger than Chiseldon. Chiseldon lies on one of the country's oldest highways, the Icknield Way, although this section of the road is more commonly known as The Ridgeway.

The spelling "Chisledon" has also been used, and continues in the name of the ecclesiastical parish.

In 2004, a group of Iron Age cauldrons were discovered at a site close to the centre of the village. This unique find, the largest group of Iron Age cauldrons to be discovered in Europe, was excavated in June 2005 and again in 2010. Now thought to comprise 17 cauldrons, they were taken to the British Museum for conservation and research.

The Midland and South Western Junction Railway was constructed in 1881 and ran through the centre of the village until 1961, with a station that linked the village to Swindon Town station to the north and Marlborough to the south.

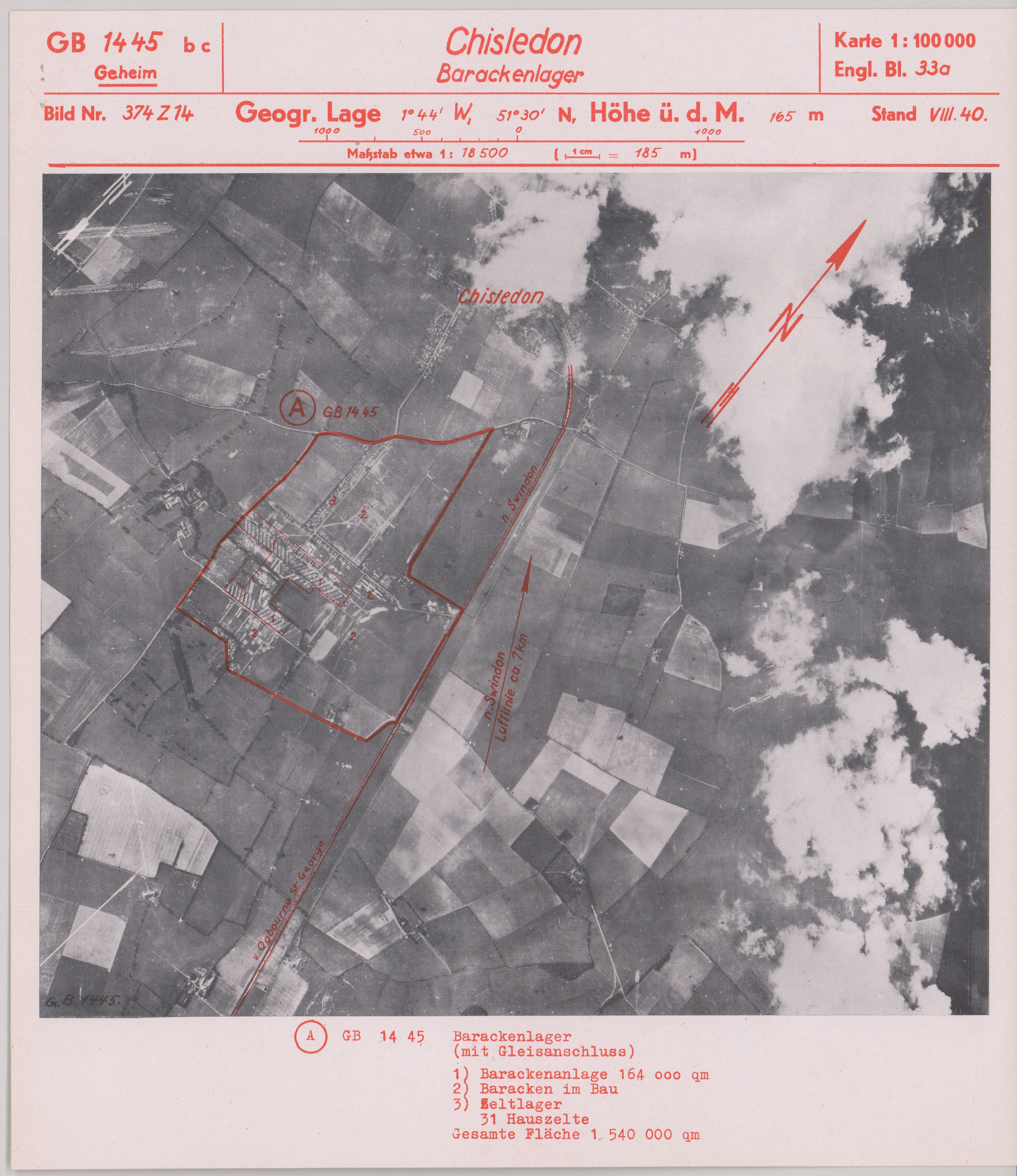
Chiseldon Army Camp on a target dossier of the German Luftwaffe, 1940

Chiseldon Army Camp was opened in 1914 and closed in 1962. During both World Wars it was heavily used as a training base for troops. A World War I soldier, Arthur Bullock, recorded overcrowding and appalling conditions, including, in the canteen, having to re-use tables and plates from a previous sitting, on which lay 'bones and chewed bits of gristle'. He also recalls being kept awake by a St Bernard dog, 'the mascot of the camp'. In World War II the camp was a major base for US Army troops. Houses which were formerly married quarters are now known as Ridgeway View.

An area in and around the village was designated as a Conservation Area in 1990.

The Chiseldon Local History Group maintains a website with information about the history of the village. They also organise a programme of lectures and have a museum in the village.

== Religious sites ==
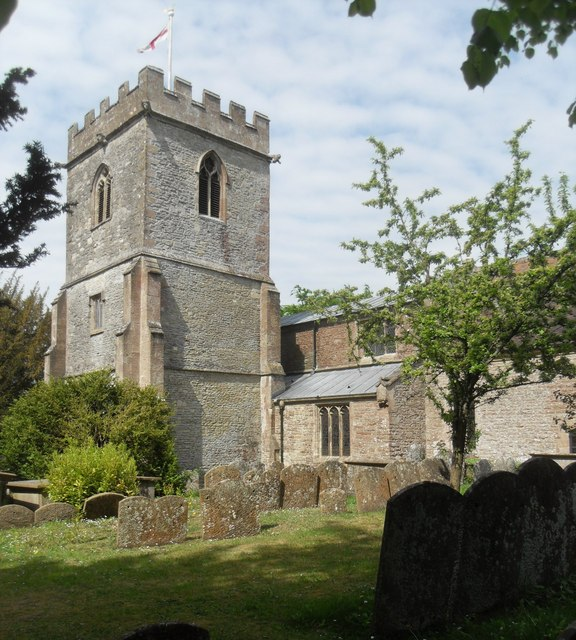
Holy Cross church

One record states that the church at Chiseldon was granted in 903 to Winchester Abbey. This association continued until the Dissolution, in or shortly before 1540.

Holy Cross, the Church of England parish church, is a Grade I listed building which is called "fairly large" by Historic England. The earliest masonry is the five-bay arcades of c.1200, and the south and east windows of the chancel are also from the early 13th century. The head of a small Anglo-Saxon window is built into a pier near the south-west corner of the nave. The windows on the west side are from the 13th or 14th centuries, as is the altered south doorway.

The three-stage 15th-century tower is in unusual position backing onto the south aisle, its base providing a porch. One of the six bells is from c.1399 and four are from the 17th century. Restoration by C.E. Ponting in 1892 saw the renewal of the stalls using 16th-century carved panels; the exterior was little changed beyond the replacement of the chancel roof at a steeper angle. The church has much stained glass from the late 19th century, and a 1939 window in the north aisle by Christopher Webb.

There are several wall monuments, 18th and 19th century, to members of the Calley family of Burderop. Stone memorials inside the church include a depiction of Edward Hellish (died 1707) and his large family. Historic England describes the churchyard as well stocked with chest tombs and headstones, mostly from the 18th century.

In 1923, the parishes and benefices of Chiseldon and Draycot Foliat were united. Today the parish of Chisledon with Draycott Folliatt [sic] is at the centre of the Ridgeway benefice, which also covers Ogbourne St Andrew and Ogbourne St George.

Primitive Methodists built a chapel and school in the village in 1896, replacing an earlier building. The chapel was sold for residential use sometime after 1967 and Methodists share the facilities of the parish church.

== The parish ==
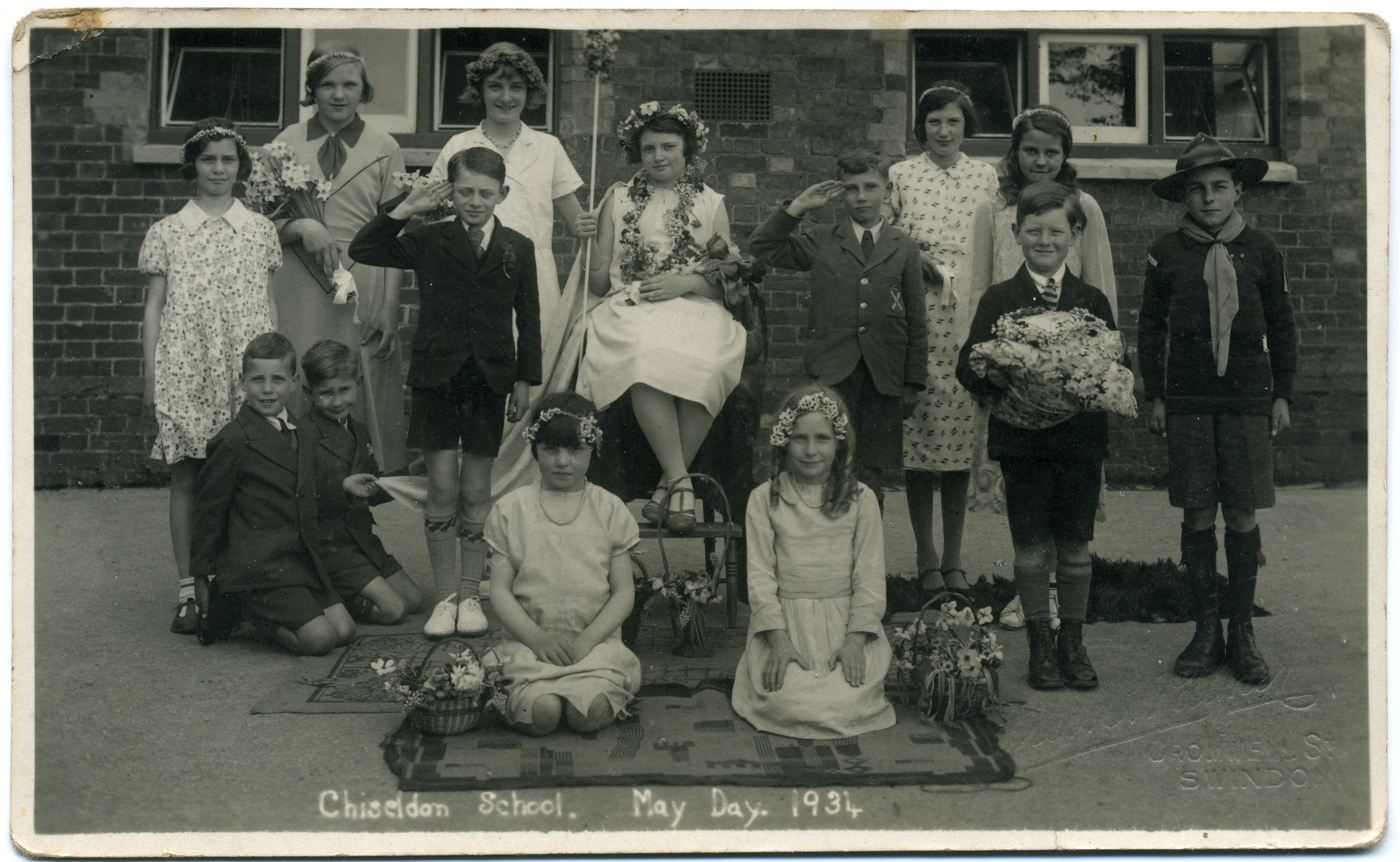
May Day at Chiseldon School 1934, by Fred C Palmer

The Parish of Chiseldon encompasses not only the village but also the neighbouring hamlets of Draycot Foliat and Hodson. Draycot Foliat had its own church and parish in the medieval period, but in 1571 the Bishop of Salisbury ordered the church in Draycot to be demolished, as neither parish could sustain their own rectors any longer. As Chiseldon was the larger, Draycot was incorporated into that parish, and the materials from the church in Draycot were used to repair the church in Chiseldon.

In 2017 a community governance review redrew the northern boundary of the parish to follow the M4, transferring the area to the north to the newly created Central Swindon South parish. This area included the former hamlet of Coate and the modern housing development of Badbury Park, on the southeastern edge of Swindon.

== Local government ==
As well as having its own elected parish council, Chiseldon also falls within the area of the Borough of Swindon unitary authority, which is responsible for all significant local government functions. It is part of the Chiseldon and Lawn ward for elections to Swindon Borough Council.

== Amenities ==
The village has a school, Chiseldon Primary School, which had 193 pupils in 2021. The village has a surgery, and two hotels, one of them Chiseldon House Hotel.

There are two pubs in the parish: the Patriot's Arms in the village, and the Plough Inn on the main road north of the village. There is also a social club.

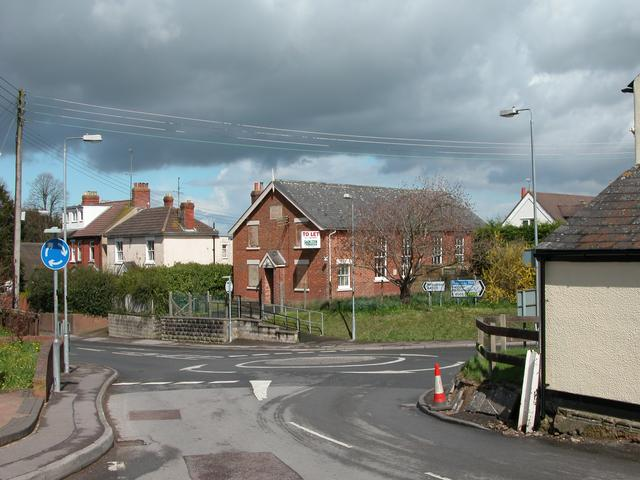
Oddfellows Hall

Local shops declined in the 20th century, as in many villages, due to people shopping in larger towns (Swindon) rather than in the village. Current local shops include a small newsagent, a hairdresser, a small supermarket and a petrol station. The supermarket was converted from a former army barracks.
