= Swindon Town railway station =

Former railway station in Wiltshire, England

Coordinates: 51.5495°N 1.7748°W

Swindon Town
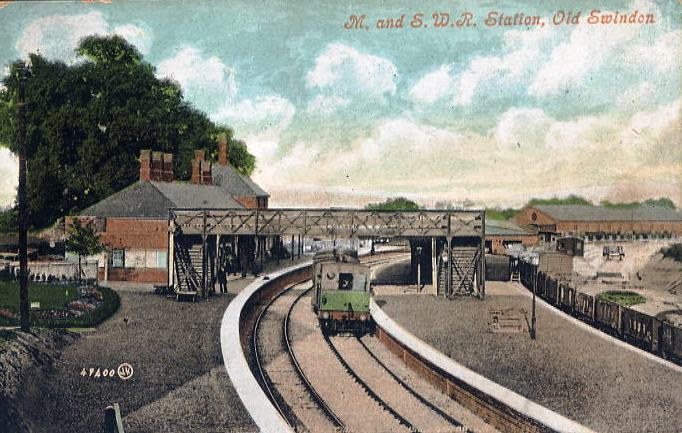
- The station in the early 1900s

General information
- Location: Swindon, Swindon; England
- Platforms: 2

Other information
- Status: Disused

History
- Original company: Swindon, Marlborough and Andover Railway
- Pre-grouping: Midland and South Western Junction Railway
- Post-grouping: Great Western Railway; Western Region of British Railways

Key dates
- 27 July 1881: Opened
- 11 September 1961: Closed to passengers
- 1 November 1966: Goods facilities withdrawn
- 1972: closed completely
Location

Swindon Town railway station was on the Midland and South Western Junction Railway at Swindon in Wiltshire, England. The station was open from 1881 to 1972, and was sited in the Old Town area about one-and-a-half miles from the Great Western Railway's Swindon Junction.

== History ==
Swindon Town was originally planned under the Swindon, Marlborough, and Andover Railway Act 1873 (36 & 37 Vict. c. cxciv) for a different site to the east of the eventual station, with a tunnel to be built under the hill on which the Old Town sits. But money ran out and the line was realigned to run south of the hill. The Swindon, Marlborough and Andover Railway opened between Swindon Town and Marlborough on 27 July 1881; in early 1882, the line was extended northwards from Swindon Town to a junction with the Great Western main line at Rushey Platt, and services were started between the two Swindon stations. Rushey Platt became a junction the following year with the opening of the Swindon and Cheltenham Extension Railway as far as Cirencester Watermoor.

The SM&AR and the S&CER combined to form the M&SWJR in 1884. Services between the two Swindon stations ceased in 1885 because of the high charges the GWR imposed on M&SWJR trains. Finally, the northern section of the M&SWJR was extended in 1891 from Cirencester to a junction with the GWR Banbury and Cheltenham Direct Railway line at Andoversford railway station, so that through-services could be run from the north to Southampton and the south coast.

Swindon Town was seen as the most important station on the line, and housed the M&SWJR's offices. There was a loop line, a locomotive turntable and a loco shed at the site. The loop line platform was used for the shuttle services to Swindon's GWR station when these were reinstated following the takeover of the M&SWJR by the GWR at the Grouping in 1923.

Swindon Town station was heavily used in early years, but increasingly suffered from the concentration of traffic at the main GWR station as the focus of the town shifted away from the Old Town area to the newer parts that developed around the GWR station and the railway works there. Passenger and goods traffic on the M&SWJR fell very steeply after the Second World War and the line closed to passengers in 1961. Goods facilities were withdrawn in 1966, although freight trains conveying materials for the construction of the M4 motorway continued until 1972 when the track was abandoned. The track was lifted around 1978.

== Route ==
Preceding station	Disused railways	Following station
Rushey Platt	Midland and South Western Junction Railway; Swindon, Marlborough and Andover Railway	Chiseldon

== Present day ==
The M&SWJR office building remains on the site, but much of the rest has disappeared under a trading estate. Part of the track alignment, Old Town Railway Cutting, has been opened as a railway path and nature trail.
