= Clatford =

Hamlet in Wiltshire, England

Coordinates: 51.415°N 1.771°W

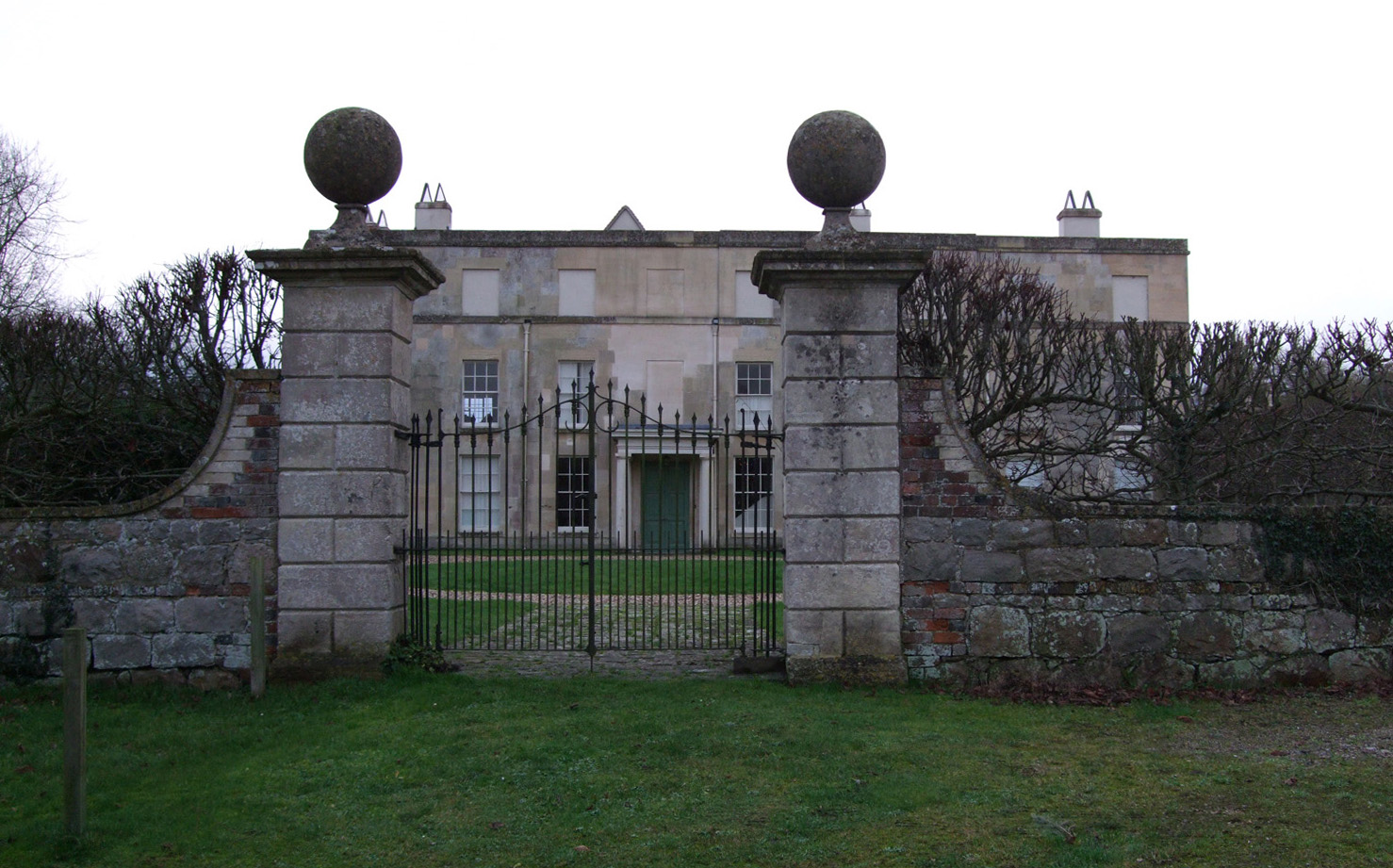
- Clatford Hall

- Location within Wiltshire
- OS grid reference: SU160685
- Civil parish: Preshute
- Unitary authority: Wiltshire
- Ceremonial county: Wiltshire
- Region: South West
- Country: England
- Sovereign state: United Kingdom
- Post town: Marlborough
- Postcode district: SN8
- Dialling code: 01672
- Police: Wiltshire
- Fire: Dorset and Wiltshire
- Ambulance: South Western
- UK Parliament: East Wiltshire

Clatford is a small hamlet (formerly a village) approximately 1 mile (1.6 km) west of the village of Manton and about 2 miles (3.2 km) west of Marlborough, which is the nearest town, in Wiltshire, England. It is just south of the River Kennet and the A4 primary route.

Early in the 12th century, Clatford manor was given to the Benedictine abbey of Saint-Victor-en-Caux (Saint-Victor-l'Abbaye, Seine-Maritime) together with land at Hullavington, some 18 miles (29 km) to the northwest. The small Clatford Priory, at times called Hullavington Priory, continued until the 15th century.

In the 14th century, Clatford was comparable in size with the neighbouring village of Manton; in 1801 there were 122 inhabitants. Today Clatford is a rural community made up of Clatford Hall with Clatford Farm, several houses clustered around a crossroads and several other houses spread further out.

Clatford Hall dates from the later 16th century and is Grade II* listed.

Clatford is in the civil parish of Preshute.

== See also ==
- Clatford Stone Circle
- West Woods
