= Cunetio =

Ancient walled town in Wiltshire, England

- Cunetio
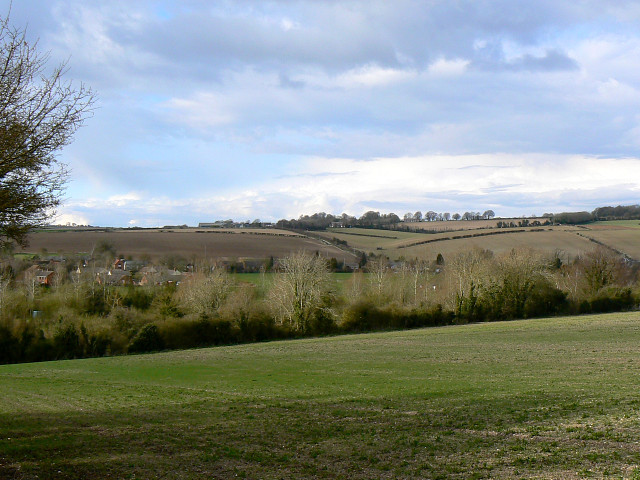
- Cunetio within the River Kennet valley

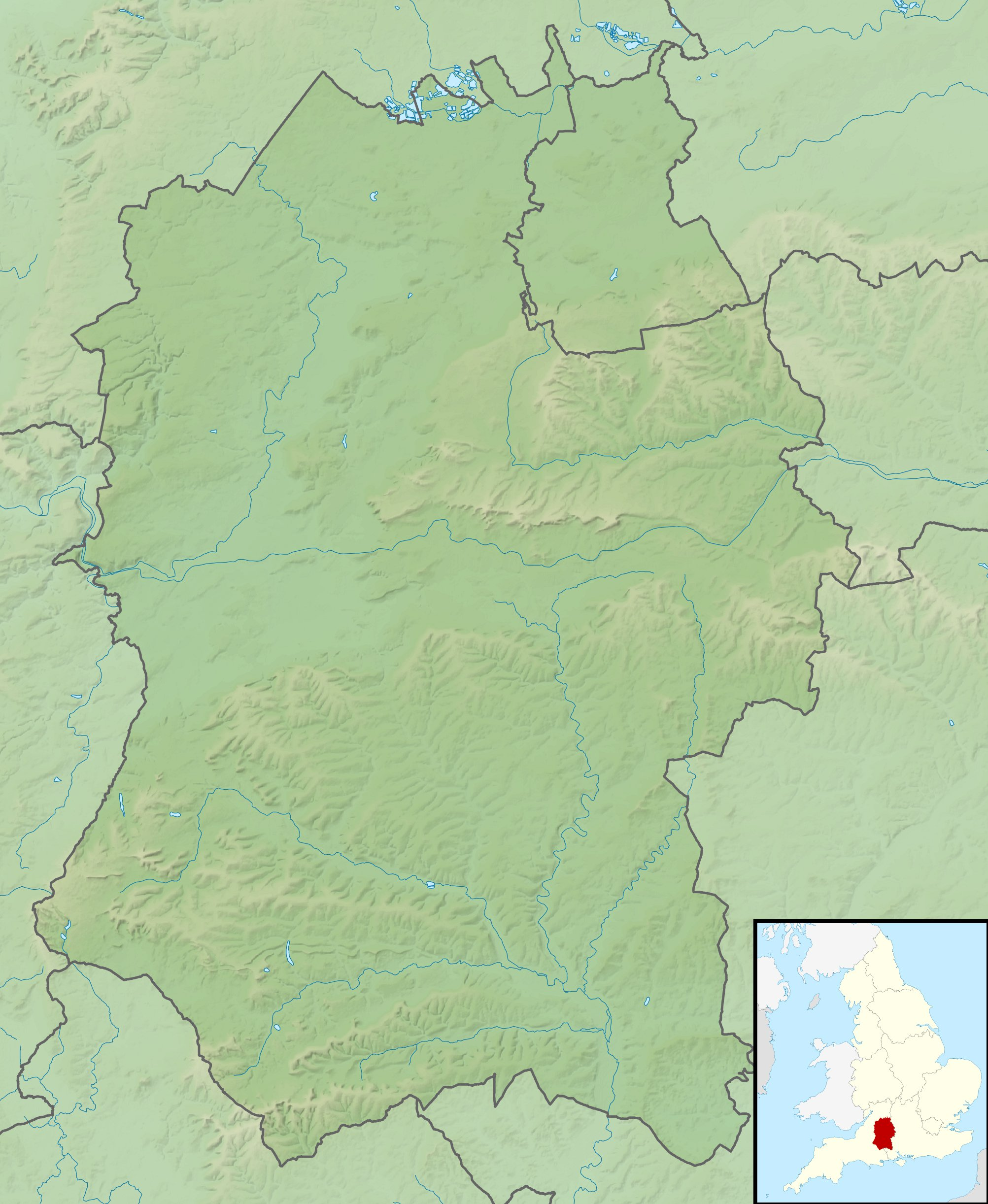
- Location of Cunetio in Wiltshire
- 51°25′25″N 1°41′26″W
- Type: Walled Settlement
- Periods: Roman Britain
- Cultures: Romano-British
- Location: Situated on a Roman road between Durocornovium and Venta Belgarum
- Region: Britannia
- Part of: Britannia Superior

History
- Built: 2nd century AD
- Abandoned: Late 5th century AD

Site notes
- Elevation: 130 m (430 ft)
- Length: 265 m (869 ft)
- Width: 213 m (699 ft)
- Area: 30 hectares (74 acres)
- Excavation dates: 1960 - 2000s
- Archaeologists: Wessex Archaeology; Time Team
- Discovered: 1940s
- Condition: no extant remains
- Management: Scheduled monument
- Public access: no

Cunetio was a large walled town in a valley of the River Kennet in modern-day Wiltshire, England. Occupied from the 2nd century AD by Romano-British people, the settlement was abandoned in the early 5th century, the emerging post-Roman period. It lay near what is now the village of Mildenhall, about 1 1/2 miles (2.4 km) east of the market town of Marlborough. Scholars were unaware of the site until it was rediscovered by aerial photos in the 1940s. Archaeological excavations subsequently revealed a substantial urban area defended by large masonry walls. Artefacts recovered from Cunetio have included kitchenware, personal effects, and two hoards of Roman coinage.

== History ==
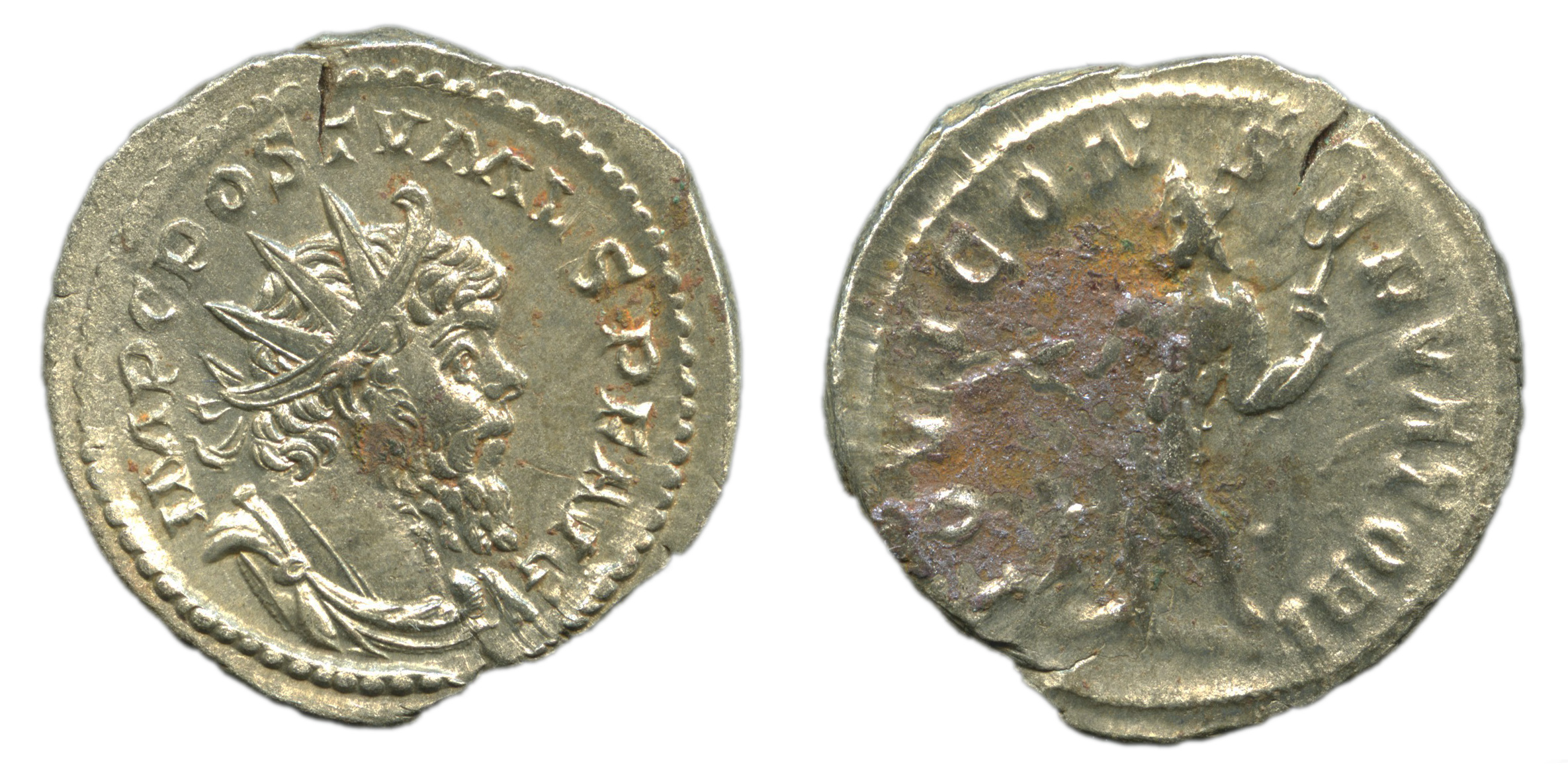
A silver Roman coin found in the Cunetio Hoard

The Cunetio site has been known since the 19th century, when local antiquarians conducted sporadic excavations. The full scale and importance of the site, however, was identified from aerial photos of crop marks taken in 1940, and the site has been sporadically excavated since the 1950s alongside the continuation of aerial photography to further map the site. In the 1960s, a small coin hoard was found, followed in 1978 by the much larger Cunetio Hoard of over 55,000 coins. The site was dug and geophysically surveyed in 2009 by Channel 4's archaeological television programme Time Team, which found many more coins and other objects.

The town grew around a mansio that had been built near the crossing of two Roman roads: the east–west road (Margary 53) from Speen in Berkshire to Aquae Sulis (Bath), and the south-east to north road (43) from Winchester to Wanborough. As the town grew, it developed a regular grid of streets and stone buildings on its eastern side but retained less regular and substantial structures in the west part. The settlement's original defences were earthworks and an outer ditch; in the 4th century AD, these were replaced by massive stone walls 4 m (13 ft) wide, a large western gateway, and 17 semi-octagonal, external wall-towers.

The masonry walls ran inside and parallel with the original defences on the east side but outside of them on the south and west sides. The stone towers were approximately every 36.7 m (120 ft) apart. Excavations of the west gate show it was flanked by two towers and possibly had a set of iron-gates similar to a portcullis, because grooves were found in the remains of the towers' footings.

Archaeological examinations of the site do not show why Cunetio deserved so much expenditure on improving its defences, an act that was a rare occurrence for inland Britannia at the time, when most Roman military engineering projects were focused on the Saxon Shore forts. Two theories have been suggested: first that the town was being converted into a Legionary fortress to re-establish Roman authority in this part of the province of Britannia. Second, that the improvement work was being orchestrated by an ambitious local British governor – the type of man who would, within a generation or so, be setting himself up as a war-lord or regional chieftain. Interpretation therefore swings between the Roman Empire re-establishing its authority after various rebellions and uprisings, or Roman authority breaking down.

In the 3rd century, the town was a prosperous settlement, and by the start of the 4th, it had become a centre of villas. It has also been suggested that the town was reorganised as a centre of taxation, administration, and military functions later in the 4th century AD, coinciding with the addition of the defensive stone wall. However, the Roman withdrawal from Britain c. 410 caused Cunetio to rapidly decline in importance, until it was completely abandoned.
