= Marlborough Benefice =

The Marlborough Anglican Team is a group of parishes in and around the town of Marlborough, Wiltshire, England. It consists of the parishes of St Mary within the town, St George Preshute (which also serves Manton) to the west, and St John the Baptist at Mildenhall (Minal) to the east. The benefice is part of the Marlborough deanery in the Diocese of Salisbury of the Church of England, which is part of the Anglican Communion.
