= Durocornovium =

Roman settlement in Wiltshire, England

Coordinates: 51.568°N 1.723°W

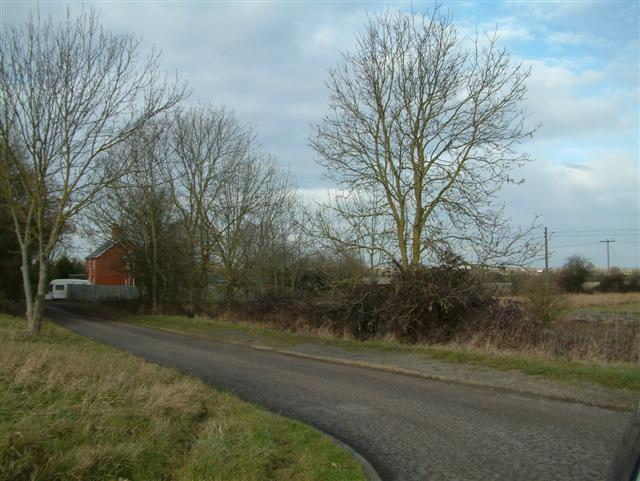
Approximate location of Durocornovium at Nythe Farm

Durocornovium was a Roman town in Britain, situated on the Roman road between Corinium Dobunnorum (Cirencester) and Calleva Atrebatum (Silchester). In many ways Durocornovium was a typical small Roman town.

== Site ==
The town, encompassing around 25 hectares at its peak, was located at Nythe Farm, east of the A419 adjacent to modern Swindon, although the site is usually associated with the village of Wanborough to the southeast. The farmland is a designated flood plain and has a history of inundation, alleviated by modern drainage, based on clay and gravel beds.

There is no public access and no remains are visible.

== Excavations ==
The following digs have been made at Durocornovium:

1692 – Workmen uncovered an earthen pot containing two thousand coins dated no later than the reign of Commodus

1862 – Sir R. C. Hoare made a visit to the site and found it had every mark of Roman residence, in coins, figured bricks, tiles, but unfortunately, had not preserved them.

1967 – Evidence of stone buildings uncovered.

1968 – A stone building found plus cobbled surfaces and post holes.

1969 – Six week dig that revealed earlier buildings.

1970 – Inconclusive dig in areas suffering from post-Roman disturbance.

1975 – Two trenches dug and material recovered.

1976 – The most extensive dig which allowed a chronology for the town to be created.

== Interpretation ==
Duro- is a Celtic word meaning "door" (cognate at the Proto-Indo-European level with English door and Latin forum) and, by extension, "enclosed market, square, forum, walled town, village".,

Cornovium may either be a common noun in Brittonic meaning "horn, peninsula", or derive from the British Cornovii people of the Midlands, based around Wroxeter; alternately, we may have or an identically named tribe from the area of Durocornovium. There is, however, a mention of a Cohors I Cornovium in Roman records and suggestions have been made that they were connected with the site, though no evidence exists.

A minor tributary of the Cole, which rises at Chiseldon and flows past Durocornovium, was known variously in late Saxon charters as Dorcyn, Dorcan, Dorternebrok, probably derived from a British form *Dorce; this stream may have given its name to the settlement.

== History and development ==
=== Pre-Roman habitation ===
The site shows evidence of Neolithic and Bronze Age farming With the Iron Age and the creation of hill forts in the area there's little evidence of habitation, and the only datable item is a coin of Eppillus who lived during the late 1st century BC to early 1st century AD. He was the son of Commius, king of the pro-Roman Atrebates tribe and is known to have controlled a mint at modern Silchester.

=== Phase 1 habitation (AD 50-80) ===
The original development is assumed to be military in nature and dates from the period when Roman legionaries built the road through the area, backed by the discovery of material dating from the reign of Nero. One building from this period has been identified, an apparently short-lived construction showing signs of iron working or blacksmithing, perhaps indicative of a mutatio (horse station).

The name suggests the presence of a legionary fort. The modern day name of the site reinforces the idea. Nythe is an anglicised version of nidum (nest) and a name applied to forts elsewhere, such as Neath in Wales. So far no evidence of this has come to light, though some ditches uncovered during excavation might possibly be those from a marching camp.

With the military emphasis moving north the site was abandoned for at least twenty years before Britons resettled the place as shown by the remains of roundhouses dated to that time.

=== Phase 2 habitation (AD 80-230) ===
Durocornovium was the site of intensive building. The discovery of lime kilns and lead working point to building trades in full swing. Clearly it was benefiting from its location on the road, backed by a further southward road to Cunetio and Venta Belgarum The southward route is not mentioned in the Antonine Itinerary so may not have been considered as anything but a minor road by the Romans themselves.

Perhaps more relevant was the political significance. Durocornovium rested on a junction of roads linking regional administration centres at Calleva Atrebatum, Corinium Dobunnorum, and Venta Belgarum. As the names suggest, these towns were designated as civitas and used as governmental bases for control over the local British tribes. This centralised system might not have been sufficient for the control of a potentially rebellious populace and it's believed that some administration was spread to outlying towns which would have included Durocornovium.

Stone buildings dominate this period and some evidence of monumental columns were found during roadworks. A mansio (a sort of hotel for travelling officials) has been identified 110 metres from the road, a substantial structure that so far remains unexcavated. Other remains include a possible granary.

Recent finds at Groundwell have pointed to the affluence of the area during the height of the Roman Empire. The discovery of a Nymphaeum, a shrine at a well-head, agrees with another Roman structure at a spring south of Durocornovium at Callas Hill. Swindon hill was inhabited largely for the availability of spring water and typically this was something the Romans recognised in their religious life, raising the possibility of a major temple site either destroyed or undiscovered. Remnants of monumental stonework were removed during bridge building which has raised speculation that the temple site is currently beneath a bridge pier. There is no evidence of any aqueduct, but given the close proximity of Dorcan Stream and the River Cole, it was unlikely that one was needed.

=== Phase 3 habitation (AD 230-400+) ===
Redevelopment is the main feature of this period. It appears the Roman roads were diverted slightly and some newer buildings were built on top of the old disused road surface.

Although many Roman towns in the later empire built stone defences (such as walls and a gatehouse identified at Cunetio, near Marlborough ten miles to the south) this defensive work did not occur at Durocornovium. It may be this was impossible on the marshy ground existing at the time, or simply that it was economically not viable, and it is notable that the hill fort at Liddington immediately to the south was re-occupied in the 3rd century. It was not for shortage of stone: the Romans quarried stone on Swindon hill and although there is no evidence that stone was used at Durocornovium, it remains highly likely as a local resource that it was.

There was a unique development at Durocornovium in the 4th century. Whilst it is possible that conventional stone buildings continued to be used, there was a proliferation of wooden buildings built on top of sarsen stone pilings to stay above ground level, a feature that explains the relative bounty of coins dating from that time as coins were dropped and lost through the floorboards. Such a change in architecture reflects what archaeologists believe was an increase in local flooding. It might also reflect changes in the economy and the availability of skilled trades.

=== Post-Roman habitation ===
After the removal of Roman legions from Britain at the beginning of the 5th century the civil administration collapsed within fifty years. With no economy to support the town, it was quickly abandoned.

Saxon settlers used Durocornovium as a source of building material when they settled on Swindon Hill. Such removal of stone and damage from ploughing since the Dark Ages has effectively destroyed much of the evidence. The road through the site remained in use and a coin dating from the reign of Henry III was found embedded in the cobbled surface. Modern roads still follow the general course of those built by the Romans.

== Industry and commerce ==
This was a town on a major communication link and for that reason a busy commercial element is probable. At Roman agricultural sites in the area, particularly to the south, the existence of ovens for drying corn indicates a trade in grain. The Romans also quarried stone from the hill to the west.

In what is now West Swindon, the Romans maintained a considerable pottery industry. The town has shown evidence of pottery remains from all over southern Britain, and some from Gaul and Africa, yet the potters of Durocornovium created a unique style of painted wares which never became fashionable nor widespread.
