= Hannah Twynnoy =

First person killed in Britain by a tiger (c. 1669/70 – 1703)

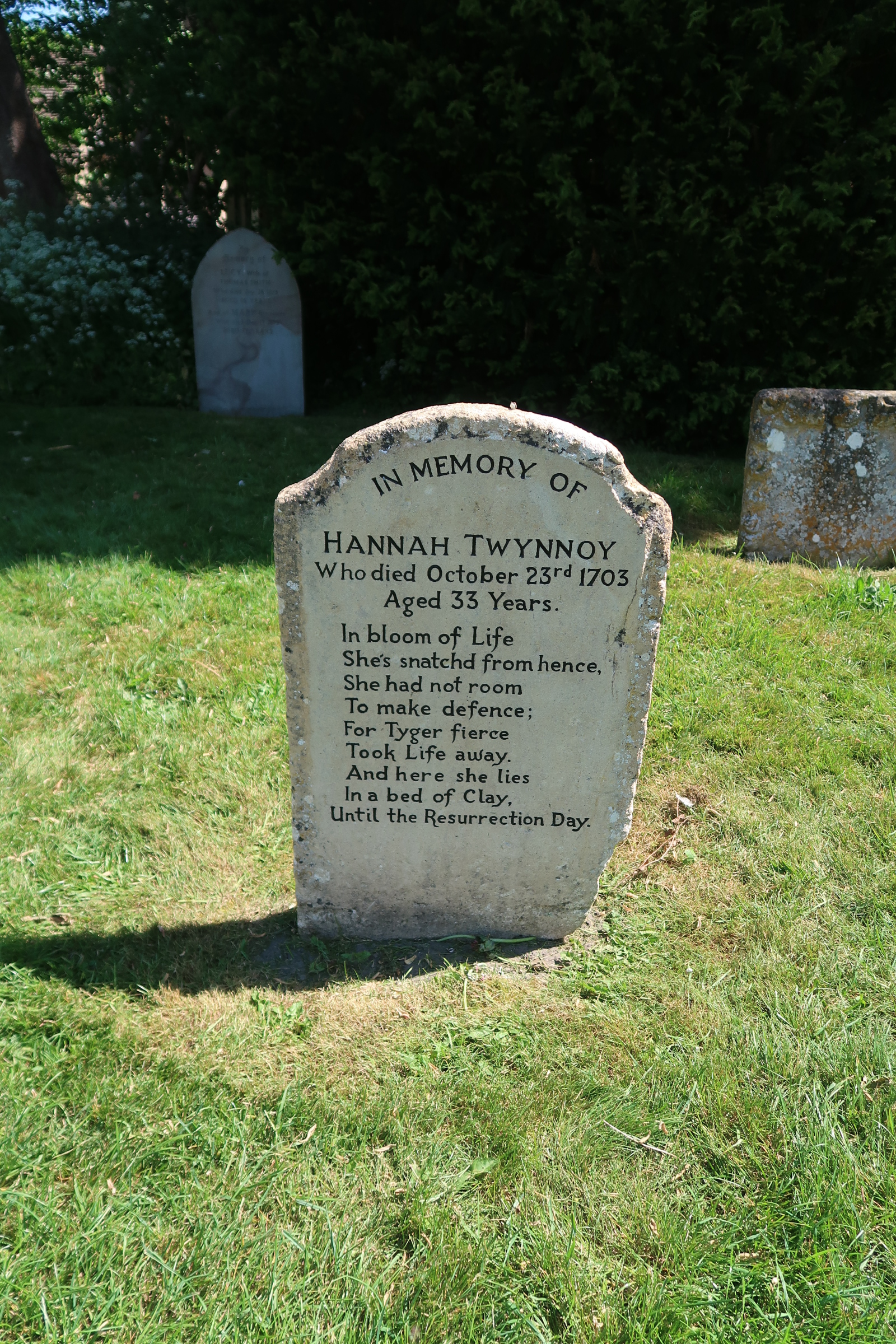
Twynnoy's gravestone, at Malmesbury Abbey, Wiltshire, has been restored and is a popular photography subject

Hannah Twynnoy (c. 1669/70 – October 1703) is believed to have been the first person to have been killed by a tiger in England. Twynnoy was an early 18th-century barmaid working in The White Lion public house in the centre of the English market town of Malmesbury in Wiltshire.

Her death is recorded in the Malmesbury parish register, which records a burial on 23 October 1703 of "Hannah Twynney kild by a Tygre at ye White Lyon". Her gravestone survives in a corner of the churchyard of Malmesbury Abbey, with a memorial poem alluding to her death. A memorial plaque with more details was recorded by an antiquarian in the nearby village church at Hullavington, but is now lost.

== Gravestone ==
Her gravestone records her name and death at the age of 33 on 23 October 1703, with a relatively long, evocative poem which reads:

In bloom of Life
She's snatchd from hence,
She had not room
To make defence;
For Tyger fierce
Took Life away.
And here she lies
In a bed of Clay,

Until the Resurrection Day.

== Plaque recorded in a local history ==
To the memory of Hannah Twynnoy. She was a servant of the White Lion Inn where there was an exhibition of wild beasts, and amongst the rest a very fierce tiger which she imprudently took pleasure in teasing, not withstanding the repeated remonstrance of its keeper. One day whilst amusing herself with this dangerous diversion the enraged animal by an extraordinary effort drew out the staple, sprang towards the unhappy girl, caught hold of her gown and tore her to pieces.

— Recorded by the Athelstan Museum

Historian John Bowen has found a local history with a more detailed account of the death as, it states, placed on a plaque on the wall of the parish church in Hullavington, a village 5 miles (8 km) from Malmesbury. The plaque (see box for wording) that appeared to have been installed soon after her death, in the first years of the 18th century, was recorded in the Victorian period by a local historian and may since have been sold, melted down or stolen.

== Oral history ==
The common thread of such stories by word of mouth from generation to generation, matches exactly the plaque, almost always with less formal wording, stating that Hannah Twynnoy was a barmaid working at a pub called the White Lion in Malmesbury (8 Gloucester Street, later converted to a private house) in 1703 when a menagerie arrived to set up in the pub's large rear yard. Among the animals there was included a tiger, which Hannah was warned against upsetting. She liked bothering the animal until one day it got tired of it and mauled her. Hannah did not survive.

== Unsolved aspects of the death ==
=== Wealth or pity? ===
Poetic epitaphs on gravestones were popular at the turn of the 18th century, but generally only for the wealthy and celebrated. A gravestone and a plot in the churchyard of Malmesbury Abbey for any woman, who could not have been a priest or a priest's wife, would have been costly, even without engaging the services of a poet. The identity of the patron who paid for her tombstone and plot remains a mystery, although they may have been donated by the church and vestry.

=== Family ===
Her connection with the village of Hullavington, which kept family records at this time, seems anomalous. Her sole connection comes from a later local historian giving the wording and location of a plaque.

Other than her burial, the parish registers and bishop's transcripts for Malmesbury contain no entry, between 1635 and 1700, for anyone named Twynnoy.

== Enduring legacy ==
In 1993 a new residential road in Malmesbury was named 'Twynnoy Close'.

In 2003, on the 300th anniversary of the death, a ceremony was carried out at the grave when every schoolgirl in the town, younger than 11 and named Hannah, placed a flower on the grave.

Twynnoy was featured in the 'Stupid Deaths' segment of the CBBC programme Horrible Histories (Series 4, Episode 6).
