= Tobias Young =

British painter

John Tobias Young (died 1824) was a British painter.

== Life ==
Young was probably born in Mildenhall near Marlborough. He exhibited at the Royal Academy in 1816 and 1817, and painted the scenery for Lord Barrymore's private theatre at Wargrave. He practised for some time at Southampton, to which town and its neighbourhood his reputation was chiefly confined. In the Southampton Town Hall there is a Judgment of Solomon by him.

He lived at 1 Hanover Buildings, Southampton until his death on 1 December 1824.

The Southampton City Museums collection includes some topographical paintings by Young of the area around the city.
