= Preshute =

- Civil parish
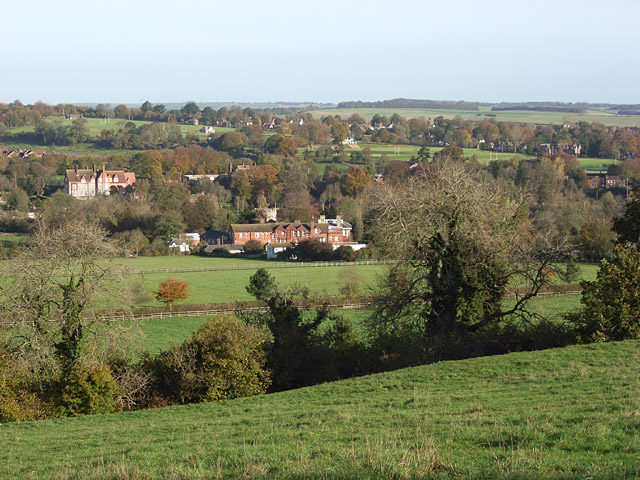
- Above Preshute
- Interactive map of Preshute
- Coordinates: 51.433°N 1.769°W
- Country: England
- County: Wiltshire
- Unitary authority: Wiltshire

Population (2011)
  - Total: 193
- Website: preshutepc.org.uk

Preshute (/ˈprɛʃuːt/) is a civil parish immediately west and northwest of Marlborough in Wiltshire, England. Unusually for a Wiltshire parish, it does not take its name from any town or village. The population at the 2011 census was 193.

The River Kennet and the A4 road cross the parish; the boundary between Marlborough and Preshute is beyond Manton, about 1.3 miles (2.1 km) along the A4 from the centre of Marlborough.

The parish is almost entirely downland and farmland. The settlements are Manton House (with Manton Stables, where racehorses are trained) and the hamlet of Clatford.

== Etymology ==
The name Preshute is first attested in 1185, in the form Prestcheta, 1249, as Presteshethe, and 1252, as Preschut. Its first element is thought to be the Old English word prēost ("priest"), but its second element is less clear. It could be the Old English word ciete ("cottage"), in which case the name once meant "priest's cottage", or it could be the Common Brittonic word that survives in modern Welsh as coed ("woodland"), in which case it meant "priest's woodland".

== History ==
In the 12th or 13th century the boundary between Preshute and Marlborough was immediately west of Marlborough Castle, and the parish included the settlements of Manton and Clatford.

On 9 November 1901 the parish was abolished and split to form "Preshute Within" and "Preshute Without"; parts also went to North Savernake and Mildenhall. On 1 October 1925 Preshute Without was renamed "Preshute", and the area of Preshute Within – including Preshute church – was transferred to Marlborough parish. In 1934 the Marlborough boundary was moved further west to include Manton.

== Church ==
The Anglican Church of St George is at grid reference SU 179 685 about 0.6 miles (0.97 km) west of the centre of Marlborough, beyond Marlborough College and just south of the Kennet. It has a 15th-century tower and was restored in 1854 by T.H. Wyatt; it is Grade II* listed and forms part of the Marlborough Benefice.

This area was identified as Preshute as recently as the 1961 (7th series) Ordnance Survey map but on current maps and road signs it is part of Manton.

== School ==
Preshute Primary School is in Manton, outside the parish.

== See also ==
- Marlborough White Horse
