= Marlborough Town Hall =

Municipal building in Marlborough, Wiltshire, England

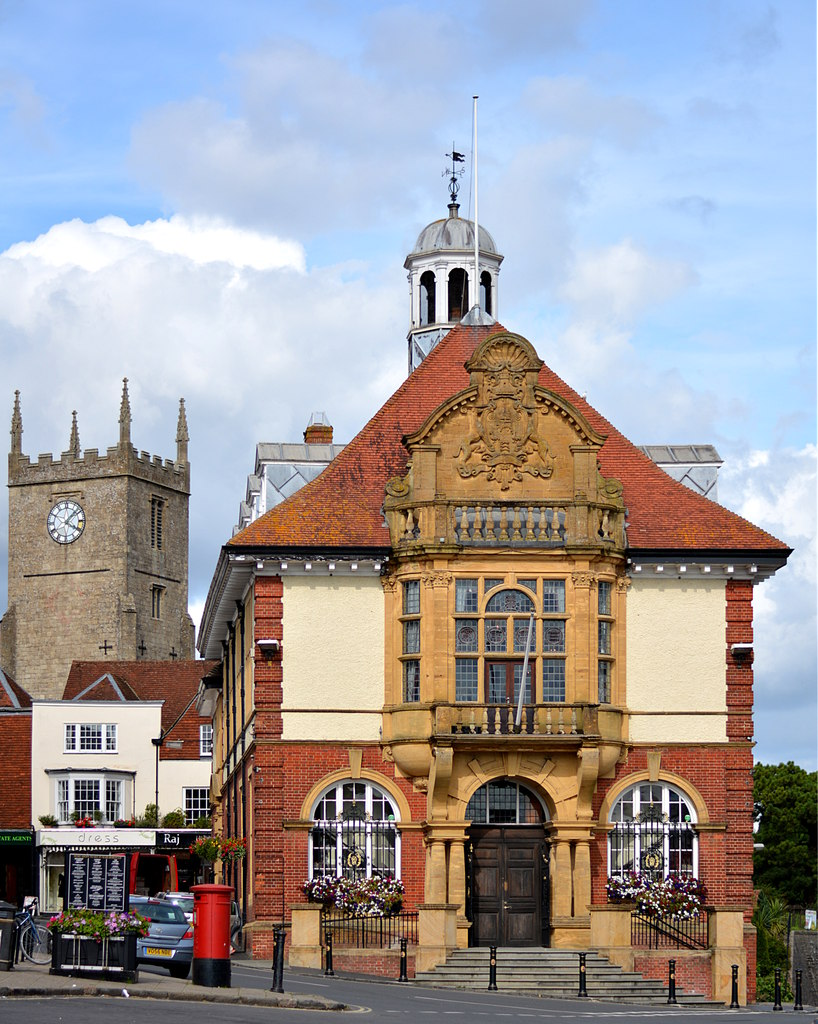
- Marlborough Town Hall

- Shown in Wiltshire
- 51.4214°N 1.7299°W
- Location: High Street, Marlborough

History
- Built: 1902

Site notes
- Architect: Charles Ponting
- Architectural style: Renaissance style

Listed Building – Grade II
- Official name: The Town Hall
- Designated: 21 October 1974
- Reference no.: 1242852

Marlborough Town Hall is a municipal building in the High Street in Marlborough, Wiltshire, England. The structure, which is the meeting place of Marlborough Town Council, is a Grade II listed building.

== History ==
The first town hall in Marlborough was a medieval structure which was rebuilt in 1654, remodelled to a design by John Hammond at a cost of £1,025 in 1793, and altered to facilitate hearings of the county court in 1867. It was constructed on pillars, so that markets could be held on the open ground floor, with an assembly hall on the first floor. It was in this building that, in 1877, the member of parliament and future Prime Minister, William Ewart Gladstone, gave a speech exhorting the government to remove all obstacles preventing unemployed people from securing work. It was also used as a venue for public events including boxing and wrestling. However, by the late 19th century it had become dilapidated and, with only one wooden staircase, it was considered dangerous and was demolished in 1900.

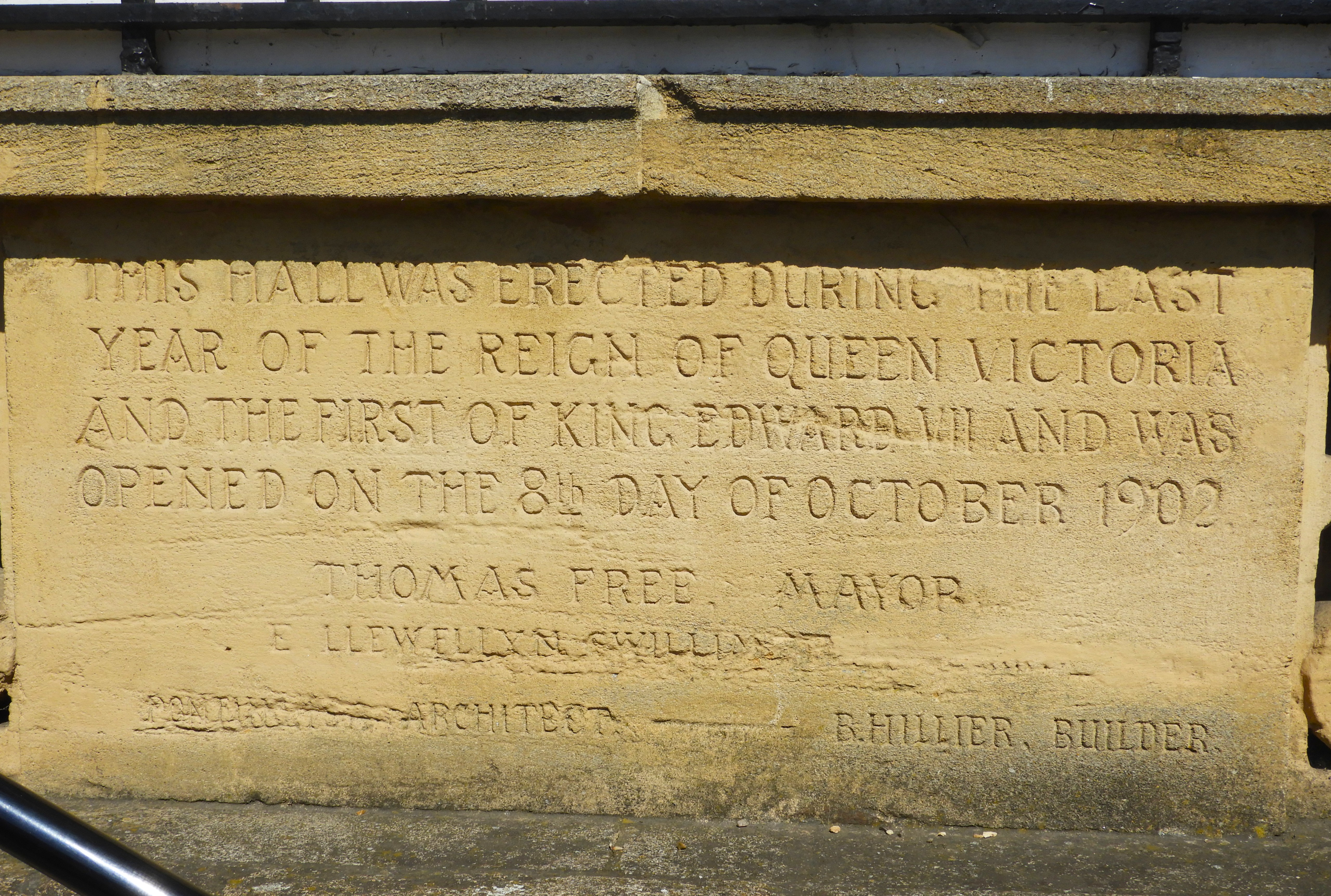
Stone commemorating the opening of Marlborough Town Hall

The current building was designed by Charles Ponting in the Renaissance style, built by R. Hillier in red brick with hamstone dressings at a cost of £11,000 and was officially opened by the mayor, Thomas Free, on 8 October 1902. The design involved a symmetrical main frontage with three bays facing southwest down the High Street. The central bay featured a short flight of steps leading up to a recessed round-headed doorway flanked by pedestals, paired Doric order columns and large brackets supporting a stone balustraded balcony; there was a prominent stained glass bay window on the first floor and a segmental pediment above with a coat of arms in the tympanum. The outer bays were fenestrated by round-headed windows with architraves and keystones. Internally, the principal rooms were the main assembly room on the first floor, the council chamber, which became the meeting place of Marlborough Borough Council, and the court room, which became the venue for the local quarter session hearings. The Marquess of Ailesbury presented a fine chair for the use of the mayor while presiding in the council chamber.

The Nobel-prize winner, William Golding, recounted in one of his essays how his mother, Mildred, accompanied by his father, Alex, campaigned for women's suffrage on the steps of the town hall in the years just before the First World War.

In December 1939, the senior officers of the 42nd (East Lancashire) Infantry Division and, in a separate session, the senior officers from 48th (South Midland) Division were personally briefed by the Chief of the General Staff, General Sir Edmund Ironside, in the assembly room before being deployed to France as part of the British Expeditionary Force. In July 1944, two parties were held in the town hall, one for officers and one for other-ranks, to celebrate the return to billets in Wiltshire of the 3rd Battalion of the US 506th Infantry Regiment after taking part in Operation Overlord.

Although the borough surveyor and other council officers were initially also based at the town hall, with increasing responsibilities, they were relocated to larger offices at No. 1, The Green in Marlborough. The town hall continued to serve as the meeting place of the borough council until the enlarged Kennet District Council was formed in 1974. After that, it became the meeting place of Marlborough Town Council. Following the completion of an extensive programme of refurbishment works in 2004, the building re-emerged as a significant public events venue in the town: recent performers have included the singer, Steve Knightley, in February 2022 and the band, Megson, in April 2022.
