= Hullavington =

Village in Wiltshire, England

Coordinates: 51.536°N 2.154°W

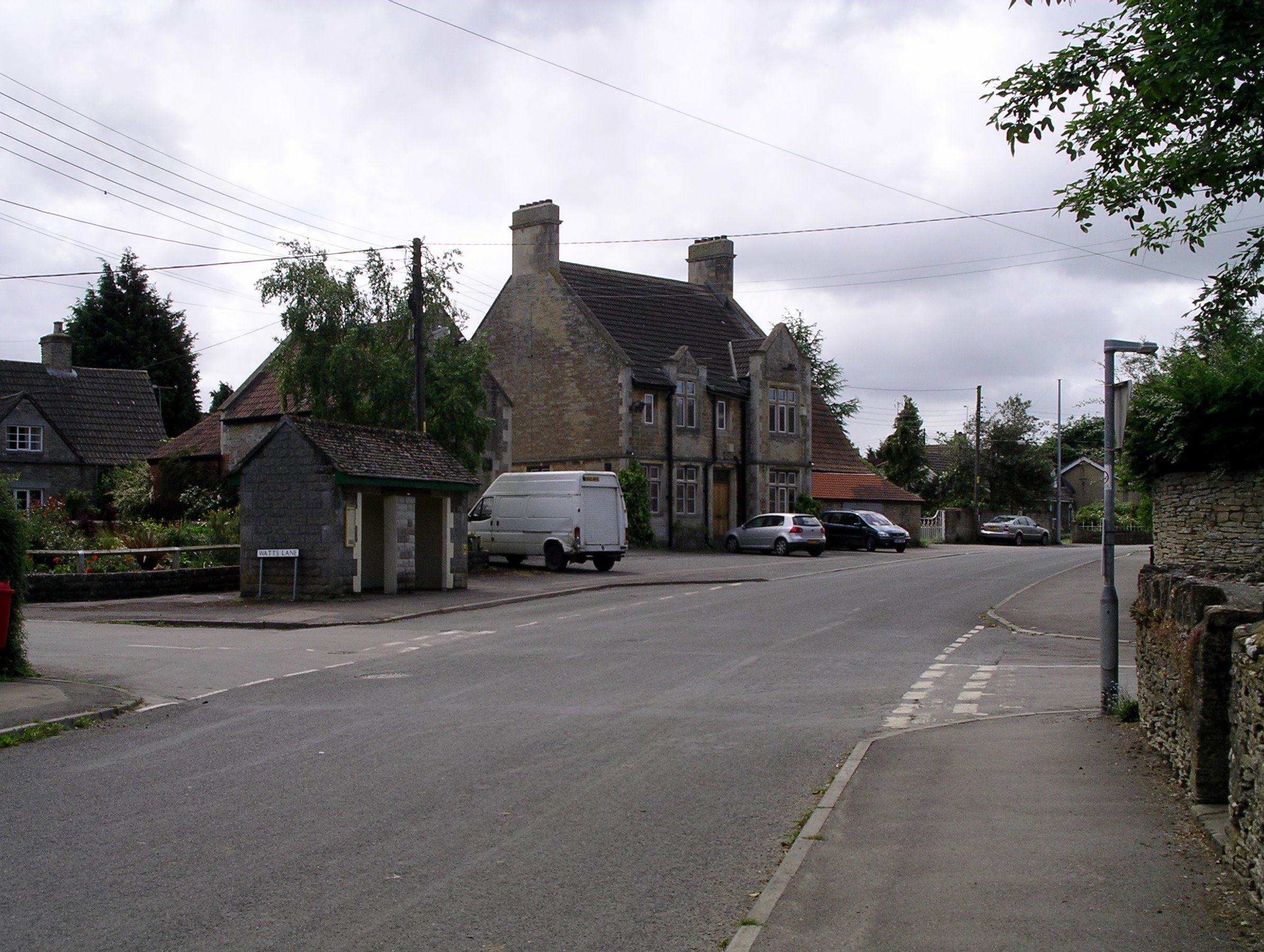
- The Street, Hullavington

- Location within Wiltshire
- Population: 1,223 (in 2011)
- OS grid reference: ST894820
- Civil parish: Hullavington
- Unitary authority: Wiltshire
- Ceremonial county: Wiltshire
- Region: South West
- Country: England
- Sovereign state: United Kingdom
- Post town: Chippenham
- Postcode district: SN14
- Dialling code: 01666
- Police: Wiltshire
- Fire: Dorset and Wiltshire
- Ambulance: South Western
- UK Parliament: South Cotswolds
- Website: Parish Council

Hullavington is a village and civil parish in Wiltshire, England, just to the north of the M4 motorway. The village lies about 4 miles (6 km) southwest of Malmesbury and 5 1/2 miles (9 km) north of Chippenham.

The Fosse Way, a Roman road, forms the western boundary of the parish. The Gauze Brook, a tributary of the Bristol Avon, crosses the parish from southwest to northeast.

== History ==
A settlement of 35 households at Hunlavintone was recorded in the Domesday Book of 1086, and at that time the land was held by Ralf de Mortimer. The place-name means 'the town of Hunlaf's people'. The spelling Hunlavyngton is recorded in 1418.

Hullavington church and manor belonged to the abbey of Saint-Victor-en-Caux (Saint-Victor-l'Abbaye, Seine-Maritime) in the early Middle Ages. The establishment also had Clatford manor, some 18 miles (29 km) to the southeast, and was known as Clatford Priory or Hullavington Priory. In 1443 its land was given to Eton College, who retained it until 1958.

The monastic house was presumably northwest of the church; Court House was built on that site in the 16th century, with alterations and extension in the 17th and later centuries.

Bradfield (north of Hullavington village) and Surrendell (in the west of the modern parish) were recorded in the Domesday Book and became medieval hamlets, then declined to single farmsteads. Bradfield had 21 poll-tax payers in 1377 but by the later 15th century there were no buildings beyond the manor house and its farm. Bradfield Manor Farmhouse, now Grade I listed, is described by Nikolaus Pevsner as a "rare survival of a C15 hall".

Surrendell had a church in 1249, and 37 poll-tax payers in 1377. A manor house was built in the 16th century and Surrendell farmhouse was begun c. 1620-40. The church was in ruins in the late 17th century and the manor house was demolished c. 1871. A pillow mound rabbit warren, some 36 metres in length, survives near Surrendell Farm.

Schooling began in a small way in the village in 1690. Two small schools, which became National Schools, were built in 1832 and 1833; the larger of them, on the east side of The Street, was enlarged in 1873 and became the sole school in 1879. A new school was built on the northern edge of the village in 1970. In 1903 the Great Western Railway opened the South Wales Main Line which passes to the north of Hullavington village, and had a station on the road towards Norton. The station closed to passengers in 1961 and to goods traffic in 1965; the line remains in use but there are no longer any local stations on this stretch between Swindon and Bristol Parkway.

The parish population at the beginning of the nineteenth century was 395 (1801 census), rising to 823 in 1901 and was 1,223 in 2011.

== Parish church ==
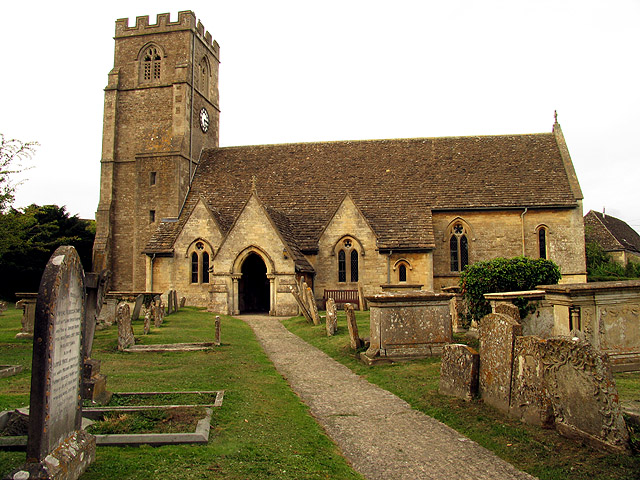
St Mary's Church, Hullavington

The Church of England parish church of St Mary was begun in the 12th century. The three-bay north arcade is from the late 12th century while the south arcade and northeast Bradfield chapel are from the 13th century. The timber roof of the north aisle is 15th century, and there are pew ends from the same period. Restoration took place in the early 1870s and the tower was rebuilt in 1880, both to designs of A.W. Blomfield or his nephew Reginald Blomfield.

At one time the church had a plaque commemorating the death at Malmesbury in 1703 of Hannah Twynnoy, believed to be the first person in Britain to have been killed by a tiger. Her gravestone with its inscribed epitaph can still be seen at Malmesbury Abbey.

The church was designated as Grade I listed in 1959. The parish is now one of eight served by the Gauzebrook group ministry.

== Local government ==
Hullavington is a civil parish with an elected parish council. It is in the area of Wiltshire Council, a unitary authority, which is responsible for most local government functions.

== Amenities ==
Hullavington has a garage, a shop, a pub and two churches, one of which meets in the village hall. The village school continues as Hullavington CofE Primary School, where pupils include those from families posted to Buckley Barracks. There are three Girlguiding units in Hullavington: Brownies, Rainbows and a Guide unit which opened in September 2007.

== Military connections ==
Hullavington Airfield, formerly RAF Hullavington, is next to the village. Most of the airfield is in the neighbouring parish of Stanton St Quintin, along with the associated barracks which were renamed Buckley Barracks in 2003.

== Notable residents ==
Jazz vocalist and pianist Jamie Cullum was brought up in Hullavington. The former MP Neil Hamilton and his wife Christine moved to Hullavington in October 2004.
