= St Mary's Church, Marlborough =

St Mary's, Marlborough
- Church of St Mary the Virgin
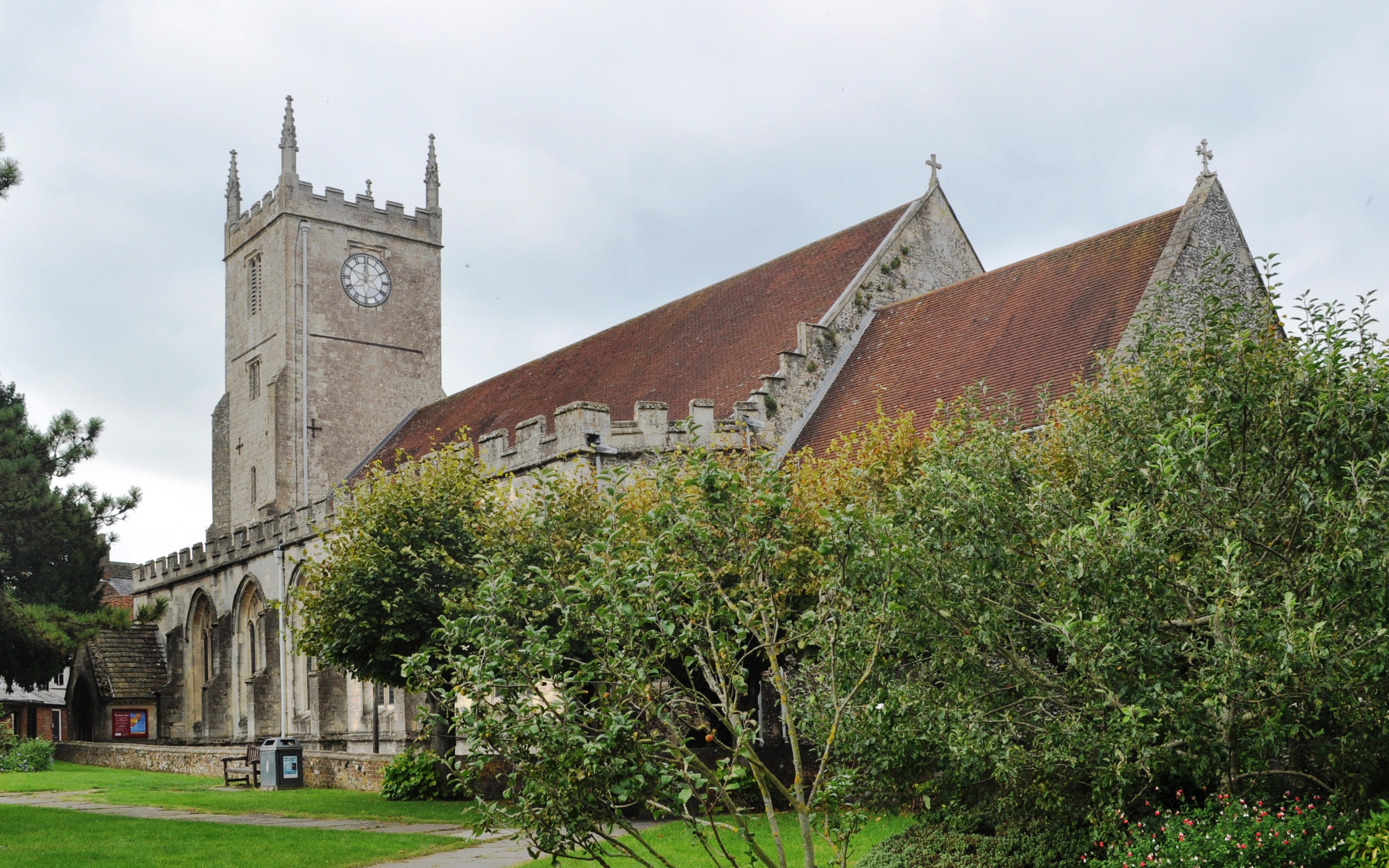

- Location in Wiltshire
- 51.4218°N 1.7295°W
- OS grid reference: SU 18919 69244
- Location: Marlborough, Wiltshire
- Country: England
- Denomination: Anglican

History
- Status: Parish church

Architecture
- Functional status: Active
- Style: Perpendicular
- Years built: 12th, 15th–17th centuries, 1874

Administration
- Province: Canterbury
- Diocese: Salisbury
- Archdeaconry: Wilts
- Deanery: Marlborough
- Parish: St. Mary the Virgin with St. Peter and St. Paul

Listed Building – Grade I
- Reference no.: 1034302

St Mary's Church is the Church of England parish church in the town of Marlborough, Wiltshire, England.

The church stands at the east end of the town's High Street. Founded in the 12th century, it was partly rebuilt after a fire of 1653, and extended in 1874. It is a Grade I listed building.

== History ==
Two churches were mentioned at Marlborough in 1091, and in 1223 the bishop of Salisbury took both St Mary's and St Peter's under his jurisdiction. St Mary's was the church for the eastern part of the borough, while St Peter's, at the other end of the High Street, served the western part.

== Building ==
The present church is built of ashlar and rubble, with ashlar dressings; the tower is ashlar. In the west wall of a tower is a repositioned 12th-century doorway or arch, and inside the church are fragments of 11th-century stonework including parts of corbels. The tower was added in the 15th century, and in that century and the early 16th the aisles were rebuilt and extended.

The town suffered a large fire in 1653 which destroyed the roof and the interior of the church, and damaged the Norman arcades. Subsequently the north arcade was merged with the nave – a Norman respond survives at the west end – and the south arcade was rebuilt as five rounded arches, described by Pevsner as "eminently interesting". Galleries were added to the nave in 1707 and the chancel was rebuilt in 1873-4 to designs by G.E. Street. The south chapel was restored as a memorial after the First World War. Further restoration was undertaken in 1955–7.

Of the eight bells in the tower, one is from 1653 and two are from the 18th century. The seventh and eighth bells were cast in 1969 from the discarded peal of St Peter's church. The building was designated as Grade I listed in 1949.

== Parish ==
The benefices of the two Marlborough parishes were united in 1924, and the parishes were united in 1952 to form the parish of Saint Mary the Virgin with Saint Peter and Saint Paul. St Peter's church was declared redundant in 1974 and later became a community centre and events venue.

Today the parish is served by the Marlborough Anglican Team, which also covers St George's, Manton (to the west of Marlborough) and St John the Baptist, Mildenhall (east).
