= Clatford Priory =

Monastery in Wiltshire, England

Clatford Priory, also called Hullavington Priory, was a priory in Wiltshire, England.

The churches at Hullavington and Surrendell, both southwest of Malmesbury, were granted to the Benedictine abbey of Saint-Victor-en-Caux (Saint-Victor-l'Abbaye, Seine-Maritime) in the late 11th or early 12th century, and the establishment later gained the manors of Hullavington and Clatford, west of Marlborough. Priors are intermittently recorded from 1261 until about 1390. In 1441 the priory's land was given to Eton College.
