= Cunetio Hoard =

Hoard of Roman coins found in Wiltshire, UK

Coordinates: 51.422°N 1.694°W

The Cunetio Hoard, also known as the Mildenhall Hoard, is the largest hoard of Roman coins found in Britain. It was discovered in 1978 at the site of the Roman town of Cunetio, near modern-day Mildenhall, Wiltshire, and consisted of 54,951 low value coins. The coins were contained in a large pot and a lead container. The coins are now in the British Museum and the pot is on display at the Wiltshire Museum in Devizes.

== Overview ==
Cunetio developed from a small settlement into an important economic market for the area, which is thought to explain the concentration of coins. Excavation of a nearby well in 1912 uncovered 102 coins, possibly from another hoard. A smaller hoard had been found at this site in 1960.

The 1978 hoard consisted of 54,951 coins weighing over 180 kilograms (390 lb). Most of the coins were low value Radiates, however there were significant numbers of Antoniniani, some of which dated from the reign of Gallienus (253–268). The dates of the coins were between AD 250–275, however the majority are from the independent empire established in Gaul by Postumus in 260. Larger hoards of Roman coins have been found at Misrata in Libya and are believed to have been found at Evreux in France (100,000 coins) and Komin, Croatia (300,000 coins); however, at the time of its discovery the Cunetio Hoard was by far the largest in Britain.

The site of the hoard and the wider settlement were surveyed and excavated for the Channel 4 television programme Time Team in 2009.

== See also ==
- List of hoards in Britain

== Sources ==
- Abdy, Richard Anthony (2002), Romano-British coin hoards, Shire archaeology, No. 82, Princes Risborough: Shire, ISBN 978-0-7478-0532-8.
- Besly, Edward; Bland, Roger (1983). The Cunetio Treasure: Roman Coinage of the Third Century AD. London: British Museum Publications. ISBN 0-7141-0857-X.
