= Mildenhall, Wiltshire =

Village in Wiltshire, England

Coordinates: 51.425°N 1.700°W

Mildenhall
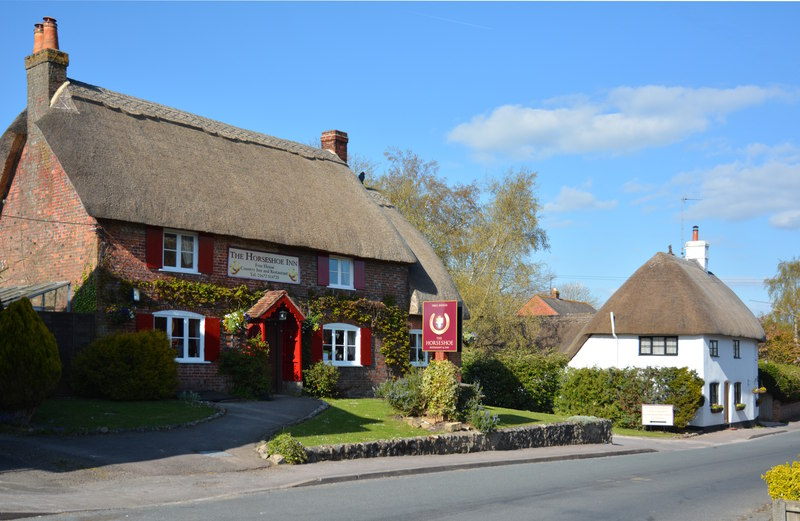
- The Horseshoe Inn, Mildenhall, 2014

- Location within Wiltshire
- Population: 477 (2011 census)
- OS grid reference: SU210696
- Civil parish: Mildenhall
- Unitary authority: Wiltshire
- Ceremonial county: Wiltshire
- Region: South West
- Country: England
- Sovereign state: United Kingdom
- Post town: Marlborough
- Postcode district: SN8
- Dialling code: 01672
- Police: Wiltshire
- Fire: Dorset and Wiltshire
- Ambulance: South Western
- UK Parliament: East Wiltshire
- Website: Parish Council

Mildenhall (/ˈmaɪnəl/ MY-nəl) is a village and civil parish in the Kennet Valley in Wiltshire, England, immediately east of the market town of Marlborough. The village is about 1.5 miles (2 km) east of the centre of Marlborough, on the minor road which follows the River Kennet towards Ramsbury. The parish also contains the hamlets of Poulton and Stitchcombe. The name has often been written as Minal, and this is continued in the present-day pronunciation.

== History ==
The toponym is derived from the Old English but the site has been occupied since the Roman occupation of Britain, when the town of Cunetio (later a fortress) stood at an important road junction, on the opposite side of the river from the later village. No remains of this town are now standing, but they are clearly visible on aerial photographs. The Cunetio Hoard of Roman coins was discovered here in 1978. The name of the River Kennet, which runs through Mildenhall, is thought to have been derived from the Roman name, which is also used on the village's coat-of-arms.

Cunetio was deserted as a Romano-British site in about AD 450, but the site was reoccupied in the Anglo-Saxon era and a West Saxon charter drawn up between 803 and 805 refers to this settlement in its first recognisably modern form as Mildanhald, meaning "a nook of land of a woman called Milde or a man called Milda". The village is recorded in Domesday Book in 1086 as Mildenhalle, a settlement of 20 households on land held by Glastonbury Abbey. The name has since undergone numerous subtle changes in spelling and pronunciation.

Part of the west boundary of the parish follows the River Og, until it meets the Kennet. The ancient parish had three tithings, namely Mildenhall, Poulton (west, now on the edge of Marlborough) and Stitchcombe (south of the Kennet). The area was part of Savernake Forest from at least the 13th century.

Poulton House, dated 1706, is described by Pevsner as "the most perfect house in Marlborough".

In 1881 the Swindon, Marlborough and Andover Railway company built their Swindon-Marlborough line through the Og valley in the southwest of the parish. The line closed in 1961 and the track was removed.

== Parish church ==
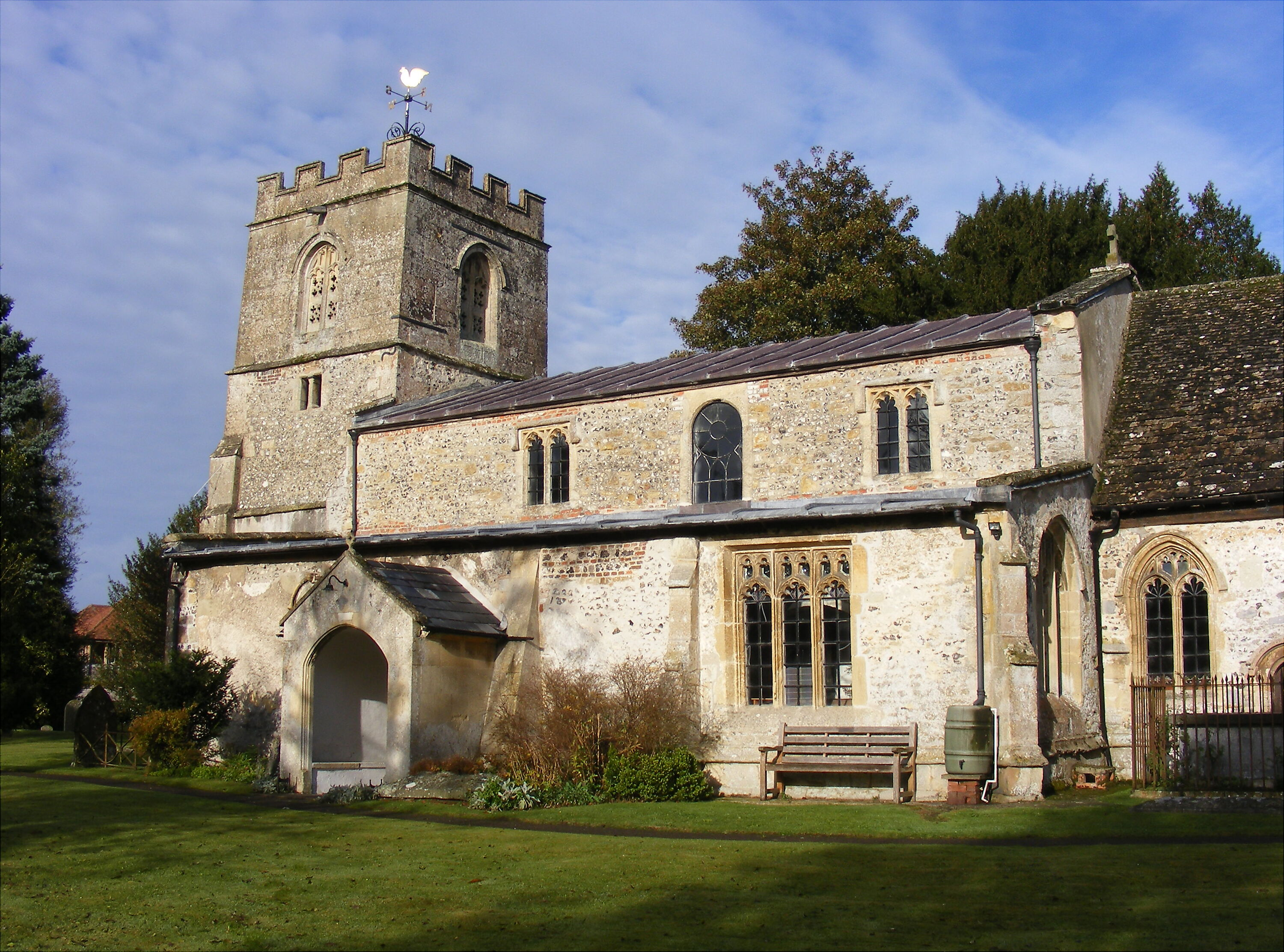
Church of St John the Baptist

Nikolaus Pevsner describes the parish church of St John the Baptist as "a perfect example of a small village church of many periods, and, together with its Late Georgian furnishings, preserved completely".

Land at Mildenhall was granted to Glastonbury Abbey in the 8th century, and a church may have been built in the early 9th century. The base of the tower of the present church is from the 9th or 10th century, and the rest is the result of stages of rebuilding in the late 12th century and early 13th. In the 15th century the third stage of the tower and the clerestory were added, and most of the windows renewed. The plaster ceiling of the chancel is early 17th century, and the earlier nave roof was embellished at the same time. In the 18th or 19th centuries the south aisle was partly rebuilt and the south porch added. In 1816 a round-headed window was added to the south side of the clerestory, and another over the west door.

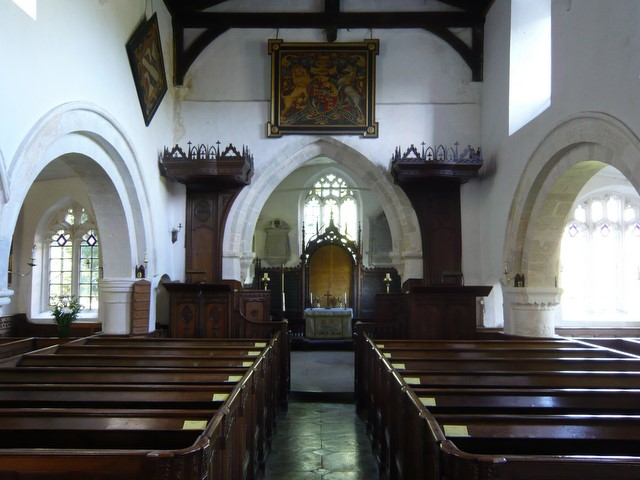
St John's, interior

The church is notable for its oak fittings, installed in 1814–1816 and called "outstanding" by Historic England. Julian Orbach, updating Pevsner's work, writes "in Gothick style, the very model of Late Georgian arrangements ... Unusually for rural England everything matches and is to a very high standard". Components include box pews, children's benches, twin pulpits (one a reading desk) with tall backs and decorated testers, and the stone font with wooden cover; and in the chancel, ornate pews, panelling and the reredos with its painted texts. Other work included stone flooring in black and white, and new oak doors. The west gallery, with curved panelled front to accommodate the organ, was completed in 1821. The refitting cost altogether around £2,000 and was instigated by Charles Francis (rector from 1788 until his death in 1821, also rural dean) and paid for by himself and twelve local property-owners, named on six shields displayed in the church.

In the heads of the chancel windows are fragments of 15th-century stained glass. The north-west window depicting the Raising of Lazarus, 1882, is by Mayer & Co. of Munich. There are six bells, five of them cast in 1801 after melting down the four that had been installed in 1596. The church has several marble memorials, including two by Joseph Harris of Bath for Thomas Baskerville (1818) and Rev. Charles Francis (1821). In 1966 the church was designated as Grade I listed.

Sir John Betjeman refers to St. John's as "a church of a Jane Austen novel". Simon Jenkins includes it in his England's Thousand Best Churches.

St. John's parish is now a member of the Marlborough team ministry, alongside St Mary's at Marlborough and St George's, Preshute.

== Notable buildings ==
Across the lane to the west of the churchyard are the 18th-century boundary brick wall, gate piers (with cornice and ball) and wrought iron gates of the former rectory. A large new rectory was built in 1862, in brick in a classical style, set back from the Marlborough road about a quarter of a mile west of the village; this house in turn was sold in 1965.

At Poulton, further along the Marlborough road, Poulton House stands in grounds by the River Og; 20th-century expansion has brought the town almost to the opposite bank. Orbach describes the Grade II* listed house – dated 1706 and extended in the 19th century – as a perfect example of Queen Anne style.

== Amenities ==
The village has a public house, the Horseshoe Inn. Until the early 21st century Mildenhall had a post office and village shop. The village hall was built in 1988.

Mildenhall usually holds a village fête, typically in mid-September on the village playing field, as well as a Guy Fawkes Bonfire Night and a Duck Race using plastic ducks. Mildenhall publishes a monthly newsletter called The Parish Pump, a joint publication with the neighbouring village of Axford.

There was a school, the Protestant Free School, in the village from 1824 to 1969. Designed in the shape of a cross by Robert Abraham, the former school is now a house.

The Rabley Drawing Centre a short way outside the village includes a contemporary art gallery specialising in original prints and works on paper, and a studio which runs art courses and workshops. It represents international artists including Royal Academicians.

== Notable people ==
- Edward Pococke (1648–1726) was rector from 1692 until his death; there is a marble monument in the church. He was a son of the eminent Oriental scholar and clergyman Edward Pococke (1604–1691).
- George Lavington, later Bishop of Exeter, was born in 1684 at Mildenhall where his father Joseph was the rector.
- Tobias Young (d. 1824), painter, was probably born at Mildenhall
- Jack Ainslie (1921–2007), farmer and politician, lived and died in Mildenhall
- Reg Prentice, Baron Prentice (1923–2001), politician, died in Mildenhall

== See also ==
- Littlecote Roman Villa, a few miles east along the Kennet valley
