= Marlborough, Wiltshire =

Town and civil parish in England

Coordinates: 51.42°N 1.73°W

Marlborough
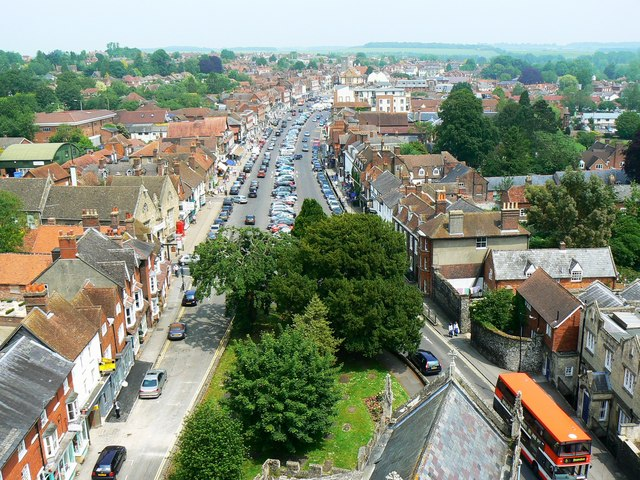
- High Street

- Location within Wiltshire
- Population: 9,129 (2021 Census)
- OS grid reference: SU1969
- Civil parish: Marlborough
- Unitary authority: Wiltshire
- Ceremonial county: Wiltshire
- Region: South West
- Country: England
- Sovereign state: United Kingdom
- Post town: Marlborough
- Postcode district: SN8
- Dialling code: 01672
- Police: Wiltshire
- Fire: Dorset and Wiltshire
- Ambulance: South Western
- UK Parliament: East Wiltshire
- Website: Town Council

Marlborough (/ˈmɔːlbərə/ MAWL-bər-ə) is a market town and civil parish in the English county of Wiltshire on the Old Bath Road, the old main road from London to Bath. The town is on the River Kennet, 24 miles (39 km) north of Salisbury and 10 miles (16 km) southeast of Swindon. In 2021 it had a population of 9,129.

== History ==
The earliest sign of human habitation is the Marlborough Mound, a 62-foot-high (19 m) prehistoric tumulus in the grounds of Marlborough College. Recent radiocarbon dating has found it to date from about 2400 BC. It is of similar age to the larger Silbury Hill about five miles (8 km) west of the town. Legend has it that the Mound is the burial site of Merlin and that the name of the town comes from Merlin's Barrow. More plausibly, the town's name possibly derives from the medieval term for chalky ground (marl) — thus, 'town on chalk'. However more recent research, from geographer John Everett-Heath, identifies the original Anglo-Saxon place name as Merleberge, with a derivation from either the personal name of Mærle ('Merlin') combined with beorg ('hill'), or meargealla beorg ('hill where gentian grows'). On John Speed's map of Wiltshire (1611), the town's name is recorded as Marlinges boroe. The town's motto is Ubi nunc sapientis ossa Merlini ('Where now are the bones of wise Merlin').

Further evidence of human occupation comes from the discovery in St Margaret's Mead of the Marlborough Bucket, an Iron Age burial bucket made of fir wood with three iron hoops, a top bar and two handles; it also sports bronze bands decorated with human heads and mythical animals, and is now on display at the Wiltshire Museum in Devizes.

Roman remains and the large Mildenhall Hoard of coins have been found two miles to the east of Marlborough, at Mildenhall (Cunetio). A later Saxon settlement grew up around The Green and two early river crossings were made at Isbury Lane and Stonebridge Lane.

In 1067, William the Conqueror assumed control of the Marlborough area and set about building a wooden motte-and-bailey castle, sited on the prehistoric mound. This was completed in around 1100. Stone was used to strengthen the castle in around 1175. The first written record of Marlborough dates from the Domesday Book in 1086. William also established a mint in Marlborough, which coined the William I and the early William II silver pennies. The coins display the name of the town as Maerlebi or Maerleber.

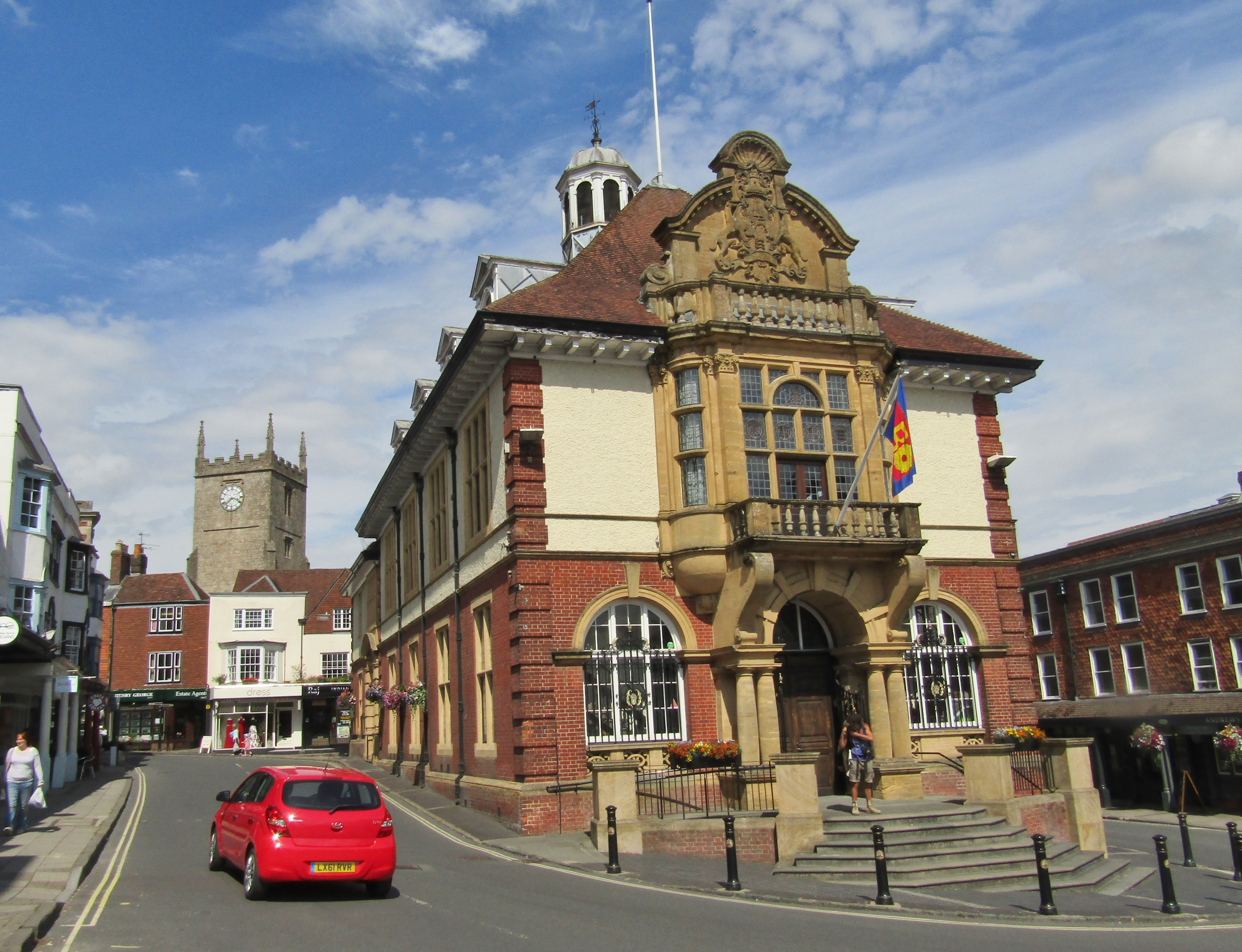
Marlborough Town Hall

He also established the neighbouring Savernake Forest as a favourite royal hunting ground and Marlborough castle became a Royal residence. Henry I observed Easter here in 1110. Henry II stayed at Marlborough castle in talks with the King of Scotland. His son, Richard I ("Coeur de Lion") gave the castle to his brother John, in 1186. King John was married here and spent time in Marlborough, where he established a Treasury.

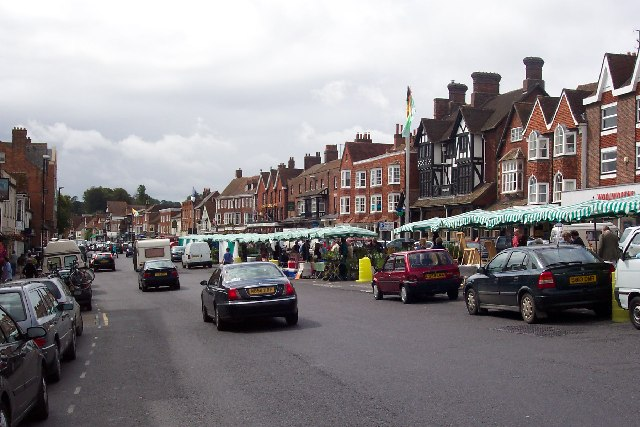
Marlborough Market in the High Street

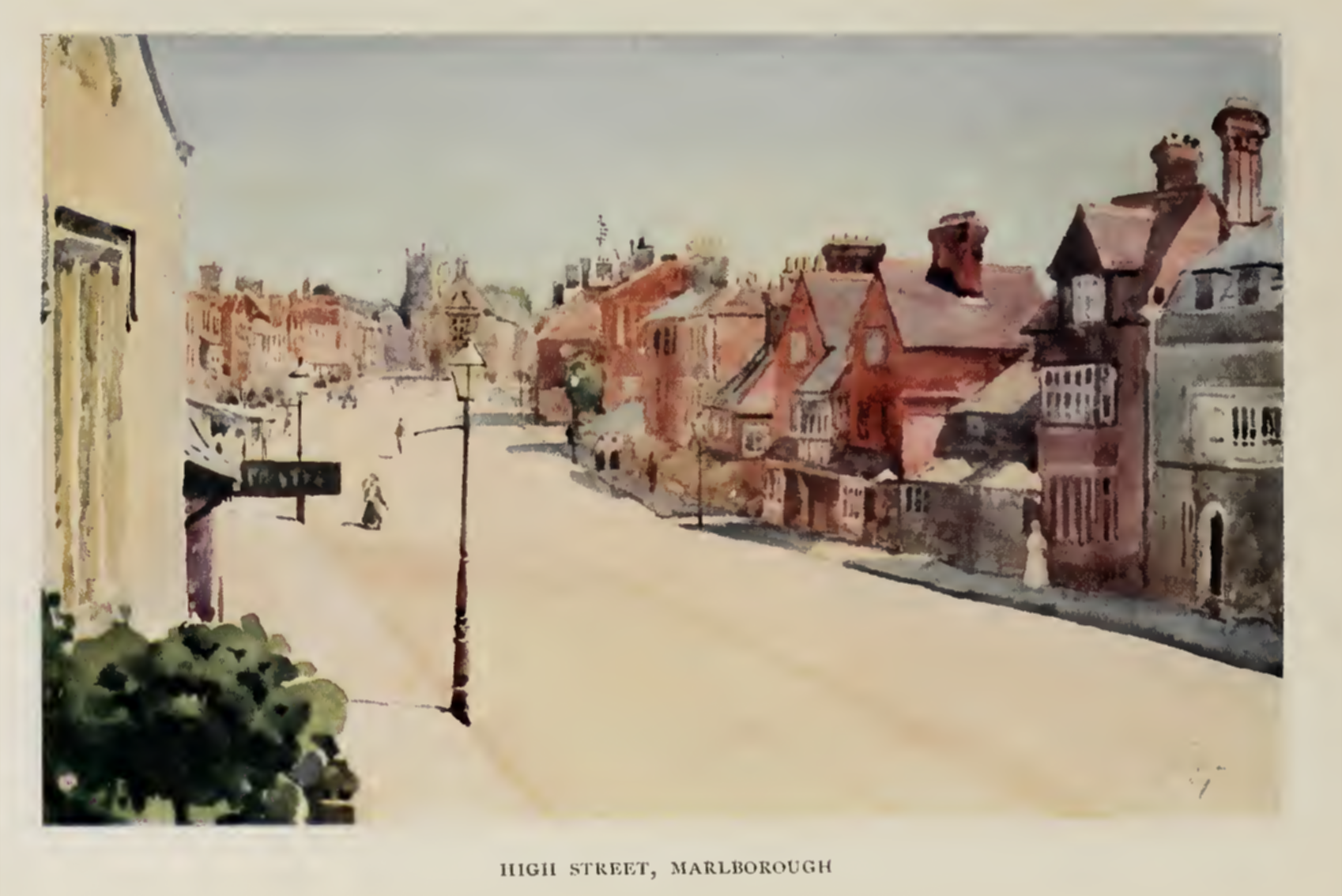
High Street c. 1900

In 1204 King John granted Charter to the Borough which permitted an annual eight-day fair, commencing on 14 August, the vigil of the Feast of the Assumption of Our Lady (15 August), in which "all might enjoy the liberties and quittances customary in the fair at Winchester". He also established that weekly markets may be held on Wednesdays and Saturdays. These continue to this day.

Henry III held Parliament here, in 1267, when the Statute of Marlborough was passed (this gave rights and privileges to small land owners and limited the right of the King to take possession of land). This law states that no-one shall seize his neighbour's goods for alleged wrong without permission of the court. Apart from charters, it is the oldest statute in English law which has not yet been repealed.

A Jewish community lived in the town from the 1230s, near Silver Street (now Silverless Street) and established a synagogue. In January 1275, Eleanor of Provence expelled Jews from all of the towns within her dower lands, and the Jews of Marlborough relocated to Devizes.

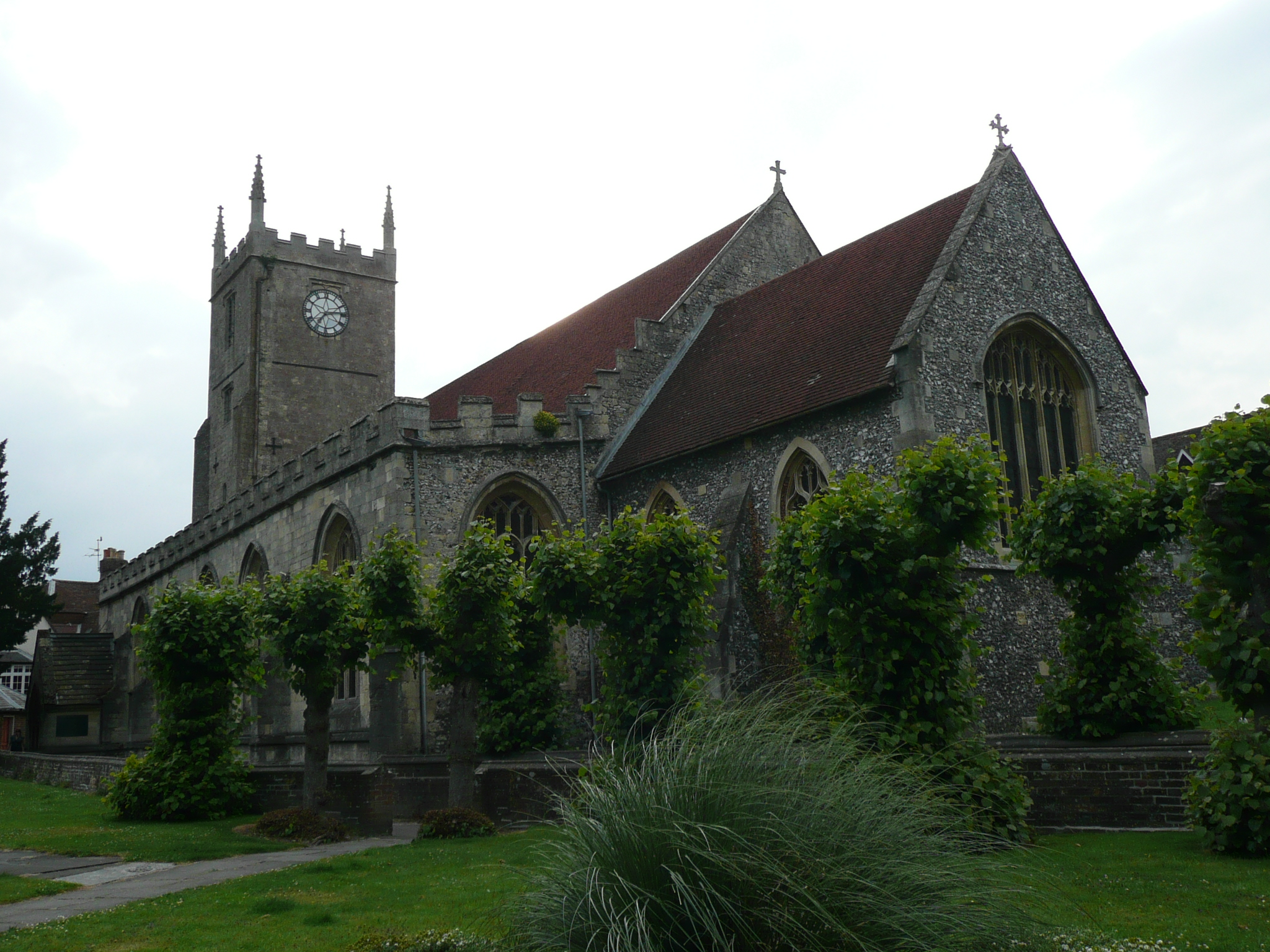
St Mary's parish church

The castle fell into disrepair by the end of the 14th century but remained Crown property. Edward VI then passed it to the Seymour family, his mother's relatives. In 1498 Thomas Wolsey was ordained priest in (the now redundant) St Peter's church. He later rose to become a cardinal and Lord Chancellor.

In 1642 Marlborough's peace was shattered by the English Civil War. The Seymours held the castle for the Cavaliers, but the town was Roundhead. With his headquarters in nearby Oxford, King Charles had to deal with Marlborough. "A Town the most notoriously disaffected of all that Country, otherwise, saving the obstinacy and malice of the inhabitants, in the situation of it very unfit for a garrison... this place the King saw would prove quickly an ill neighbour to him, not only as it was in the heart of a rich County, and so would straighten him, and even infest his quarters."

The King sent Lord Digby, who left Oxford to take the town at the head of four hundred horse on 24 November 1642. When he arrived, he chose to parley first, thus giving the inhabitants a chance to prepare defences and to recruit troops. They mustered about seven hundred poorly armed men. At this point, the town issued a reply to Digby: "The King's Majesty, providing he were attended in Royal and not in war like wise, should be as welcome to that town as ever was Prince to People; but as to delivering up the good Town of Marlborough to such a traitor as Lord Digby ... they would sooner die". After some early skirmishes, Royalist troops infiltrated the town down its small alleyways. The town was captured and looted and many buildings were set ablaze. One hundred and twenty prisoners were marched in chains to Oxford. The town was later abandoned by the King and took no further part in the war.

Marlborough (Wiltshire) Thatched Roofs Prohibition Act 1690
- Act of Parliament
- Parliament of England
- Long title: An Act to prohibit the covering of Houses and other Buildings with Thatch or Straw, in the Town of Marleborough, in the County of Wilts.
- Citation: 2 Will. & Mar. Sess. 2. c. 3 Pr.
- Territorial extent: England and Wales

Dates
- Royal assent: 18 November 1690
- Commencement: 2 October 1690 (Note: Start of session.)

Status: Current legislation

On 28 April 1653, the Great Fire of Marlborough started in a tanner's yard and spread quickly, eventually after four hours burning the Guildhall, St Mary's Church, the County Armoury, and 244 houses to the ground. This event attracted more than local attention; the parish register of Wotton-under-Edge in Gloucestershire records on 9 August 1653 that 18 pounds 17 shillings and six and a half pence had been collected in the parish for the relief of the distressed inhabitants of Marlborough. During the rebuilding of the town after the Great Fire, the high street was widened and is often claimed to be the widest in England, though the actual widest is in Stockton-on-Tees. This wide street allows ample space for the local market. Fire swept through the town again in 1679 and 1690. This time, an Act of Parliament was passed "to prohibit the covering of houses and other buildings with thatch in the Town of Marlborough".

In 1804, the Marlborough White Horse was cut on a downland slope southwest of the town by boys from Mr Greasley's Academy in the High Street.

In 1901 and 1934, the boundaries of the borough were extended to include the hamlet of Preshute (which was separated from Preshute civil parish) and the village of Manton, both to the west of the town. Marlborough Town Hall was completed in 1902.

In 2004, Marlborough celebrated 800 years of its town charter. Among the celebrations were a street play by the Marlborough Players titled Wheels of Time, and a visit from Charles, Prince of Wales.

== Events ==
The Marlborough mop fair was originally a market where local goods could be sold or bartered. It later developed into a hiring fair for agricultural workers seeking employment, but now has become a travelling funfair. It takes place over two weekends in October, as the "big mop" and "little mop" fairs. In 2014 these were set for 3–4 and 17–18 October.

From 1986 a music festival was held in the town for a number of days in June or July. In 1997 this became the Marlborough International Jazz Festival, which ceased after 2016.

== Notable buildings ==
The parish church of St Mary is a Grade I listed building.

St George's church in Preshute dates from the 12th century and was substantially restored in 1854 by T.H. Wyatt. It is Grade II* listed.

The Church of St Peter and St Paul at the west end of the High Street is Grade II* listed. It dates from the 15th century and was partly rebuilt by T.H. Wyatt in 1862–3. Cardinal Wolsey was ordained priest here in 1498.

On the north side of the High Street is the Merchant's House, which is currently under restoration although part is open to the public for guided tours on Tuesdays, Fridays and Saturdays from April to October. The house was built following the Great Fire of 1653. It was the property of a silk merchant and, rarely for a house of this type in a town centre, retains its original room pattern. Notable are the wall paintings recently uncovered, which are undergoing conservation. One room painted in a striped pattern, copying silk hangings, is perhaps unique in Great Britain.

== Governance ==
Marlborough is within the county of Wiltshire, and the administrative district of the same name. For local government purposes, it is administered by the Wiltshire Council unitary authority. Since the local boundary review of 2020, the parish has two wards – Marlborough East and Marlborough West. Marlborough and Manton collectively form a civil parish with a parish council known as the Marlborough Town Council, which has 16 councillors.

For elections to Wiltshire Council, the civil parish is covered by two electoral divisions, again named Marlborough East and Marlborough West, which each elect one member. They include large areas outside the town, the West division extending beyond Avebury. Prior to 2009, Marlborough was administered by Wiltshire Council at the county level and the Kennet District Council.

Marlborough was part of the Devizes constituency until 2024, when it was placed in the new East Wiltshire constituency; it has been represented in the House of Commons since the 2019 general election by Danny Kruger, a Conservative. (Note: As with all constituencies, East Wiltshire elects one Member of Parliament (MP) by the first past the post system of election at least every five years.) Its representative has been a Conservative since 1924.

== Education ==
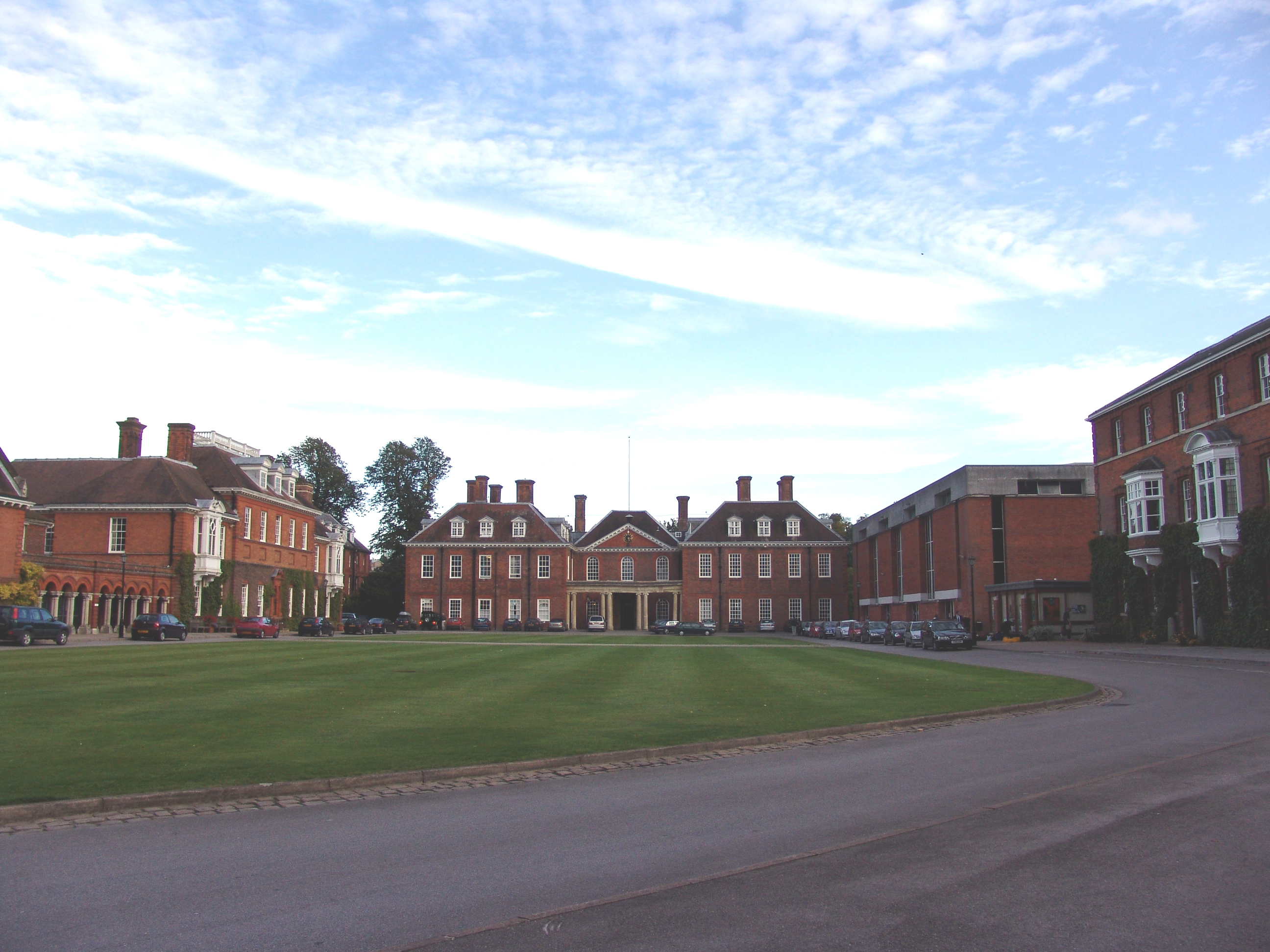
Marlborough College

Marlborough College, an independent boarding school, is on the west side of the town.

The town's local authority secondary school, St John's Academy, had been considered an above average school and sixth form college by Ofsted, and in the June 2014 report it was considered outstanding. It was formed when the former Marlborough Grammar School and secondary modern school were amalgamated. There is also a primary school, St Mary's.

== Sport ==
Marlborough is home to Marlborough Rugby Club, who completed their most successful season in recent history in the 2009–10 South West Division Dorset & Wilts 1 North league, winning all 22 games to secure promotion to the Southern Counties South league. In 2018, the first XV has competed in South West 1 East and in 2023, they were Regional 2 South East champions, winning promotion to tier 5 for the first time. The club has a second XV senior team as well as many junior players.

Marlborough Town F.C. play their home games at Elcot Lane, to the east of the town, and are members of the Wiltshire League. There is a youth football club, Marlborough Youth FC, with over 350 players that play in the North Wiltshire Youth Football League. There is a cricket team whose 1st X1 compete in the WEPL Wiltshire Premier Division.

Marlborough Hockey Club play at Marlborough College. A parkrun takes place on Marlborough Common every Saturday.

== Religion ==
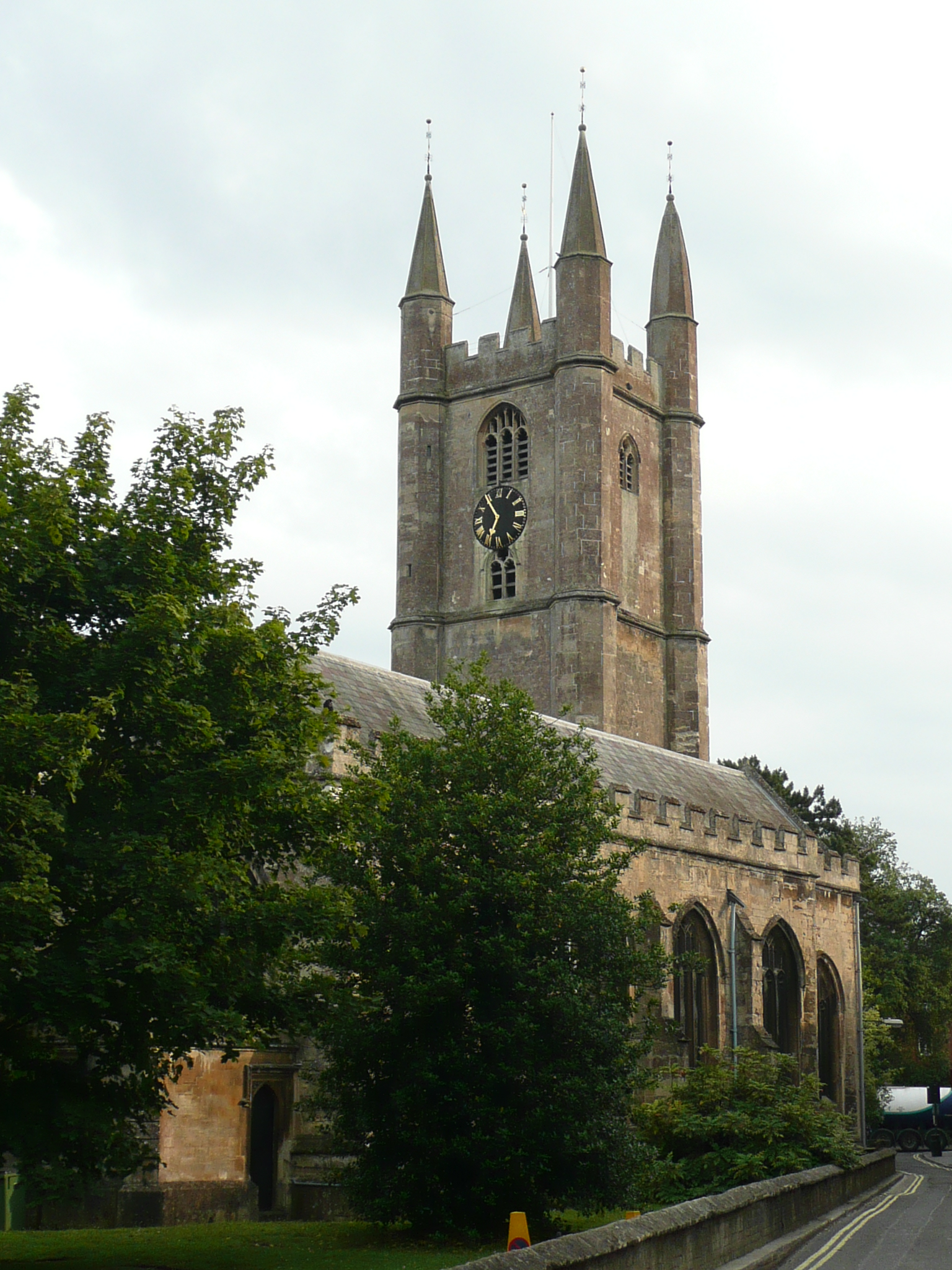
St Peter's former parish church

The town is at the heart of the Church of England Marlborough deanery in the diocese of Salisbury in the province of Canterbury. The rural dean has responsibility for the benefices of Marlborough, Ridgeway, Upper Kennet and Whitton which in total comprise 16 parishes. Of the town's two Church of England parish churches, St Peter's has been made redundant and converted into an arts centre. St Mary's, a grade I listed building, remains in use for worship.

The renowned jockey Sir Gordon Richards is buried in the new cemetery on Marlborough Common, the second of two such cemeteries to be opened after the two old churchyards stopped being used for burials.

== Media ==
Local TV services are provided by BBC West and ITV West Country, via the Mendip transmitting station and a local relay. Radio stations for the area are BBC Radio Wiltshire on 104.9 FM and Heart West on 96.5 FM. The local newspaper for the area is the Gazette and Herald.

== Transport ==
Although once served by two railway stations (on the Great Western Railway and the Midland and South Western Junction Railway), the town no longer has any direct rail access. The nearest stations are Pewsey (6.7 miles), Bedwyn (6.9 miles), and Swindon (12.7 miles). Marlborough is well connected by road with the A4 from Hungerford to Calne, A346 from Tidworth to Swindon and A345 from Salisbury meeting there.

The long-distance National Trail, the Wessex Ridgeway, runs from Marlborough to Lyme Regis in Dorset.

== Notable people ==
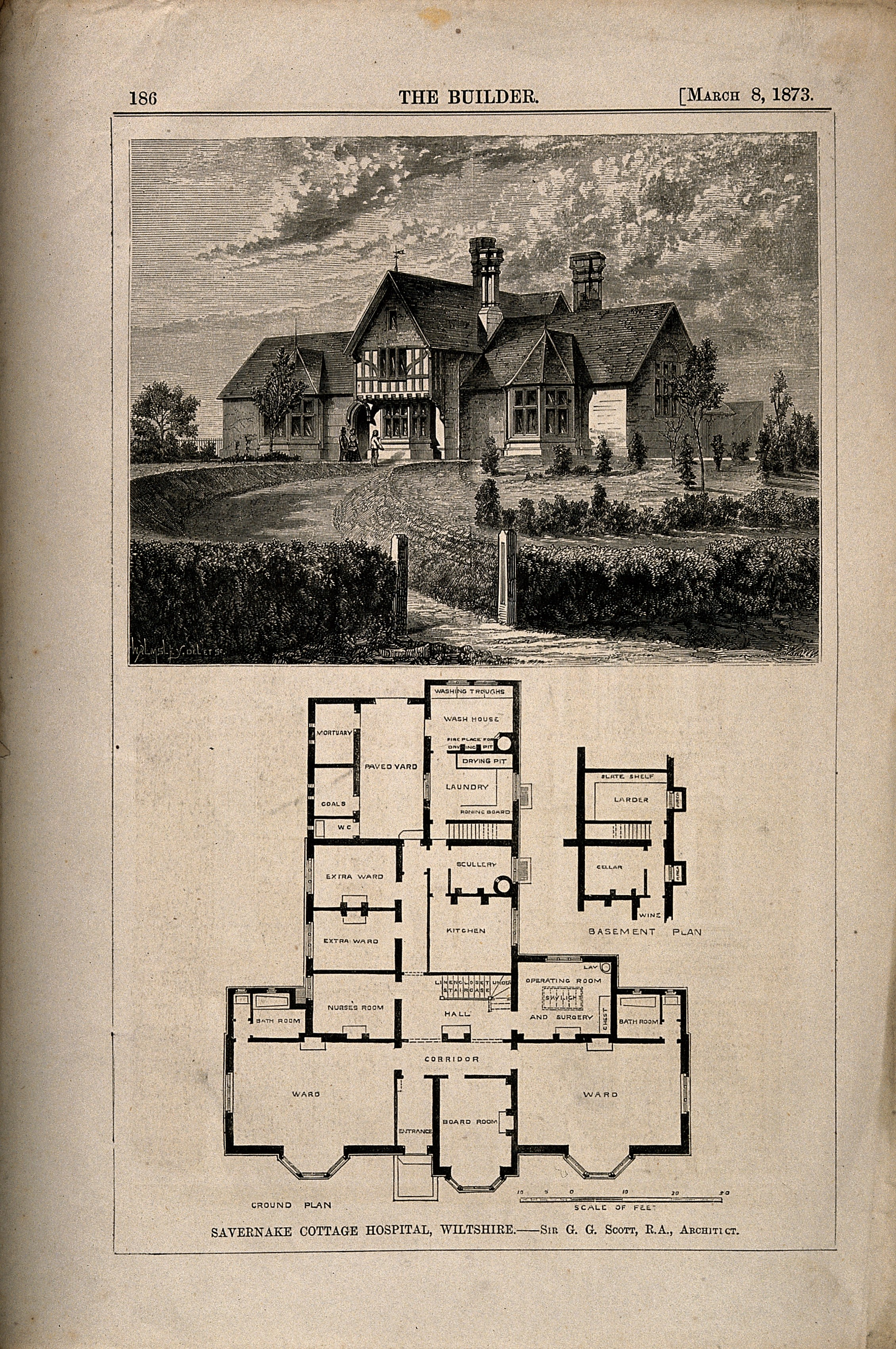
The Savernake Cottage Hospital, opened on London Road, Marlborough, in 1866

- Brett Angell, former footballer
- Bo Bruce, singer
- David Brudenell-Bruce, Earl of Cardigan, 31st hereditary warden of Savernake Forest
- Nick Drake, folk singer and guitarist. He kept regular correspondence with his parents during his time boarding there, and these letters are reprinted in the book "Remembered For A While". Both Drake's father and grandfather had been educated there too.
- William Golding, Nobel Prize winning author of Lord of the Flies grew up in the town.
- Charles Hancock, painter
- Thomas Hancock, inventor and manufacturing engineer
- Walter Hancock, inventor of steam powered road vehicles
- Phil Harding, Time Team archaeologist, was educated in the town
- John Ivimey (1868–1961), organist and composer, lived in Marlborough
- Eglantyne Jebb, founder of Save the Children Fund, taught at St. Peter's Junior School.
- Leonard Jennings, first-class cricketer and Royal Air Force officer
- Phillip Sheppard, geneticist
- Edward Thompson, second Chief Mechanical Engineer of the London and North Eastern Railway or L.N.E.R.

== Twin towns ==
Marlborough is twinned with:

- Gunjur, the Gambia, since 1982
- Margency, France, since 2002

== Climate ==
Marlborough has an oceanic climate somewhat influenced by its inland position and at 407 feet (124 m) elevation is more prone to frost than southern coastal areas. For example, in 1909 the town reported the equal lowest temperature in the UK at a station below 1,600 feet (500 m) for that year, with a temperature of −17.8 °C (0.0 °F) on 3 March.

Climate data for Marlborough (1991–2020)
Month	Jan	Feb	Mar	Apr	May	Jun	Jul	Aug	Sep	Oct	Nov	Dec	Year
Record high °C (°F)	13.4 (56.1)	16.1 (61.0)	21.7 (71.1)	25.5 (77.9)	30.6 (87.1)	30.6 (87.1)	33.3 (91.9)	34.6 (94.3)	29.4 (84.9)	26.7 (80.1)	17.8 (64.0)	15.0 (59.0)	34.6 (94.3)
Mean daily maximum °C (°F)	7.6 (45.7)	8.2 (46.8)	10.8 (51.4)	13.8 (56.8)	16.9 (62.4)	19.7 (67.5)	21.8 (71.2)	21.6 (70.9)	18.7 (65.7)	14.5 (58.1)	10.7 (51.3)	8.1 (46.6)	14.4 (57.9)
Daily mean °C (°F)	4.5 (40.1)	4.7 (40.5)	6.7 (44.1)	8.8 (47.8)	11.6 (52.9)	14.5 (58.1)	16.6 (61.9)	16.4 (61.5)	13.7 (56.7)	10.5 (50.9)	7.2 (45.0)	4.8 (40.6)	10.0 (50.0)
Mean daily minimum °C (°F)	1.5 (34.7)	1.3 (34.3)	2.5 (36.5)	3.9 (39.0)	6.4 (43.5)	9.3 (48.7)	11.4 (52.5)	11.1 (52.0)	8.8 (47.8)	6.6 (43.9)	3.7 (38.7)	1.5 (34.7)	5.7 (42.3)
Record low °C (°F)	−16.7 (1.9)	−16.7 (1.9)	−13.9 (7.0)	−6.1 (21.0)	−5.6 (21.9)	−1.7 (28.9)	1.1 (34.0)	0.0 (32.0)	−3.1 (26.4)	−7.8 (18.0)	−10.0 (14.0)	−19.0 (−2.2)	−19.0 (−2.2)
Average precipitation mm (inches)	87.0 (3.43)	60.4 (2.38)	57.5 (2.26)	58.5 (2.30)	57.5 (2.26)	55.6 (2.19)	65.4 (2.57)	68.4 (2.69)	60.8 (2.39)	88.6 (3.49)	92.0 (3.62)	89.5 (3.52)	841.0 (33.11)
Average precipitation days (≥ 1.0 mm)	13.0	11.0	10.1	10.3	9.8	9.3	9.5	10.8	9.6	12.0	13.5	13.1	132.0
Mean monthly sunshine hours	53.4	74.9	115.0	169.4	197.4	193.9	209.9	185.4	149.8	101.8	63.4	49.2	1,563.3
Source 1: Met Office
Source 2: Starlings Roost Weather

== See also ==
- Duke of Marlborough (title) - the title references the town
