= Manton, Wiltshire =

Manton
- Village
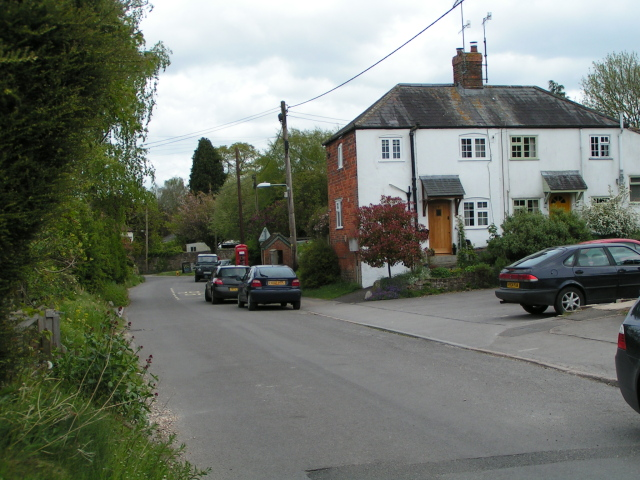
- Interactive map of Manton
- Coordinates: 51.416°N 1.753°W
- Country: England
- County: Wiltshire
- Civil parish: Marlborough

Manton is a suburb of the town of Marlborough in Wiltshire, England, just off the A4 Bath Road.

== History ==
A settlement of twelve households and an estate held by Miles Crispin were recorded at Manetone in the 1087 Domesday Book. In the 17th century the estate came into the ownership of the earls and marquesses of Ailesbury, whose seat was nearby at Tottenham House; their ownership continued into the 20th century.

Manton was a tithing of Preshute parish until 1934, when it was transferred to Marlborough civil parish.

== Local economy ==
A small industrial estate on the A4 to the west of Manton houses several businesses including the headquarters of P&M Aviation, a manufacturer of ultralight aircraft.

== Amenities ==
The village primary school is Preshute Primary School, which feeds into St Johns Academy in Marlborough. The village has a pub, the Oddfellows.

The Anglican Church of St George is 0.5 miles (0.80 km) east of the village, next to Preshute House. This settlement was identified as Preshute as recently as the 1961 (7th series) Ordnance Survey map but on current maps and road signs it is part of Manton. There was a church at Preshute in the 12th century, and possibly earlier; fragments of 12th-century masonry survive. The font of black Tournai marble, 12th century, said to have been brought from St. Nicholas's chapel in Marlborough Castle in the 15th or 16th centuries, is described by Pevsner as a "truly amazing piece". The church was rebuilt, on the same foundations and retaining the 15th-century tower, by T.H. Wyatt in 1854; it is Grade II* listed. Today the parish is part of the Marlborough Anglican Team, together with St Mary's in Marlborough and St John the Baptist at Mildenhall.

== The Manton Estate ==
The Manton Estate is 2 miles (3.2 km) northwest of the village, on the Marlborough Downs in the parish of Preshute. It includes Manton House, Manton Lodge and Manton House Stables, currently operated by thoroughbred horse trainer Brian Meehan. The stables were established in the 1860s by Alec Taylor and then run by his son Alec Taylor, Jr. The estate was purchased by Leeds-born soap manufacturer Joseph Watson (died 1922), who in 1921 won the Oaks with Love in Idleness and came 3rd in the Derby with Lemonora; in 1922 he was raised to the peerage as Baron Manton. Later the estate was acquired by the Sangster family.
