= Badbury Park, Eldene and Liden =

Ward of Swindon Borough Council

- ward Swindon Borough Council
- Major settlements: Badbury Park; Eldene; Liden

Current ward
- Created: 2026
- Councillor: Mike Davies (Labour)
- Councillor: Rebecca Banwell-Moore (Labour)
- Councillor: Simon Howard (Reform)
- Number of councillors: 2
- Created from: Liden, Eldene and Park South; Chiseldon and Lawn
- UK Parliament constituency: Swindon South

Badbury Park, Eldene and Liden is an electoral ward in Swindon, Wiltshire, England, which elects three members of Swindon Borough Council. It has been represented by Mike Davies and Rebecca Banwell-Moore of the Labour Party and Simon Howard of Reform UK since 2026.

The ward was created as part of boundary changes prior to the 2026 local elections, incorporating parts of the former wards of Liden, Eldene and Park South and Chiseldon and Lawn.

== Ward profile ==
The ward is located in the east-southeast of Swindon. Eldene and Liden are 1960s suburbs, while the more recent Badbury Park was developed in the 2010s and is located adjacent to Great Western Hospital.

The industrial area of Dorcan also lies within the ward. For general elections, the vast majority of the ward is part of the Swindon South constituency, but fractional parts are in East Wiltshire.

== Councillors ==
Election	Councillors (3 seats)		
2026	Mike Davies (Labour)	Rebecca Banwell-Moore (Labour)	Simon Howard (Reform)

== Election results ==
2026 Swindon Borough Council election: Badbury Park, Eldene and Liden (3 seats)
Party	Candidate	Votes	%
Labour Co-op	Mike Davies*	1,135	33.2
Labour Co-op	Rebecca Banwell-Moore	1,132	33.1
Reform	Simon Howard	1,021	29.8
Conservative	Bazil Solomon	1,001	29.3
Labour Co-op	Marianne Coyte-Grinney	997	29.1
Conservative	Sally Hawson	985	28.8
Reform	Gerald Rogers	975	28.5
Reform	Martin Costello	968	28.3
Conservative	Zachary Hawson	896	26.2
Green	Emma Brits	477	13.9
Green	Adrian Russell	400	11.7
Liberal Democrats	Malcolm Salmon	277	8.1
Turnout		3,696	43.4
Registered electors		8,514	
Labour Co-op win (new seat)			
Labour Co-op win (new seat)			
Reform win (new seat)			

== See also ==
- List of electoral divisions and wards in Wiltshire
