= 2026 Swindon Borough Council election =

2026 English local government election

- 7 May 2026

All 57 seats to Swindon Borough Council 29 seats needed for a majority
- Registered: 169,899
- Turnout: 74,253; 43.7% (▲12.7 pp)
	First party	Second party	Third party
Leader	Gary Sumner	Jim Robbins	Sara Godwin
Party	Conservative	Labour	Reform
Last election	15 seats, 35.5%	41 seats, 50.2%	0 seats, 0.6%
Seats before	16	34	0
Seats won	23	19	14
Seat change	▲7	▼15	▲14
Popular vote	51,126	48,189	45,670
Percentage	29.7%	28.0%	26.5%
Swing	▼5.7 pp	▼22.2 pp	▲25.9 pp
	Fourth party	Fifth party	Sixth party
Leader	Adam Poole (retiring)	Tom Butcher (defeated)
Party	Liberal Democrats	Green	Independent
Last election	1 seat, 9.8%	0 seats, 5.0%	0 seats, 1.4%
Seats before	1	4	2
Seats won	1	0	0
Seat change	Steady	▼4	▼2
Popular vote	8,147	18,962	Did not stand
Percentage	4.7%	11.0%	Did not stand
Swing	▼5.1 pp	▲6.0 pp	▼1.4 pp
- Results by ward
Leader before election
Jim Robbins
Labour
Leader after election
Gary Sumner
Conservative
No overall control (Note: Conservative minority)

Elections to Swindon Borough Council in Wiltshire, England, were held on 7 May 2026, the same day as other local elections across England. All 57 seats were contested; this was the first all-out election since 2012.

The Labour Party, who had governed the council since 2023 under leader Jim Robbins, suffered heavy losses in line with the national trend and lost overall control. The Conservative Party regained their status as the largest party on the council which they had lost three years prior, but fell short of a majority. The Conservatives subsequently formed a minority administration, with group leader Gary Sumner being formally appointed as the new leader of the council on 22 May 2026 with the support of Reform UK, who made large gains and won their first elected councillors in the borough.

In terms of other parties, the Liberal Democrats' vote share halved but they retained their sole seat. The Green Party more than doubled their vote share and recorded their highest ever result in Swindon, but failed to hold any of the four seats they had gained as a result of defections from Labour in 2025.

== Background ==
At the previous council election, Labour kept overall majority control of the council with 41 out of 57 seats, with the Conservatives having 15 seats. In 2025, four Labour councillors defected to the Green Party.

New warding came into effect at these elections.

== Previous council composition ==
After 2024 election		Before 2026 election		Change
Party	Seats	Party	Seats	Change
Labour	41	Labour	34	▼7
Conservative	15	Conservative	16	▲1
Green	0	Green	4	▲4
Liberal Democrats	1	Liberal Democrats	1	Steady
Independent	0	Independent	2	▲2

=== Changes 2024–2026 ===
Name	Date	From	To	Ward	Reason
Will Stone	September 2024	Labour	Vacant	Rodbourne Cheney	Resignation after being elected to Swindon North in the UK Parliament.
Sudha Nukana	17 October 2024	Vacant	Conservative	Rodbourne Cheney	Gained ward from Labour in a by-election.
Matt Lodge	March 2025	Labour	Independent	Haydon Wick	Left the Labour Party to sit as independents.
Ian Edwards	September 2025	Labour	Independent	Priory Vale	Left the Labour Party to sit as independents.
Sean Wilson	September 2025	Labour	Independent	Lydiard and Freshbrook	Left the Labour Party to sit as independents.
Repi Begum	October 2025	Labour	Green	Lydiard and Freshbrook	Defected to the Green Party.
Tom Butcher	October 2025	Labour	Green	St Margaret and South Marston	Defected to the Green Party.
Ian Edwards	October 2025	Independent	Green	Priory Vale	Joined the Green Party.
Rob Heath	November 2025	Labour	Green	Priory Vale	Defected to the Green Party.

== Results summary ==
Turnout was 43.7%, well up from the 31.0% in 2024.

No party won a majority in the Swindon Borough Council, but the Conservative Party had the highest absolute number of councillors, followed closely by the Labour Party and Reform, who had 23, 19 and 14 seats respectively. As a result, a coalition between Conservative and Labour was formed.

2026 Swindon Borough Council election
Party	This election				Full council			This election		
Party	Candidates	Seats	Net	Seats %	Other	Total	Total %	Votes	Votes %	+/−
Conservative	{{{candidates}}}	23	▲7	40.4	0	23	40.4	51,126	29.7	–5.7
Labour	{{{candidates}}}	19	▼15	33.3	0	19	33.3	48,189	29.0	–22.2
Reform	{{{candidates}}}	14	▲14	24.6	0	14	24.4	45,670	26.5	+25.9
Liberal Democrats	{{{candidates}}}	1	Steady	1.8	0	1	1.8	8,147	4.7	–5.1
Green	{{{candidates}}}	0	▼4	0.0	0	0	0.0	18,962	11.0	+6.0
TUSC	{{{candidates}}}	0	Steady	0.0	0	0	0.0	159	0.1	–0.7
Independent	{{{candidates}}}	0	▼2	0.0	0	0	0.0	N/A (Note: Did not stand candidates.)	N/A	–1.4

== Ward results ==
Candidates for each ward were confirmed on 9 April 2026.

=== Badbury Park, Eldene & Liden ===
Badbury Park, Eldene & Liden (3 seats)
Party	Candidate	Votes	%
Labour Co-op	Mike Davies*	1,135	33.2
Labour Co-op	Rebecca Banwell-Moore	1,132	33.1
Reform	Simon Howard	1,021	29.8
Conservative	Bazil Solomon	1,001	29.3
Labour Co-op	Marianne Coyte-Grinney	997	29.1
Conservative	Sally Hawson	985	28.8
Reform	Gerald Rogers	975	28.5
Reform	Martin Costello	968	28.3
Conservative	Zachary Hawson	896	26.2
Green	Emma Brits	477	13.9
Green	Adrian Russell	400	11.7
Liberal Democrats	Malcolm Salmon	277	8.1
Turnout		3,696	43.4
Registered electors		8,514	
Labour Co-op win (new seat)			
Labour Co-op win (new seat)			
Reform win (new seat)			

=== Blunsdon ===
Blunsdon
Party	Candidate	Votes	%
Conservative	Nick Gardiner*	558	42.9
Reform	Luke Bennett	362	27.8
Labour Co-op	Steffan Rick	164	12.6
Green	Andrew Day	127	9.8
Liberal Democrats	Jessica Frankopan	91	7.0
Majority		196	15.1
Turnout		1,305	47.4
Registered electors		2,752	
Conservative win (new seat)			

=== Broadgreen ===
Broadgreen
Party	Candidate	Votes	%
Conservative	Anabelle Pegado*	1,247	44.0
Labour Co-op	Adorabelle Amaral-Shaikh	1,220	43.1
Conservative	Miguel Vintur-Fernandes	1,196	42.2
Labour Co-op	Domingos Dias*	959	33.8
Green	Muhammad Hamid	347	12.2
Reform	Stephen Booth	288	10.2
Reform	Marcus Phillips	278	9.8
Liberal Democrats	Marek Sarnowski	132	4.7
Turnout		3,004	54.7
Registered electors		5,497	
Conservative win (new seat)			
Labour Co-op win (new seat)			

=== Chiseldon & Ridgeway ===
Chiseldon & Ridgeway (2 seats)
Party	Candidate	Votes	%
Conservative	Gary Sumner*	1,147	49.2
Conservative	Matt Hinton	1,045	44.9
Liberal Democrats	Liz Mearns	651	28.0
Reform	Bryan Davis	481	20.7
Reform	Ayesha Noureen	413	17.7
Liberal Democrats	Calum Murphy	381	16.4
Green	Adrian Rogers	224	9.6
Labour	Steve Allsopp	197	8.5
Labour	Haydar Pacci	119	5.1
Turnout		2,469	53.3
Registered electors		4,630	
Conservative win (new seat)			
Conservative win (new seat)			

=== Covingham & Nythe ===
Covingham & Nythe (2 seats)
Party	Candidate	Votes	%
Conservative	Kevin Parry*	1,638	53.2
Conservative	Barbara Parry*	1,550	50.3
Reform	Michelle Read	897	29.1
Reform	Casey Sherwood	825	26.8
Labour	Zohaib Ali Khan	522	16.9
Labour	Tomas Silberberg	501	16.3
Liberal Democrats	Jim Morrish	178	5.8
TUSC	Scott Hunter	50	1.6
Turnout		3,227	49.5
Registered electors		6,514	
Conservative win (new seat)			
Conservative win (new seat)			

=== Gorse Hill ===
Gorse Hill
Party	Candidate	Votes	%
Labour Co-op	Princia Fernandes*	608	45.1
Reform	Corey Reeds	308	22.8
Conservative	Chichi Morris	226	16.8
Green	Kayum Miah	156	11.6
Liberal Democrats	Hannah Pajak	50	3.7
Majority		300	22.3
Turnout		1,373	43.2
Registered electors		3,176	
Labour Co-op win (new seat)			

=== Haydon Wick ===
Haydon Wick (3 seats)
Party	Candidate	Votes	%	±%
Reform	James Head	1,317	36.6	N/A
Reform	Anthony Hedges	1,304	36.3	N/A
Labour Co-op	Stanka Wilson*	1,190	33.1	–17.2
Reform	Paul Rostron	1,152	32.0	N/A
Conservative	Leigh Jackson	1,065	29.6	–9.3
Labour Co-op	Ravi Venkatesh*	1,032	28.7	–21.6
Conservative	John Jackson	1,024	28.5	–10.4
Labour Co-op	Leroy Roberts	994	27.6	–22.7
Conservative	Sudha Nukana	822	22.9	–16.0
Green	Steven Trafford	520	14.5	N/A
Liberal Democrats	Phil Norris	369	10.3	+0.8
Turnout		4,053	44.7	+13.7
Registered electors		9,062		
Reform gain from Labour				
Reform gain from Independent				
Labour Co-op hold				

=== Highworth ===
Highworth (2 seats)
Party	Candidate	Votes	%
Conservative	Vijay Manro*	1,516	49.4
Conservative	Steve Weisinger*	1,384	45.1
Reform	Craig Chafer	780	25.4
Reform	Tony Trinder	699	22.8
Labour Co-op	Ewan Nicholas	581	18.9
Green	Owen Hall	530	17.3
Labour Co-op	Tyler Gutteridge	357	11.6
Liberal Democrats	Stephen Crocker	289	9.4
Turnout		3,220	48.5
Registered electors		6,634	
Conservative win (new seat)			
Conservative win (new seat)			

=== Kingshill ===
Kingshill (2 seats)
Party	Candidate	Votes	%
Labour Co-op	Chris Watts*	942	38.2
Labour Co-op	Janine Howarth*	929	37.7
Green	Rosie Leather	699	28.4
Green	Marcus Kittridge	633	25.7
Reform	Peter Major	534	21.7
Reform	Daphne Chikwere	506	20.5
Conservative	Srinivasu Anupindi	298	12.1
Conservative	Nima Eftekhari	266	10.8
Liberal Democrats	Jamie Taylor	120	4.9
Turnout		2,589	45.5
Registered electors		5,689	
Labour Co-op win (new seat)			
Labour Co-op win (new seat)			

=== Lower Stratton ===
Lower Stratton (3 seats)
Party	Candidate	Votes	%
Conservative	Roger Smith	1,283	37.4
Conservative	Marco Di Pinto	1,280	37.4
Reform	Andrew Cripps	1,165	34.0
Reform	James Faulkner	1,123	32.8
Reform	Justin Bandi	1,114	32.5
Conservative	Tom Smith	1,054	31.1
Labour	Dave Graves	762	22.5
Green	Josh Barclay	719	21.2
Labour	Mustafa Dayan	669	19.7
Labour	Cesar Hernandez-Martinez	657	19.4
Liberal Democrats	Lynda Comber	342	10.1
Turnout		3,825	42.5
Registered electors		8,993	
Conservative win (new seat)			
Conservative win (new seat)			
Reform win (new seat)			

=== Lydiard, Freshbrook & Toothill ===
Lydiard, Freshbrook & Toothill (3 seats)
Party	Candidate	Votes	%
Reform	Matthew Goulding	1,346	34.3
Reform	Colin Lovell	1,290	32.8
Reform	Cathy Williamson	1,259	32.1
Labour Co-op	Leon Grother*	1,173	29.9
Labour Co-op	Anna Delvecchio-John	1,156	29.4
Conservative	Luke Dawson	990	25.2
Labour Co-op	Jane Milner-Barry*	976	24.9
Conservative	Caryl Sydney-Smith	941	24.0
Conservative	Joel Fletcher-Swindlehurst	877	22.3
Green	Glynis Hales	572	14.6
Green	Sarah Sawyer	471	12.0
Green	Jai Bhatoolaul	466	11.9
Liberal Democrats	Fraser McCormick	241	6.1
TUSC	Rob Pettefar	24	0.6
Turnout		4,193	42.9
Registered electors		9,759	
Reform win (new seat)			
Reform win (new seat)			
Reform win (new seat)			

=== Old Town & Lawn ===
Old Town & Lawn (3 seats)
Party	Candidate	Votes	%
Labour Co-op	Nadine Watts*	2,006	43.5
Labour Co-op	Jim Robbins*	1,840	39.9
Labour Co-op	Neil Hopkins*	1,820	39.5
Conservative	Vince Ayris	1,216	26.4
Reform	Beverley Lewis	993	21.6
Reform	Mark Lewis	987	21.4
Conservative	Lawrence Elliott*	932	20.2
Reform	Richard Symonds	913	19.8
Conservative	Bhawna Goyal	845	18.3
Green	Bill Hughes	730	15.8
Green	Andy Bentley	642	13.9
Green	Peter Hebden	586	12.7
Liberal Democrats	Ciaran Skinner	312	6.8
Turnout		4,849	50.1
Registered electors		9,681	
Labour Co-op win (new seat)			
Labour Co-op win (new seat)			
Labour Co-op win (new seat)			

=== Parks ===
Parks (2 seats)
Party	Candidate	Votes	%
Labour	Jocelina D'Souza	848	42.0
Reform	Sara Godwin	740	36.6
Reform	Stephen Halden	659	32.6
Labour Co-op	Jamal Miah*	640	31.7
Conservative	Gyan Gurung	394	19.5
Green	Charli Nettle	322	15.9
Conservative	Dev Patel	273	13.5
Liberal Democrats	Maggie Hathaway-Mills	166	8.2
Turnout		2,262	32.9
Registered electors		6,867	
Labour win (new seat)			
Reform win (new seat)			

=== Penhill & Pinehurst ===
Penhill & Pinehurst (2 seats)
Party	Candidate	Votes	%
Reform	Mark Bogard	792	40.2
Reform	Martyn Pearce	738	37.4
Labour Co-op	John Ballman*	619	31.4
Labour Co-op	Sandra Absalom	588	29.8
Conservative	Rouchell Cardoso	335	17.0
Green	Howard March	316	16.0
Conservative	Adam John	277	14.1
Green	Elly Taylor	277	14.1
Turnout		2,109	30.9
Registered electors		6,837	
Reform win (new seat)			
Reform win (new seat)			

=== Priory Vale ===
Priory Vale (3 seats)
Party	Candidate	Votes	%	±%
Conservative	Vinay Manro*	1,236	38.5	–4.1
Conservative	Leanne Stevenson	1,004	31.3	–11.3
Conservative	Alex Hughes	998	31.1	–11.5
Reform	Adam Brookman	920	28.6	N/A
Reform	Chris Fulgoni	829	25.8	N/A
Reform	Ravi Tiwari	769	23.9	N/A
Labour Co-op	Junab Ali*	688	21.4	–24.4
Labour Co-op	Paul Park	681	21.2	–24.6
Labour Co-op	Rajhia Ali*	665	20.7	–25.1
Green	Ian Edwards*	628	19.6	+12.8
Green	Rob Heath*	577	18.0	+11.2
Green	Brooke Linnet	454	14.1	+7.3
Liberal Democrats	Jim Coupland	185	5.8	+1.8
Turnout		3,532	40.4	+11.3
Registered electors		8,748		
Conservative gain from Green				
Conservative gain from Green				
Conservative gain from Labour Co-op				

=== Queen's Park ===
Queen's Park (3 seats)
Party	Candidate	Votes	%
Labour Co-op	Imtiyaz Shaikh*	1,317	40.4
Labour Co-op	Paul Dixon*	1,307	40.1
Labour Co-op	Marina Strinkovsky*	1,179	36.1
Green	Tom Butcher*	984	30.2
Green	Repi Begum*	899	27.6
Green	Shad Chokdar	781	23.9
Conservative	Livio Camelo	604	18.5
Conservative	Inacio Da Silva	604	18.5
Conservative	Jenny Jefferies	544	16.7
Reform	Paul Collis	475	14.6
Reform	Martin England	467	14.3
Reform	Terrence Reynolds	434	13.3
Liberal Democrats	Abdel Musa	159	4.9
TUSC	Mary Quate	31	1.0
Turnout		3,469	44.3
Registered electors		7,824	
Labour Co-op win (new seat)			
Labour Co-op win (new seat)			
Labour Co-op win (new seat)			

=== Rodbourne Cheney ===
Rodbourne Cheney (2 seats)
Party	Candidate	Votes	%	±%
Reform	Lawrence Davies	828	47.8	N/A
Reform	Derek O'Hanlon	775	44.7	N/A
Labour Co-op	Joy Grotzinger	500	28.9	–24.5
Labour Co-op	Thomas Smith*	441	25.5	–27.9
Green	Grant Holman	306	17.7	+9.0
Conservative	Niyi Adekoya	239	13.8	–18.9
Conservative	Bose Patrick-Okoh	230	13.3	–19.4
Liberal Democrats	Zoe McCormick	114	6.6	+2.2
TUSC	Christopher Mahon	31	1.8	N/A
Turnout		1,921	32.0	+3.3
Registered electors		5,997		
Reform gain from Labour				
Reform gain from Conservative				

=== Rodbourne Ferndale & Western ===
Rodbourne Ferndale & Western
Party	Candidate	Votes	%
Labour Co-op	Ana Fernandes*	1,512	40.9
Labour Co-op	Kevin Small*	1,436	38.9
Labour Co-op	Jim Grant*	1,351	36.6
Reform	Vanessa Boyd	975	26.4
Reform	Richard Forbes	928	25.1
Reform	Paul Glover	918	24.8
Conservative	Natasha Vas	888	24.0
Conservative	Kaine Collins	756	20.5
Conservative	Bhagyesh Soni	633	17.1
Green	Alexandra Petrache	604	16.3
Green	Caitlin Pinks	550	14.9
Green	James Tansey	537	14.5
Turnout		4,000	42.6
Registered electors		9,390	
Labour Co-op win (new seat)			
Labour Co-op win (new seat)			
Labour Co-op win (new seat)			

=== Shaw & Westlea ===
Shaw & Westlea (3 seats)
Party	Candidate	Votes	%
Conservative	Keith Williams	1,487	35.0
Conservative	Suresh Gattapur	1,483	34.9
Conservative	Nanadini Singh	1,456	34.2
Labour Co-op	Fay Howard*	1,298	30.5
Labour Co-op	Rose Llewellyn*	1,207	28.4
Reform	Darren Chappell	1,151	27.1
Reform	Allan Gibson	1,115	26.2
Reform	Glyn Pullen	1,089	25.6
Labour Co-op	Josh Owen	1,020	24.0
Green	Matt Barnes	602	14.2
Green	Ed Colton	513	12.1
Liberal Democrats	James Farr	342	8.0
Turnout		4,564	48.1
Registered electors		9,497	
Conservative win (new seat)			
Conservative win (new seat)			
Conservative win (new seat)			

=== South Marston ===
South Marston
Party	Candidate	Votes	%
Conservative	Matthew Vallender*	361	78.8
Reform	Eddie Costello	63	13.8
Labour	Javes Rodrigues	25	5.5
Liberal Democrats	David McCabe	9	2.0
Majority		298	65.0
Turnout		458	59.3
Registered electors		773	
Conservative hold			

=== St Andrews East ===
St Andrews East (2 seats)
Party	Candidate	Votes	%
Conservative	Jake Chandler*	1,298	52.1
Conservative	Kate Tomlinson	1,281	51.5
Reform	Daniel Marland	604	24.3
Reform	Brigid Watkis	549	22.1
Labour Co-op	Carol Shelley*	483	19.4
Labour Co-op	Simon Shelley*	385	15.5
Green	Chris Payne	379	15.2
Turnout		2,676	43.6
Registered electors		6,134	
Conservative win (new seat)			
Conservative win (new seat)			

=== St Andrews West & Tadpole ===
St Andrews West and Tadpole (2 seats)
Party	Candidate	Votes	%
Conservative	Daniel Adams*	1,086	43.5
Conservative	Cherie Adams	881	35.3
Reform	Marjorie Jefferies	608	24.4
Labour Co-op	Jason Mills*	605	24.2
Labour Co-op	Theresa Draper	596	23.9
Reform	Vincent Williams	593	23.8
Green	Syed Bukhari	450	18.0
Liberal Democrats	Dawn Pajak	174	7.0
Turnout		2,694	37.6
Registered electors		7,164	
Conservative win (new seat)			
Conservative win (new seat)			

=== Upper Stratton ===
Upper Stratton (2 seats)
Party	Candidate	Votes	%
Reform	Mark Ratcliffe	970	38.7
Reform	Gordon Slade	855	34.1
Conservative	David-Oladapo Ibitoye	756	30.2
Labour Co-op	Claire Crilly*	736	29.4
Conservative	Ola Ibitoye	625	24.9
Labour Co-op	Danial Vales	499	19.9
Green	Laura Butcher	366	14.6
Liberal Democrats	Ben Scott	182	7.3
TUSC	Dezzy Scott	23	0.9
Turnout		2,659	41.5
Registered electors		6,405	
Reform win (new seat)			
Reform win (new seat)			

=== Walcot ===
Walcot (2 seats)
Party	Candidate	Votes	%
Labour Co-op	Emma Bushell*	1,057	47.9
Labour Co-op	Abdul Amin*	997	45.2
Reform	Terry Nicholls	552	25.0
Reform	Unni Nair	502	22.8
Conservative	John Lenton	379	17.2
Green	Jane Parsons-Hann	356	16.1
Conservative	William Sumner	349	15.8
Liberal Democrats	Michael Dickinson	219	9.9
Turnout		2,358	41.2
Registered electors		5,727	
Labour Co-op win (new seat)			
Labour Co-op win (new seat)			

=== Wroughton & Wichelstowe ===
Wroughton and Wichelstowe (3 seats)
Party	Candidate	Votes	%	±%
Conservative	Matty Courtliff*	1,234	34.7	–3.8
Liberal Democrats	Martin Barrett	1,203	33.9	+3.3
Conservative	Gayle Cook*	1,107	31.2	–7.3
Liberal Democrats	Stan Pajak	1,085	30.5	–0.1
Conservative	Matthew Smith	1,046	29.4	–9.1
Liberal Democrats	Ela Maksudova	876	24.7	–5.9
Reform	Thomas Marshall	872	24.5	N/A
Reform	Ben Michalek	808	22.7	N/A
Reform	Geoff Thompson	794	22.3	N/A
Green	Robbie Easter	403	11.3	–3.9
Green	Artemis Pink	359	10.1	–5.1
Labour	Sam James	349	9.8	–5.9
Labour	Peter Kramer	290	8.2	–7.5
Labour	Victor Onyia	232	6.5	–9.2
Turnout		3,748	49.1	+14.2
Registered electors		7,635		
Conservative hold				
Liberal Democrats hold				
Conservative hold				
