= List of electoral divisions and wards in Wiltshire =

This is a list of electoral divisions and wards in the ceremonial county of Wiltshire in South West England. All changes since the re-organisation of local government following the passing of the Local Government Act 1972 are shown. The number of councillors elected for each electoral division or ward is shown in brackets.

== Unitary authority councils ==
=== Wiltshire ===
Electoral divisions from 4 June 2009 to 6 May 2021:

1. Aldbourne & Ramsbury (1)
2. Alderbury & Whiteparish (1)
3. Amesbury East (1)
4. Amesbury West (1)
5. Bourne & Woodford Valley (1)
6. Box & Colerne (1)
7. Bradford-on-Avon North (1)
8. Bradford-on-Avon South (1)
9. Brinkworth (1)
10. Bromham, Rowde & Potterne (1)
11. Bulford, Allington & Figheldean (1)
12. Burbage & the Bedwyns (1)
13. By Brook (1)
14. Calne Central (1)
15. Calne Chilvester & Abberd (1)
16. Calne North (1)
17. Calne Rural (1)
18. Calne South & Cherhill (1)
19. Chippenham Cepen Park & Derriads (1)
20. Chippenham Cepen Park & Redlands (1)
21. Chippenham Hardenhuish (1)
22. Chippenham Hardens & England (1)
23. Chippenham Lowden & Rowden (1)
24. Chippenham Monkton (1)
25. Chippenham Pewsham (1)
26. Chippenham Queens & Sheldon (1)
27. Corsham Pickwick (1)
28. Corsham Town (1)
29. Corsham Without & Box Hill (1)
30. Cricklade & Latton (1)
31. Devizes & Roundway South (1)
32. Devizes East (1)
33. Devizes North (1)
34. Downton & Ebble Valley (1)
35. Durrington & Larkhill (1)
36. Ethandune (1)
37. Fovant & Chalke Valley (1)
38. Hilperton (1)
39. Holt & Staverton (1)
40. Kington (1)
41. Laverstock, Ford & Old Sarum (1)
42. Ludgershall & Perham Down (1)
43. Lyneham (1)
44. Malmesbury (1)
45. Marlborough East (1)
46. Marlborough West (1)
47. Melksham Central (1)
48. Melksham North (1)
49. Melksham South (1)
50. Melksham Without North (1)
51. Melksham Without South (1)
52. Mere (1)
53. Minety (1)
54. Nadder & East Knoyle (1)
55. Pewsey (1)
56. Pewsey Vale (1)
57. Purton (1)
58. Redlynch & Landford (1)
59. Roundway (1)
60. Salisbury Bemerton (1)
61. Salisbury Fisherton & Bemerton Village (1)
62. Salisbury Harnham (1)
63. Salisbury St Edmund & Milford (1)
64. Salisbury St Francis & Stratford (1)
65. Salisbury St Mark’s & Bishopdown (1)
66. Salisbury St Martin’s & Cathedral (1)
67. Salisbury St Paul’s (1)
68. Sherston (1)
69. Southwick (1)
70. Summerham & Seend (1)
71. The Collingbournes & Netheravon (1)
72. The Lavingtons & Erlestoke (1)
73. Tidworth (1)
74. Till & Wylye Valley (1)
75. Tisbury (1)
76. Trowbridge Adcroft (1)
77. Trowbridge Central (1)
78. Trowbridge Drynham (1)
79. Trowbridge Grove (1)
80. Trowbridge Lambrok (1)
81. Trowbridge Park (1)
82. Trowbridge Paxcroft (1)
83. Urchfont & The Cannings (1)
84. Warminster Broadway (1)
85. Warminster Copheap & Wylye (1)
86. Warminster East (1)
87. Warminster West (1)
88. Warminster Without (1)
89. West Selkley (1)
90. Westbury East (1)
91. Westbury North (1)
92. Westbury West (1)
93. Wilton & Lower Wylye Valley (1)
94. Winsley & Westwood (1)
95. Winterslow (1)
96. Wootton Bassett East (1); renamed Royal Wootton Bassett East in 2013
97. Wootton Bassett North (1); renamed Royal Wootton Bassett North in 2013
98. Wootton Bassett South (1); renamed Royal Wootton Bassett South in 2013

Electoral divisions from 6 May 2021 to present:

1. Aldbourne & Ramsbury (1)
2. Alderbury & Whiteparish (1)
3. Amesbury East & Bulford (1)
4. Amesbury South (1)
5. Amesbury West (1)
6. Avon Valley (1)
7. Bowerhill (1)
8. Box & Colerne (1)
9. Bradford-on-Avon North (1)
10. Bradford-on-Avon South (1)
11. Brinkworth (1)
12. Bromham, Rowde & Roundway (1)
13. By Brook (1)
14. Calne Central (1)
15. Calne Chilvester & Abberd (1)
16. Calne North (1)
17. Calne Rural (1)
18. Calne South (1)
19. Chippenham Cepen Park & Derriads (1)
20. Chippenham Cepen Park & Hunters Moon (1)
21. Chippenham Hardenhuish (1)
22. Chippenham Hardens & Central (1)
23. Chippenham Lowden & Rowden (1)
24. Chippenham Monkton (1)
25. Chippenham Pewsham (1)
26. Chippenham Sheldon (1)
27. Corsham Ladbrook (1)
28. Corsham Pickwick (1)
29. Corsham Without (1)
30. Cricklade & Latton (1)
31. Devizes East (1)
32. Devizes North (1)
33. Devizes Rural West (1)
34. Devizes South (1)
35. Downton & Ebble Valley (1)
36. Durrington (1)
37. Ethandune (1)
38. Fovant & Chalke Valley (1)
39. Hilperton (1)
40. Holt & Staverton (1)
41. Kington (1)
42. Laverstock (1)
43. Ludgershall North & Rural (1)
44. Lyneham (1)
45. Malmesbury (1)
46. Marlborough East (1)
47. Marlborough West (1)
48. Melksham East (1)
49. Melksham Forest (1)
50. Melksham South (1)
51. Melksham Without North & Shurnhold (1)
52. Melksham Without West & Rural (1)
53. Mere (1)
54. Minety (1)
55. Nadder Valley (1)
56. Old Sarum & Lower Bourne Valley (1)
57. Pewsey (1)
58. Pewsey Vale East (1)
59. Pewsey Vale West (1)
60. Purton (1)
61. Redlynch & Landford (1)
62. Royal Wootton Bassett East (1)
63. Royal Wootton Bassett North (1)
64. Royal Wootton Bassett South & West (1)
65. Salisbury Bemerton Heath (1)
66. Salisbury Fisherton & Bemerton Village (1)
67. Salisbury Harnham East (1)
68. Salisbury Harnham West (1)
69. Salisbury Milford (1)
70. Salisbury St Edmund's (1)
71. Salisbury St Francis & Stratford (1)
72. Salisbury St Paul’s (1)
73. Sherston (1)
74. Southwick (1)
75. The Lavingtons (1)
76. Tidworth East & Ludgershall South (1)
77. Tidworth North & West (1)
78. Till Valley (1)
79. Tisbury (1)
80. Trowbridge Adcroft (1)
81. Trowbridge Central (1)
82. Trowbridge Drynham (1)
83. Trowbridge Grove (1)
84. Trowbridge Lambrok (1)
85. Trowbridge Park (1)
86. Trowbridge Paxcroft (1)
87. Urchfont & Bishops Cannings (1)
88. Warminster Broadway (1)
89. Warminster East (1)
90. Warminster North & Rural (1)
91. Warminster West (1)
92. Westbury East (1)
93. Westbury North (1)
94. Westbury West (1)
95. Wilton (1)
96. Winsley & Westwood (1)
97. Winterslow & Upper Bourne Valley (1)
98. Wylye Valley (1)

=== Swindon ===
Wards of the new Borough of Swindon unitary authority, created in 1997, from 4 May 2000 to 3 May 2012:

1. Abbey Meads (3)
2. Blunsdon (1)
3. Central (3)
4. Covingham & Nythe (3)
5. Dorcan (3)
6. Eastcott (3)
7. Freshbrook & Grange Park (3)
8. Gorse Hill & Pinehurst (3)
9. Haydon Wick (3)
10. Highworth (3)
11. Moredon (3)
12. Old Town & Lawn (3)
13. Parks (3)
14. Penhill (2)
15. Ridgeway (1)
16. St Philip (3)
17. St Margaret (3)
18. Shaw & Nine Elms (3)
19. Toothill & Westlea (2)
20. Walcot (2)
21. Western (3)
22. Wroughton & Chiseldon (3)

Wards from 3 May 2012 to 6 May 2026:

1. Blunsdon & Highworth (3) †
2. Central (3)
3. Chiseldon & Lawn (2)
4. Covingham & Dorcan (3)
5. Eastcott (3)
6. Gorse Hill & Pinehurst (3)
7. Haydon Wick (3) †
8. Liden, Eldene & Park South (3)
9. Lydiard & Freshbrook (3)
10. Mannington & Western (3)
11. Old Town (3)
12. Penhill & Upper Stratton (3) †
13. Priory Vale (3)
14. Ridgeway (1)
15. Rodbourne Cheney (3)
16. Shaw (3)
17. St Andrews (3)
18. St Margaret & South Marston (3)
19. Walcot & Park North (3)
20. Wroughton & Wichelstowe (3)

Wards from 7 May 2026 to present:

1. Badbury Park, Eldene & Liden (3)
2. Blunsdon (1)
3. Broadgreen (2)
4. Chiseldon & Ridgeway (2)
5. Covingham & Nythe (2)
6. Gorse Hill (1)
7. Haydon Wick (3)
8. Highworth (2)
9. Kingshill (2)
10. Lower Stratton (3)
11. Lydiard, Freshbrook & Toothill (3)
12. Old Town & Lawn (3)
13. Parks (2)
14. Penhill & Pinehurst (2)
15. Priory Vale (3)
16. Queen’s Park (3)
17. Rodbourne Cheney (2)
18. Rodbourne Ferndale & Western (3)
19. Shaw & Westlea (3)
20. South Marston (1)
21. St Andrews East (2)
22. St Andrews West & Tadpole (2)
23. Upper Stratton (2)
24. Walcot (2)
25. Wroughton & Wichelstowe (3)

† minor boundary changes in 2015

== Former county council ==
=== Wiltshire ===
Electoral Divisions of Wiltshire County Council from 1 April 1974 (first election 12 April 1973) to 7 May 1981:

1. Amesbury No. 1 (2)
2. Amesbury No. 2 (1)
3. Amesbury No. 3 (1)
4. Bedwyn (1)
5. Box (1)
6. Bradford (1)
7. Bradford & Melksham No. 1 (1)
8. Bradford & Melksham No. 2 (1)
9. Bremhill (1)
10. Brinkworth (1)
11. Calne North (1)
12. Calne South (1)
13. Cannings (1)
14. Chippenham (Park) (1)
15. Chippenham (Sheldon) (1)
16. Chippenham (Town) (1)
17. Collingbourne (1)
18. Corsham (1)
19. Cricklade (1)
20. Devizes No. 1 (East) (1)
21. Devizes No. 2 (1)
22. Downton (1)
23. Enford (1)
24. Fisherton (1)
25. Highworth No. 1 (3)
26. Highworth No. 2 (1)
27. Highworth No. 3 (1)
28. Highworth No. 4 (1)
29. Highworth No. 5 (1)
30. Kington (1)
31. Langley (1)
32. Lavington (1)
33. Malmesbury (1)
34. Marlborough (1)
35. Melksham (2)
36. Mere & Tisbury No. 1 (Donhead & Tisbury) (1)
37. Mere & Tisbury No. 2 (Mere) (1)
38. New Sarum (Bemerton) (1)
39. New Sarum (Fisherton) (1)
40. New Sarum (St Edmund) (1)
41. New Sarum (St Mark) (1)
42. New Sarum (St Paul) (1)
43. New Sarum (St Thomas) (1)
44. Pewsey (1)
45. Potterne (1)
46. Preshute (1)
47. Purton (1)
48. Sherston (1)
49. Swindon (East) (2)
50. Swindon (Kings) (1)
51. Swindon (North) (3)
52. Swindon (Queens) (1)
53. Swindon (South No. 1) (2)
54. Swindon (South No. 2) (2)
55. Swindon (West) (3) †
56. Trowbridge No. 1 (1)
57. Trowbridge No. 2 (1)
58. Trowbridge No. 3 (1)
59. Warminster (2)
60. Warminster & Westbury No. 1 (1)
61. Warminster & Westbury No. 2 (1)
62. Warminster & Westbury No. 3 (1)
63. Westbury (1)
64. Whiteparish (1)
65. Wilton (1)
66. Wootton Bassett (1)
67. Wylye (1)

† minor boundary changes in 1980

Electoral Divisions from 7 May 1981 to 6 May 1993:

1. Aldbourne & Ramsbury (1)
2. Alderbury (1)
3. Amesbury (1)
4. Bedwyn (1)
5. Blunsdon (1)
6. Box (1)
7. Bradford-on-Avon North (1)
8. Bradford-on-Avon South (1)
9. Bremhill & Calne Without (1)
10. Brinkworth (1)
11. Calne (1)
12. Chippenham Park (1)
13. Chippenham Sheldon (1)
14. Chippenham Town (1)
15. Collingbourne (1)
16. Corsham (1)
17. Cricklade (1)
18. Devizes (1)
19. Devizes South & Cannings (1)
20. Downton (1)
21. Durrington & Bulford (1)
22. Highworth (1)
23. Holt (1)
24. Idmiston (1)
25. Kington (1)
26. Laverstock (1)
27. Lavington (1)
28. Malmesbury (1)
29. Marlborough (1)
30. Melksham (1)
31. Melksham Without (1)
32. Mere (1)
33. Pewsey & Enford (1)
34. Pewsham (1)
35. Potterne (1)
36. Purton (1)
37. Salisbury Bemerton (1)
38. Salisbury Harnham (1)
39. Salisbury St Mark (1)
40. Salisbury St Martin (1)
41. Salisbury St Paul (1)
42. Shrewton (1)
43. Southwick (1)
44. Strat St Marg Coleview (1)
45. Strat St Marg St Margaret (1)
46. Strat St Marg St Phillip (1)
47. Swindon Central (1)
48. Swindon Eastcott (1)
49. Swindon Eldene (1)
50. Swindon Gorse Hill (1)
51. Swindon Lawns (1)
52. Swindon Liden (1)
53. Swindon Moredon (1)
54. Swindon Park North (1)
55. Swindon Park South (1)
56. Swindon South (1)
57. Swindon Toothill (1)
58. Swindon Walcot (1)
59. Swindon Western (1)
60. Swindon Whitworth (1)
61. Tisbury (1)
62. Trowbridge East (1)
63. Trowbridge South (1)
64. Trowbridge West (1)
65. Upper Wylye Valley (1)
66. Wanborough (1)
67. Warminster East (1)
68. Warminster West (1)
69. Westbury (1)
70. Whorwellsdown (1)
71. Wilton (1)
72. Wooton Bassett North (1)
73. Wootton Bassett South (1)
74. Wroughton (1)
75. Swindon Freshbrook (1); new electoral division added in 1985

Electoral Divisions from 6 May 1993 to 5 May 2005:

1. Aldbourne & Ramsbury (1)
2. Alderbury (1)
3. Amesbury (1)
4. Avon & Cannings (1)
5. Bedwyn & Pewsey (1)
6. Bourne Valley (1)
7. Bradford-on-Avon (1)
8. Bremhill & Calne Without (1)
9. Calne (1)
10. Chippenham Park (1)
11. Chippenham Sheldon (1)
12. Chippenham Town (1)
13. Collingbourne (1)
14. Corsham (1)
15. Cricklade & Purton (1)
16. Devizes (1)
17. Devizes South & Bromham (1)
18. Downton (1)
19. Durrington (1)
20. Haydon Wick (1); electoral division abolished in 1998
21. Highworth (1); electoral division abolished in 1998
22. Holt (1)
23. Kington (1)
24. Lavington (1)
25. Malmesbury (1)
26. Marlborough (1)
27. Melksham (1)
28. Melksham Without (1)
29. Mere (1)
30. Minety (1)
31. Pickwick with Box (1)
32. Salisbury Bemerton (1)
33. Salisbury Harnham (1)
34. Salisbury St Mark (1)
35. Salisbury St Martin (1)
36. Southwick (1)
37. St Paul (1)
38. Stratton St Margaret, Coleview & Nythe (1); electoral division abolished in 1998
39. Stratton St Margaret, St Margaret (1); electoral division abolished in 1998
40. Stratton St Margaret, St Philip (1); electoral division abolished in 1998
41. Swindon Central (1); electoral division abolished in 1998
42. Swindon Covingham (1); electoral division abolished in 1998
43. Swindon Dorcan South (1); electoral division abolished in 1998
44. Swindon Eastcott (1); electoral division abolished in 1998
45. Swindon Freshbrook (1); electoral division abolished in 1998
46. Swindon Gorse Hill (1); electoral division abolished in 1998
47. Swindon Lawns (1); electoral division abolished in 1998
48. Swindon Moredon (1); electoral division abolished in 1998
49. Swindon Parks (1); electoral division abolished in 1998
50. Swindon Roughmoor (1); electoral division abolished in 1998
51. Swindon Toothill (1); electoral division abolished in 1998
52. Swindon Walcot (1); electoral division abolished in 1998
53. Swindon Western (1); electoral division abolished in 1998
54. Swindon Whitworth (1); electoral division abolished in 1998
55. Tisbury (1)
56. Trowbridge East (1)
57. Trowbridge South (1)
58. Trowbridge West (1)
59. Upper Wylye Valley (1)
60. Wanborough (1); electoral division abolished in 1998
61. Warminster East (1)
62. Warminster West (1)
63. Westbury (1)
64. Whorwellsdown (1)
65. Wilton & Wylye (1)
66. Wootton Bassett North (1)
67. Wootton Bassett South (1)
68. Wroughton (1); electoral division abolished in 1998

Electoral Divisions from 5 May 2005 to 4 June 2009:

1. Aldbourne & Ramsbury (1)
2. Alderbury (1)
3. Amesbury (1)
4. Avon & Pewsey (1)
5. Bedwyn & Collingbourne (1)
6. Bourne & Woodford Valley (1)
7. Box, Colerne & Lacock (1)
8. Bradford-on-Avon (1)
9. Bromham & Potterne (1)
10. Calne & Without (1)
11. Calne (1)
12. Central (1)
13. Chalke & Nadder (1)
14. Chippenham North (1)
15. Chippenham Pewsham (1)
16. Chippenham West (1)
17. Corsham (1)
18. Cricklade & Purton (1)
19. Devizes North (1)
20. Devizes South (1)
21. Downton & Ebble Valley (1)
22. Durrington & Bulford (1)
23. Holt & Paxcroft (1)
24. Kington (1)
25. Lavington & Cannings (1)
26. Malmesbury (1)
27. Manor Vale (1)
28. Marlborough (1)
29. Melksham & Without (1)
30. Melksham Central (1)
31. Mere & Tisbury (1)
32. Minety (1)
33. Salisbury East (2)
34. Salisbury South (2)
35. Salisbury West (1)
36. Tidworth & Ludgershall
37. Trowbridge East (2)
38. Trowbridge West (1)
39. Warminster East & Wylye (1)
40. Warminster West (1)
41. Westbury Ham & Dilton (1)
42. Westbury Laverton & Shearwater (1)
43. Whorwellsdown Hundred (1)
44. Wilton & Wylye (1)
45. Wootton Bassett North (1)
46. Wootton Bassett South (1)

== Former district councils ==
=== Kennet ===
Wards from 1 April 1974 (first election 7 June 1973) to 6 May 1976:

Wards from 6 May 1976 to 1 May 2003:

Wards from 1 May 2003 to 1 April 2009 (district abolished):

1. Aldbourne (1)
2. All Cannings (1)
3. Bedwyn (1)
4. Bishops Cannings (1)
5. Bromham & Rowde (2)
6. Burbage (1)
7. Cheverell (1)
8. Collingbourne (1)
9. Devizes East (3)
10. Devizes North (2)
11. Devizes South (2)
12. Lavingtons (2)
13. Ludgershall (2)
14. Marlborough East (2)
15. Marlborough West (2)
16. Milton Lilbourne (1)
17. Netheravon (1)
18. Ogbourne (1)
19. Pewsey (2)
20. Pewsey Vale (1)
21. Potterne (1)
22. Ramsbury (2)
23. Roundway (2)
24. Seend (1)
25. Shalbourne (1)
26. Tidworth, Perham Down & Ludgershall South (3)
27. Upavon (1)
28. Urchfont (1)
29. West Selkley (1)

=== North Wiltshire ===
Wards from 1 April 1974 (first election 7 June 1973) to 5 May 1983:

Wards from 5 May 1983 to 1 May 2003:

Wards from 1 May 2003 to 3 May 2007:

1. Ashton Keynes & Minety (2)
2. Box (2)
3. Bremhill (1)
4. Brinkworth & The Somerfords (2)
5. Calne Abberd (1)
6. Calne Chilvester (1)
7. Calne Lickhill (1)
8. Calne Marden (1)
9. Calne Priestley (1)
10. Calne Quemerford (1)
11. Calne Without (1)
12. Cepen Park (2)
13. Chippenham Allington (1)
14. Chippenham Audley (1)
15. Chippenham Avon (1)
16. Chippenham Hill Rise (1)
17. Chippenham London Road (1)
18. Chippenham Monkton Park (1)
19. Chippenham Park (1)
20. Chippenham Pewsham (2)
21. Chippenham Redland (1)
22. Chippenham Westcroft/Queens (1)
23. Colerne (1)
24. Corsham (2)
25. Cricklade (2)
26. Hilmarton (1)
27. Kington Langley (1)
28. Kingston St Michael (1)
29. Lacock with Neston & Gastard (1)
30. Lyneham (2)
31. Malmesbury (2)
32. Nettleton (1)
33. Pickwick (2)
34. Purton (2)
35. St Paul Malmesbury Without & Sherston (2)
36. The Lydiards & Broad Town (1)
37. Wootton Bassett North (2)
38. Wootton Bassett South (3)

Wards from 3 May 2007 to 1 April 2009 (district abolished):

1. Box & Rudloe (2)
2. Bremhill (1)
3. Brinkworth (2)
4. Calne Abberd (1)
5. Calne Chilvester (1)
6. Calne Lickhill (2)
7. Calne Marden (1)
8. Calne Priestley (1)
9. Calne Quemerford (1)
10. Calne Without (1)
11. Chippenham Allington (2)
12. Chippenham Avon (2)
13. Chippenham Hill Rise (1)
14. Chippenham London Road (1)
15. Chippenham Monkton Park (1)
16. Chippenham Park (2)
17. Chippenham Pewsham (2)
18. Chippenham Redland (2)
19. Chippenham Westcroft/Queens (1)
20. Colerne (1)
21. Corsham & Lacock (3)
22. Cricklade (2)
23. Hullavington & Crudwell (1)
24. Kington Langley (1)
25. Lyneham (2)
26. Malmesbury (2)
27. Minety & Purton (3)
28. Pickwick (2)
29. Sherston (1)
30. St Paul Malmesbury Without (1)
31. Sutton Benger (1)
32. The Lydiards & Broad Town (1)
33. Wootton Bassett North (2)
34. Wootton Bassett South (3)
35. Yatton Keynell (1)

=== Salisbury ===
Wards from 1 April 1974 (first election 7 June 1973) to 6 May 1976:

Wards from 6 May 1976 to 1 May 2003:

Wards from 1 May 2003 to 1 April 2009 (district abolished):

1. Alderbury & Whiteparish (3)
2. Amesbury East (3)
3. Amesbury West (1)
4. Bemerton (3)
5. Bishopdown (2)
6. Bulford (2)
7. Chalke Valley (1)
8. Donhead (1)
9. Downton & Redlynch (3)
10. Durrington (3)
11. Ebble (1)
12. Fisherton & Bemerton Village (2)
13. Fonthill & Nadder (1)
14. Harnham East (2)
15. Harnham West (2)
16. Knoyle (1)
17. Laverstock (2)
18. Lower Wylye & Woodford Valley (1)
19. St Edmund & Milford (2)
20. St Mark & Stratford (3)
21. St Martin & Milford (2)
22. St Paul (2)
23. Till Valley & Wylye (2)
24. Tisbury & Fovant (2)
25. Upper Bourne, Idmiston & Winterbourne (2)
26. Western & Mere (2)
27. Wilton (2)
28. Winterslow (2)

=== Thamesdown ===
Wards from 1 April 1974 (first election 7 June 1973) to 6 May 1976:

Wards from 6 May 1976 to 4 May 2000:

1. Toothill (3); new ward added in 1980

In 1997 the district was converted into the unitary authority of Swindon.

=== West Wiltshire ===
Wards from 1 April 1974 (first election 7 June 1973) to 5 May 1983:

Wards from 5 May 1983 to 1 May 2003:

Wards from 1 May 2003 to 3 May 2007:

1. Atworth & Whitley (1)
2. Bradford-on-Avon North (2)
3. Bradford-on-Avon South (2)
4. Dilton Marsh (2)
5. Ethandune (1)
6. Holt (1)
7. Manor Vale (2)
8. Melksham North (2)
9. Melksham Spa (2)
10. Melksham Without (2)
11. Melksham Woodrow (1)
12. Mid Wylye Valley (1)
13. Paxcroft (2)
14. Shearwater (1)
15. Southwick & Wingfield (1)
16. Summerham (1)
17. Trowbridge Adcroft (2)
18. Trowbridge College (2)
19. Trowbridge Drynham (2)
20. Trowbridge John of Gaunt (2)
21. Trowbridge Park (2)
22. Warminster East (3)
23. Warminster West (3)
24. Westbury Ham (2)
25. Westbury Laverton (2)

Wards from 3 May 2007 to 1 April 2009 (district abolished):

1. Atworth, Whitley & South Wraxall (1)
2. Avonside (3)
3. Bradford-on-Avon North (2)
4. Bradford-on-Avon South (2)
5. Dilton (1)
6. Ethandune (1)
7. Manor Vale (1)
8. Melksham East (2)
9. Melksham Spa (2)
10. Melksham Without (3)
11. Mid Wylye Valley (1)
12. Shearwater (1)
13. Summerham (1)
14. Trowbridge & North Bradley (1)
15. Trowbridge & Southwick (1)
16. Trowbridge Central (2)
17. Trowbridge East (3)
18. Trowbridge North East (2)
19. Trowbridge North West (1)
20. Trowbridge South West (2)
21. Warminster East (3)
22. Warminster West (3)
23. Westbury Ham (3)
24. Westbury Laverton (2)

== Electoral wards by constituency ==
Wards in Swindon are as they existed on 1 December 2020. Divisions in Wiltshire are as they existed on 4 May 2021.

=== Chippenham ===
Wiltshire: Calne Central; Calne Chilvester & Abberd; Calne North; Calne Rural; Chippenham Cepen Park & Derriads; Chippenham Cepen Park & Hunters Moon; Chippenham Hardenhuish; Chippenham Hardens & Central; Chippenham Lowden & Rowden; Chippenham Monkton; Chippenham Pewsham; Chippenham Sheldon; Corsham Ladbrook; Corsham Pickwick; Corsham Without; Lyneham; Royal Wootton Bassett East; Royal Wootton Bassett North; Royal Wootton Bassett South & West.

=== East Wiltshire ===
Swindon: Chiseldon & Lawn (polling district CLB); Ridgeway; Wroughton and Wichelstowe.

Wiltshire: Aldbourne & Ramsbury; Amesbury East & Bulford; Amesbury South; Amesbury West; Avon Valley; Durrington; Ludgershall North & Rural; Marlborough East; Marlborough West; Pewsey; Pewsey Vale East; Pewsey Vale West; Tidworth East & Ludgershall South; Tidworth North & West; Till Valley.

=== Melksham and Devizes ===
Wiltshire: Bowerhill; Box & Colerne; Bradford-on-Avon North; Bradford-on-Avon South; Bromham, Rowde & Roundway; Calne South; Devizes East; Devizes North; Devizes Rural West; Devizes South; Holt; Melksham East; Melksham Forest; Melksham South; Melksham Without North & Shurnhold; Melksham Without West & Rural; The Lavingtons; Urchfont & Bishops Cannings; Winsley & Westwood.

=== Salisbury ===
Wiltshire: Alderbury & Whiteparish; Downton & Ebble Valley; Fovant & Chalke Valley; Laverstock; Nadder Valley; Old Sarum & Lower Bourne Valley; Redlynch & Landford; Salisbury Bemerton Heath; Salisbury Fisherton & Bemerton Village; Salisbury Harnham East; Salisbury Harnham West; Salisbury Milford; Salisbury St Edmund’s; Salisbury St Francis & Stratford; Salisbury St Paul’s; Tisbury; Wilton; Winterslow & Upper Bourne Valley.

=== South Cotswolds (part) ===
Wiltshire: Brinkworth; By Brook; Cricklade & Latton; Kington; Malmesbury; Minety; Purton; Sherston.

=== South West Wiltshire ===
Wiltshire: Ethandune; Hilperton; Mere; Southwick; Trowbridge Adcroft; Trowbridge Central; Trowbridge Drynham; Trowbridge Grove; Trowbridge Lambrok; Trowbridge Park; Trowbridge Paxcroft; Warminster Broadway; Warminster East; Warminster North & Rural; Warminster West; Westbury East; Westbury North; Westbury West; Wylye Valley.

=== Swindon North ===
Swindon: Blunsdon & Highworth; Gorse Hill & Pinehurst; Haydon Wick; Penhill & Upper Stratton; Priory Vale; Rodbourne Cheney; St. Andrews; St. Margaret & South Marston.

=== Swindon South ===
Swindon: Central; Chiseldon & Lawn (polling districts CLA, CLC & CLD); Covingham & Dorcan; Eastcott; Liden, Eldene & Park South; Lydiard & Freshbrook; Mannington & Western; Old Town; Shaw; Walcot & Park North.

== Area boards ==
Wiltshire Council operates 18 area boards which assist with local decision-making and provide grants for community projects.

1. Bradford-on-Avon Area Board
2. Calne Area Board
3. Chippenham and Villages Area Board
4. Corsham Area Board
5. Devizes Area Board
6. Malmesbury Area Board
7. Marlborough Area Board
8. Melksham Area Board
9. Pewsey Area Board
10. Royal Wootton Bassett and Cricklade Area Board
11. Salisbury Area Board
12. Southern Wiltshire Area Board
13. South West Wiltshire Area Board
14. Stonehenge Area Board
15. Tidworth Area Board
16. Trowbridge Area Board
17. Warminster Area Board
18. Westbury Area Board

== See also ==
- List of parliamentary constituencies in Wiltshire
