= Gorse Hill and Pinehurst (ward) =

Ward in Swindon, Wiltshire

Gorse Hill and Pinehurst is an electoral ward in the Borough of Swindon, England. Since 2000, the ward has elected three councillors to Swindon Borough Council.

== History ==
The ward was created in 2000.

== Geography ==
The ward covers the areas of Gorse Hill and Pinehurst. The ward is part of the Swindon North parliamentary constituency.

== Demographics ==
In the 2021 census, the population of the ward was 14,018.

The ward is one of the smallest in Swindon, but one of the most densely populated. It also suffers among the highest rates of deprivation in Swindon and South West England.

== See also ==
- List of electoral divisions and wards in Wiltshire
