= Eastcott (ward) =

Ward in Swindon, Wiltshire

Eastcott is an electoral ward in the Borough of Swindon, England. Since 2012, the ward has elected three councillors to Swindon Borough Council.

== History ==
The ward was created in 2000.

Eastcott was represented by Liberal Democrat councillors.

== Geography ==
The ward covers the area of Eastcott. The ward is part of the Swindon South parliamentary constituency.

== Demographics ==
In the 2021 census, the population of the ward was 12,024.

== See also ==
- List of electoral divisions and wards in Wiltshire
