= Mannington and Western (ward) =

Ward in Swindon, Wiltshire

Mannington and Western is an electoral ward in the Borough of Swindon, England. Since 2012, the ward has elected three councillors to Swindon Borough Council.

== History ==
The ward was created in 2012.

== Geography ==
The ward covers the areas of Toothill and part of Westlea. The ward is part of the Swindon South parliamentary constituency.

== Demographics ==
In the 2021 census, the population of the ward was 11,193.

== See also ==
- List of electoral divisions and wards in Wiltshire
