= Swindon South =

UK Parliament constituency (since 1997)

Coordinates: 51.559°N 1.782°W

- Borough constituency for the House of Commons
- Boundary of Swindon South in South West England
- County: Wiltshire
- Electorate: 72,468 (2023)

Current constituency
- Created: 1997
- Member of Parliament: Heidi Alexander (Labour)
- Seats: One
- Created from: Swindon and Devizes

Swindon South is a constituency in the Borough of Swindon, Wiltshire, represented in the House of Commons of the UK Parliament since 2024 by Heidi Alexander of the Labour Party. Alexander had previously been MP for Lewisham East from 2010 to 2018.

In the 2023 review of Westminster constituencies, the seat was renamed from South Swindon to Swindon South, first contested at the 2024 general election.

== Constituency profile ==
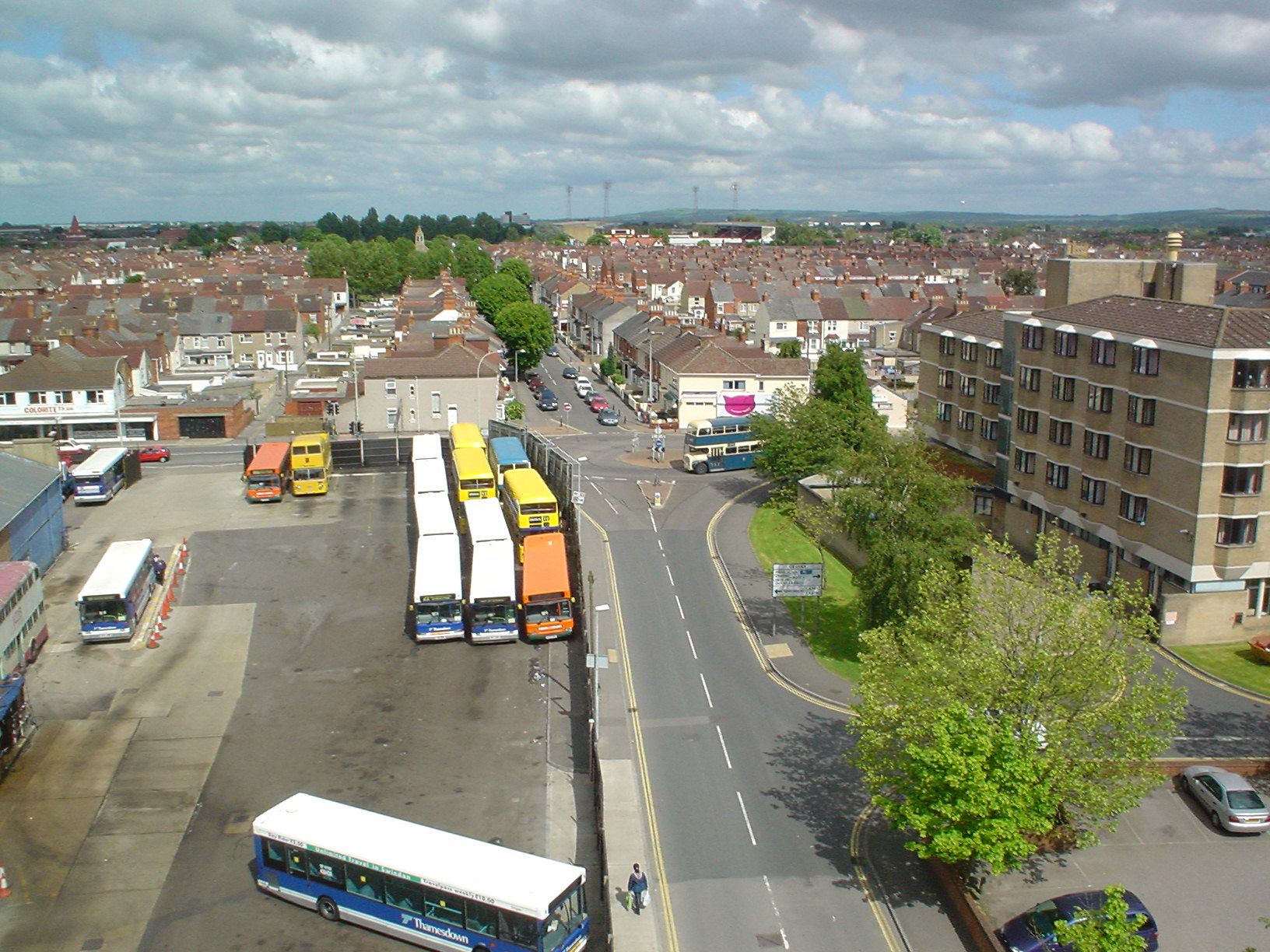
Carfax Street, Swindon

Swindon South is a constituency in Wiltshire in South West England. which covers the central and southern areas of the town of Swindon. It is made up of the parishes of West Swindon (including Freshbrook and Toothill); South Swindon (including Okus, Walcot, Old Town, Lawn, Coate and Wichelstowe); Nythe, Eldene and Liden (including Dorcan); and Covingham, as well as Even Swindon, an area in the south of Central Swindon North parish.

Swindon was a small market town until the arrival of the Great Western Railway in 1843. This transformed the town into an important railway hub and a centre for engineering; Swindon Works was once one of the largest railway engineering complexes in the world. Swindon's location along the M4 corridor has brought technology businesses to the town in recent decades. This constituency contains a variety of neighbourhood types. The town centre has below-average levels of wealth and most residents live in dense flats and terraces. The Walcot area is highly-deprived and was developed as a post-war council estate; many of the properties here are socially rented. The outer suburbs are mostly affluent with low levels of deprivation. House prices across the constituency are generally lower than the regional and UK averages.

Swindon South has a large population of middle-aged adults and a low proportion of retirees. Residents have average levels of income and homeownership and the child poverty rate is in line with the overall UK figure. They generally have low levels of education and a high proportion work in the retail, finance and transport sectors. The percentage of residents claiming unemployment benefits is similar to the UK-wide rate. White people made up 75% of the population at the 2021 census. Asians, mostly of Indian origin, were the largest ethnic minority group at 17% and made up a majority of residents in parts of the town centre.

At Swindon Borough Council, most of this constituency is represented by the Labour Party. Some Reform UK councillors were elected in 2026 in the more deprived areas, and Conservatives were elected in the wealthier suburbs. An estimated 53% of voters in Swindon South supported leaving the European Union in the 2016 referendum, similar to the UK-wide figure of 52%.

== Boundaries ==
Map of boundaries from 2024

1997–2010: The Borough of Thamesdown wards of Central, Chiseldon, Dorcan, Eastcott, Freshbrook, Lawns, Park, Ridgeway, Toothill, Walcot, and Wroughton.

The constituency was created in 1997 from parts of the Swindon and Devizes seats. It covered the southern half of the town as well as farms, villages and hamlets to the immediate south and east of Swindon.

2010–2024: The Borough of Swindon wards of Central, Covingham and Dorcan (part), Eastcott, Liden + Eldene and Park South, Lydiard and Freshbrook, Old Town, Chiseldon and Lawn, Ridgeway, Shaw, Mannington and Western (part), Walcot and Park North, and Wroughton and Wichelstowe.

There were slightly amended boundaries for the 2010 election, which saw it lose South Marston to North Swindon. The boundary ran from Dorcan across to Bishopstone and then down to Russley Park before turning west to Barbury Castle. From there it ran north to the Roughmoor area and looped back down to incorporate West Swindon, before following the railway east through the town and back to Dorcan. Settlements outside the Swindon built-up area include Wroughton, Chiseldon, Wanborough, and Liddington.

2024–present: Further to the 2023 review of Westminster constituencies which came into effect for the 2024 general election, the constituency is composed of the following (as they existed on 1 December 2020):

- The Borough of Swindon wards of: Central; Chiseldon and Lawn (polling districts CLA, CLC and CLD); Covingham and Dorcan; Eastcott; Liden, Eldene and Park South; Lydiard and Freshbrook; Mannington and Western; Old Town; Shaw; Walcot and Park North.

The changes included the transfer of the Covingham and Nythe districts from Swindon North; the adjustment of the boundary around Nythe ensured that the whole of the parish of Nythe, Eldene and Liden falls within the constituency. At the same time, a substantial semi-rural area in the south, namely the Chiseldon and Wroughton districts, was transferred to the new constituency of East Wiltshire; this involved the parishes of Bishopstone, Chiseldon, Liddington, Wanborough and Wroughton.

== History ==
Swindon grew from a village into a railway town, and until the latter part of the 20th century the related works were the primary employer. Today, Swindon is the home of a number of large companies: examples specific to South Swindon include Intel's European headquarters, Nationwide's headquarters and Zurich Financial Services' UK headquarters.

Created in 1997, the Swindon South constituency, swinging in line with the national average in the New Labour landslide, produced a fairly safe majority for the Labour winner. Julia Drown had a majority of more than 5,000 which was extended in 2001 to more than 7,000 but then dropped on a new candidate's selection, to 1,353 in 2005. In 2010, Robert Buckland, a Conservative, gained South Swindon at the general election with a majority of just over 3,500. In 2015, the Conservative majority increased to 5,785; in 2017, the Conservative majority fell to 2,464 on a 3.5% swing to Labour. In 2019, Buckland's majority rose to 6,625 (13%) and 52% of the vote, with a swing of 4.1% to Conservative. These patterns suggest a seat that is more marginal than its neighbour Swindon North, and one which has acted as a bellwether of the national result. Buckland was the Lord Chancellor and Secretary of State for Justice between July 2019 and September 2021, and Secretary of State for Wales from July to October 2022.

At the 2024 election, the result again aligned with the national result: Heidi Alexander won the seat for Labour with a 16% swing. A former Deputy Mayor of London, she has been Secretary of State for Transport since November 2024.

== Members of Parliament ==
Election	Member	Party
1997	Julia Drown	Labour
2005	Anne Snelgrove	Labour
2010	Robert Buckland	Conservative
2024	Heidi Alexander	Labour

== Elections ==
=== Elections in the 2020s ===
General election 2024: Swindon South
Party	Candidate	Votes	%	±%
Labour	Heidi Alexander	21,676	48.4	+8.2
Conservative	Robert Buckland	12,070	26.9	–24.7
Reform	Catherine Kosidowski	6,194	13.8	N/A
Green	Rod Hebden	2,539	5.7	+5.2
Liberal Democrats	Matt McCabe	1,843	4.1	–3.5
Independent	Martin Costello	472	1.1	N/A
Majority		9,606	21.5	N/A
Turnout		44,794	61.7	–6.6
Registered electors		72,596		
Labour gain from Conservative		Swing	▲16.5	

=== Elections in the 2010s ===
2019 notional result
Party	Vote	%
Conservative	25,564	51.6
Labour	19,914	40.2
Liberal Democrats	3,788	7.6
Green	261	0.5
Turnout	49,527	68.3
Electorate	72,468	

General election 2019: South Swindon
Party	Candidate	Votes	%	±%
Conservative	Robert Buckland	26,536	52.3	+3.9
Labour Co-op	Sarah Church	19,911	39.2	–4.3
Liberal Democrats	Stan Pajak	4,299	8.5	+4.4
Majority		6,625	13.1	+8.2
Turnout		50,746	69.4	–1.6
Conservative hold		Swing	+4.1	

General election 2017: South Swindon
Party	Candidate	Votes	%	±%
Conservative	Robert Buckland	24,809	48.4	+2.2
Labour Co-op	Sarah Church	22,345	43.5	+9.0
Liberal Democrats	Stan Pajak	2,079	4.1	+0.4
UKIP	Martin Costello	1,291	2.5	–9.5
Green	Talis Kimberley-Fairbourn	747	1.5	–2.1
Majority		2,464	4.9	–6.8
Turnout		51,358	71.0	+3.4
Conservative hold		Swing	–3.5	

General election 2015: South Swindon
Party	Candidate	Votes	%	±%
Conservative	Robert Buckland	22,777	46.2	+4.4
Labour	Anne Snelgrove	16,992	34.5	+0.2
UKIP	John Short	5,920	12.0	+7.7
Liberal Democrats	Damon Hooton	1,817	3.7	–13.9
Green	Talis Kimberley-Fairbourn	1,757	3.6	+2.3
Majority		5,785	11.7	+4.2
Turnout		49,263	66.6	+1.7
Conservative hold		Swing	+2.1	

General election 2010: South Swindon
Party	Candidate	Votes	%	±%
Conservative	Robert Buckland	19,687	41.8	+4.9
Labour	Anne Snelgrove	16,143	34.3	–6.2
Liberal Democrats	Damon Hooton	8,305	17.6	+0.6
UKIP	Robert Tingley	2,029	4.3	+2.1
Green	Jenni Miles	619	1.3	–1.6
Christian	Alistair Kirk	176	0.4	N/A
Independent	Karsten Evans	160	0.3	N/A
Majority		3,544	7.5	N/A
Turnout		47,119	64.9	+5.9
Conservative gain from Labour		Swing	+5.51	

=== Elections in the 2000s ===
General election 2005: South Swindon
Party	Candidate	Votes	%	±%
Labour	Anne Snelgrove	17,534	40.3	–11.0
Conservative	Robert Buckland	16,181	37.2	+2.8
Liberal Democrats	Sue Stebbing	7,322	16.8	+4.9
Green	Bill Hughes	1,234	2.8	N/A
UKIP	Stephen Halden	955	2.2	+0.6
Independent	Alan Hayward	193	0.4	N/A
Independent	John Williams	53	0.1	N/A
Majority		1,353	3.1	–13.8
Turnout		43,472	60.2	–0.8
Labour hold		Swing	–6.9	

General election 2001: South Swindon
Party	Candidate	Votes	%	±%
Labour	Julia Drown	22,260	51.3	+4.5
Conservative	Simon Coombs	14,919	34.4	–1.4
Liberal Democrats	Geoff Brewer	5,165	11.9	–2.5
UKIP	Vicki Sharp	713	1.6	N/A
Rock 'n' Roll Loony	Roly Gillard	327	0.8	N/A
Majority		7,341	16.9	+5.9
Turnout		43,384	61.0	–11.9
Labour hold		Swing		

=== Elections in the 1990s ===
General election 1997: South Swindon
Party	Candidate	Votes	%	±%
Labour	Julia Drown	23,943	46.8	
Conservative	Simon Coombs	18,298	35.8	
Liberal Democrats	Stanley Pajak	7,371	14.4	
Referendum	David McIntosh	1,273	2.5	
Independent	Richard Charman	181	0.2	
Natural Law	Keith Buscombe	96	0.2	
Majority		5,645	11.0	
Turnout		51,162	72.9	
Labour win (new seat)				

== See also ==
- Parliamentary constituencies in Wiltshire
