= Ridgeway (Swindon ward) =

Ward in Swindon, Wiltshire

Coordinates: 51°32′47.3″N 1°39′50.7″W

Ridgeway is an electoral ward in the Borough of Swindon, England. Since 2000, the ward has elected one councillor to Swindon Borough Council.

== History ==
The ward was created in 2000.

== Geography ==
The ward covers the area of Ridgeway View. The ward is part of the East Wiltshire parliamentary constituency.

== Demographics ==
In the 2021 census, the population of the ward was 3,423.

== See also ==
- List of electoral divisions and wards in Wiltshire
