= Liden, Eldene and Park South (ward) =

Ward in Swindon, Wiltshire

Liden, Eldene and Park South is an electoral ward in the Borough of Swindon, England. Since 2012, the ward has elected three councillors to Swindon Borough Council.

== History ==
The ward was created in 2012.

== Geography ==
The ward covers an urban suburban area. The ward is part of the Swindon South parliamentary constituency.

== Demographics ==
In the 2021 census, the population of the ward was 11,425.

== See also ==
- List of electoral divisions and wards in Wiltshire
