= The Dorcan Academy =

Location
- St Paul's Drive; Covingham; Swindon, Wiltshire, SN3 5DA; England; 51°33′37″N 1°43′49″W

Information
- Type: Academy
- Motto: Aspire to greatness
- Established: 1970
- Local authority: None
- Department for Education URN: 137684 Tables
- Ofsted: Reports
- Head teacher: Lee Morgans
- Gender: Mixed
- Age: 11 to 16
- Enrolment: 797 (November 2023)
- Houses: Falcon, Eagle, Kingfisher, and Osprey
- Colours: Royal blue, blue, red, yellow, and silver
- Former name: Dorcan Technology College
- Website: www.dorcan.co.uk

The Dorcan Academy, in Dorcan, Swindon, Wiltshire, is a co-educational secondary school that caters to students aged 11 to 16.

The curriculum is structured into three pathways: Foundation, Central, and Extended. Students can work towards the English Baccalaureate (EBacc) suite of qualifications at GCSE.

The school was rated 'Good' by Ofsted in July 2022.

== History ==
Dorcan Comprehensive School was built in the 1970s. The school became a specialist technology college in 1999, known as Dorcan Technology College. In December 2011, the school converted to an academy.
