= Haydon Wick (ward) =

Ward in Swindon, Wiltshire

Haydon Wick is an electoral ward in the Borough of Swindon, England. Since 2000, the ward has elected three councillors to Swindon Borough Council.

== History ==
The ward was created in 2000. Haydon Wick Parish Council has 18 Councillors

== Geography ==
The ward covers the areas of Haydon Wick. The ward is part of the Swindon North parliamentary constituency.

== Demographics ==
In the 2021 census, the population of the ward was 12,045.

== See also ==
- List of electoral divisions and wards in Wiltshire
