= Rodbourne Cheney (ward) =

Ward in Swindon, Wiltshire

Rodbourne Cheney is an electoral ward in the Borough of Swindon, England. Since 2012, the ward has elected three councillors to Swindon Borough Council.

== History ==
The ward was created in 2012.

In 2024, the Conservatives won a by-election in the ward.

== Geography ==
The ward covers the area of Rodbourne Cheney. The ward is part of the Swindon North parliamentary constituency.

== Demographics ==
In the 2021 census, the population of the ward was 12,701.

== See also ==
- List of electoral divisions and wards in Wiltshire
