= Dorcan =

Area of Swindon, Wiltshire, England

Dorcan is an area in the east of Swindon, Wiltshire, England, close to the A419 (51.56°N 01.73°W).

The population of the Dorcan electoral ward taken at the 2011 census was 8,684.

Dorcan takes its name from the nearby Dorkerne (now Dorcan) Brook. Dorcan is within the civil parish of Nythe, Eldene and Liden, and is bounded to the north by Covingham parish. It is the site of the Dorcan Industrial Estate, which includes the UK headquarters of Tyco Electronics and offices of Npower, Equiinet, MMG MagDev, Romec, House of Fraser (information systems) and a Royal Mail sorting office. The pharmaceutical company Patheon also has a manufacturing facility in the area.

The Dorcan Academy, a secondary school, is also in this area.

== Governance ==
Dorcan is part of the Badbury Park, Eldene and Liden ward which elects three members of Swindon Borough Council. The ward is part of the Swindon South parliamentary constituency for UK general elections.
