= Borough of Swindon =

Unitary authority area in Wiltshire, England

- Unitary authority area and borough
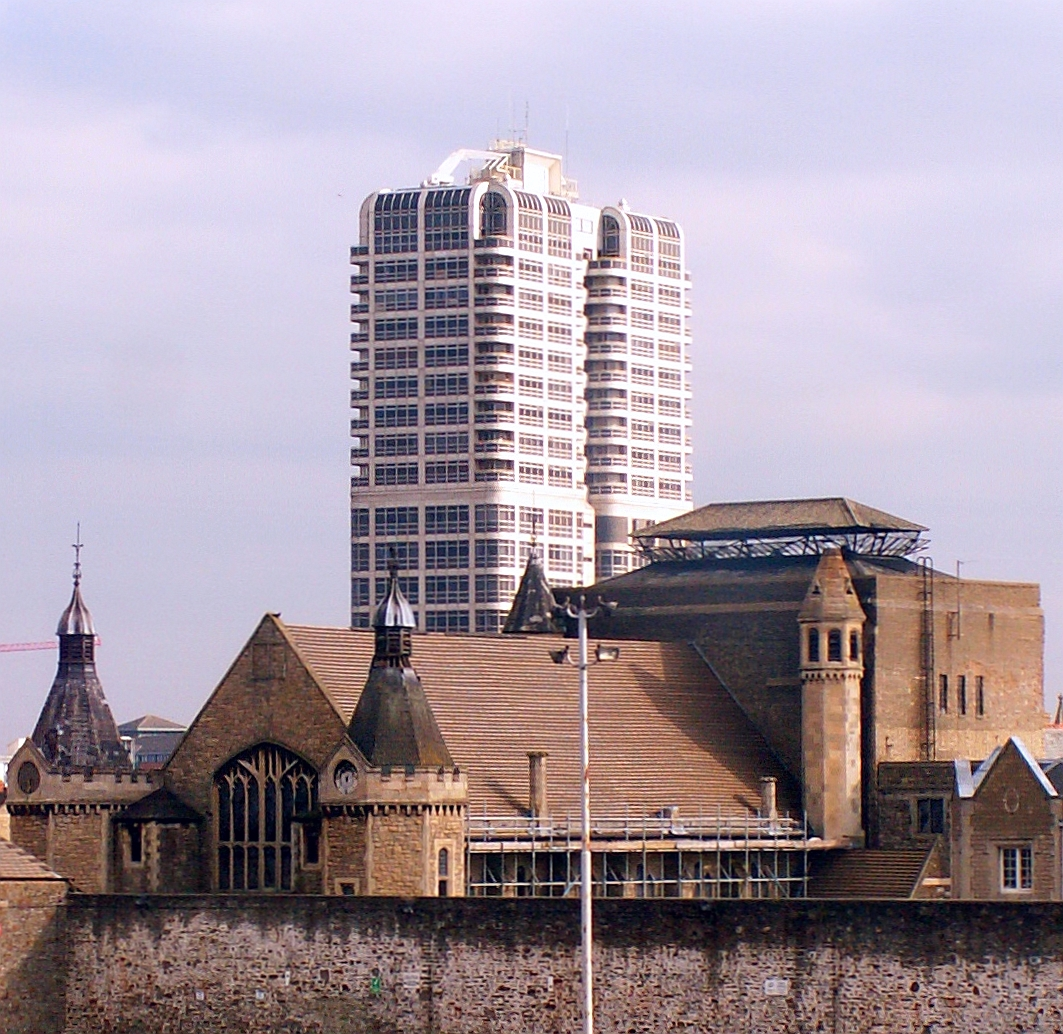

- Shown within Wiltshire
- Interactive map of Borough of Swindon
- Coordinates: 51.563°N 1.763°W
- Sovereign state: United Kingdom
- Constituent country: England
- Region: South West England
- Ceremonial county: Wiltshire
- Status: Unitary authority
- Admin HQ: Swindon

Government
  - Type: Unitary authority
  - Body: Swindon Borough Council
  - Leadership: Leader & Cabinet (No overall control)
  - MPs: Heidi Alexander (L); Will Stone (L); Danny Kruger (R)

Area
  - Total: 88.84 sq mi (230.10 km^{2})
  - Rank: 137th (of 296)

Population (2025)
  - Total: 245,286
  - Rank: 78th (of 296)
  - Density: 2,760.9/sq mi (1,066.0/km^{2})

Ethnicity (2021)
  - Ethnic groups: List: 81.5% White; 11.6% Asian; 2.8% Mixed; 2.6% Black; 1.5% other

Religion (2021)
  - Religion: List: 46.6% Christianity; 40.5% no religion; 2.7% Islam; 2.5% Hinduism; 0.7% Buddhism; 0.6% Sikhism; 0.1% Judaism; 0.6% other; 5.6% not stated
- Time zone: UTC0 (GMT)
  - Summer (DST): UTC+1 (BST)
- ISO 3166: GB-SWD
- ONS code: 00HX (ONS) E06000030 (GSS)
- OS grid reference: SU164849
- Website: Official website

The Borough of Swindon is a unitary authority area with borough status in Wiltshire, England. Centred on Swindon, it is the most north-easterly district of South West England.

== History ==
The first borough of Swindon was a municipal borough, created in 1900 as a merger of the two urban districts of Old Swindon and New Swindon.

In 1974, the borough of Thamesdown was created under the Local Government Act 1972. Thamesdown covered the areas of the municipal borough of Swindon and the neighbouring Highworth Rural District (which had been created in 1894), which were both abolished at the same time. Thamesdown was a lower-tier non-metropolitan district, with Wiltshire County Council being the higher-tier authority for the area. Thamesdown was given borough status from its creation, allowing the chair of the council to take the title of mayor.

On 1 April 1997 Thamesdown was made a unitary authority, making it administratively independent from Wiltshire County Council. In June 1996, during the transition period to becoming a unitary authority, the council passed an order that the area would be renamed Swindon with effect from 1 April 1997 as well. The former Thamesdown name and logo continued to be used by the municipal bus operator, Thamesdown Transport, until 2017 when it was sold and renamed to "Swindon's Bus Company". Swindon remains part of the ceremonial county of Wiltshire for the purposes of lieutenancy.

== Geography ==
The borough of Swindon encompasses an area forming the north east corner of Wiltshire and is bordered by two other counties, Gloucestershire (to the north) and Oxfordshire (to the east). West Berkshire is also only a short distance from the borough's south-eastern frontier. The generally hilly landscape is sculpted by the upper Thames guiding the northern border, small tributaries draining into the Thames, and the Marlborough Downs rising toward the south.

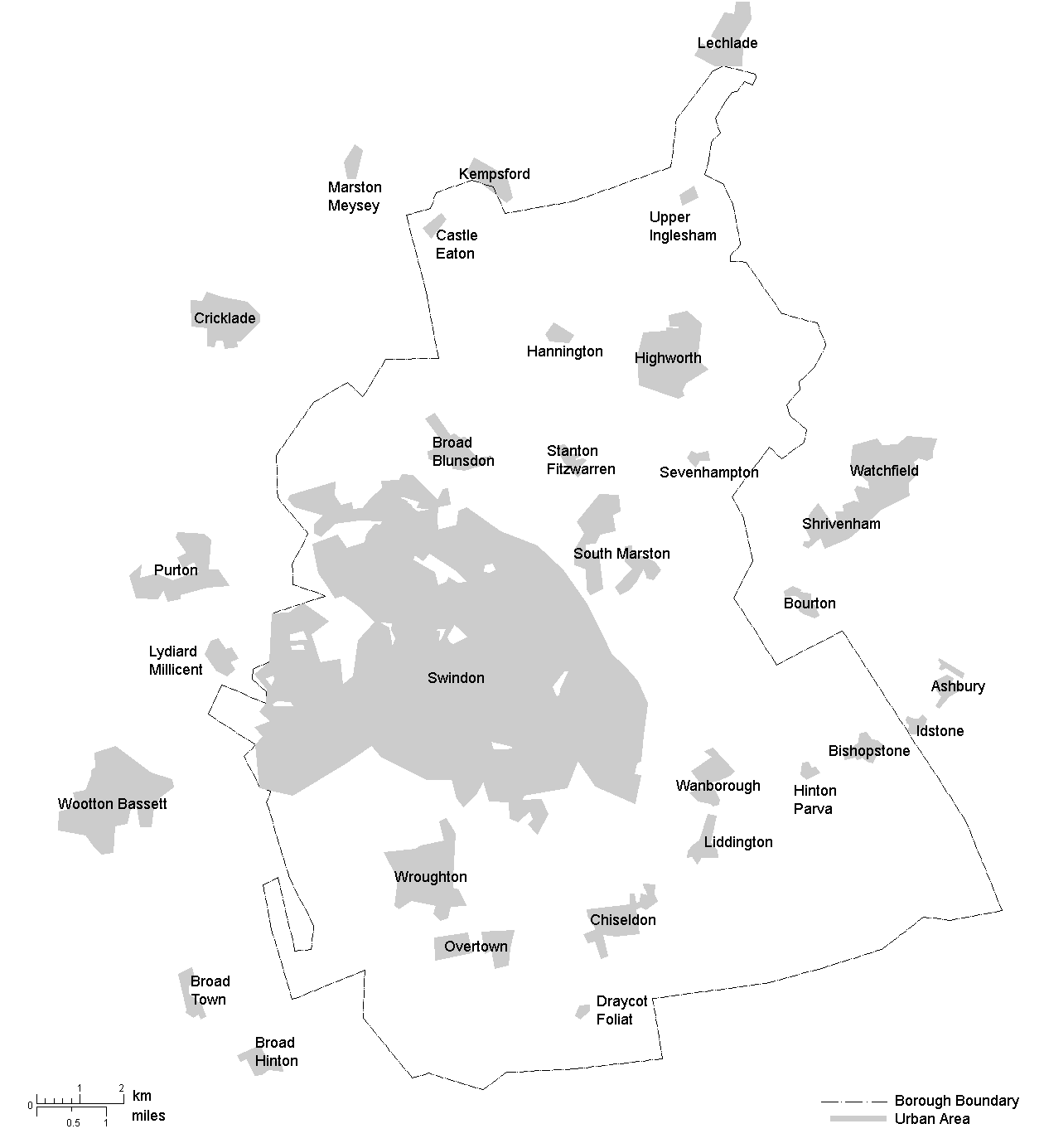
Map of the Borough of Swindon and major settlements

The borough encompasses the Swindon urban area and surrounding countryside to the north, east and south, including the town of Highworth. It comprises the former Swindon Municipal Borough and a further 18 civil parishes:

- Bishopstone (with Hinton Parva)
- Blunsdon
- Castle Eaton
- Chiseldon
- Covingham
- Hannington
- Haydon Wick
- Highworth (town and surrounding district, including Sevenhampton)
- Inglesham
- Liddington
- Nythe, Eldene and Liden
- St Andrews
- South Marston
- Stanton Fitzwarren
- Stratton St Margaret
- Wanborough
- West Swindon
- Wroughton

Since 1 April 2017 the entire Borough has been parished, following the establishment of West Swindon parish and the creation of Central Swindon North and South Swindon (originally and until 2024 named Central Swindon South). The two central parishes fall within the boundaries of the town and former municipal borough, divided along the Great Western Main Line railway.

At the same time:

- the part of Chiseldon parish north of the M4, including the former hamlet of Coate, was transferred to Central Swindon South;
- the parish of Blunsdon St Andrew was divided into St Andrews and Blunsdon, the A419 forming the boundary between them;
- the parish of Nythe was expanded to form Nythe, Eldene and Liden.

== Demographics ==
=== Ethnicity ===
The population of the Borough of Swindon was historically ethnically homogeneous, White British, but is now becoming less homogeneous, with the largest ethnic group, White British, constituting 74.2% of the population in the 2021 census. This proportion has consistently declined in each modern census, down from 91.5% in the 2001 census.

In the 2021 census, the ethnic composition of the Borough of Swindon comprised: 81.5% White, 11.6% Asian, 2.6% Black, 2.8% Mixed, and 1.5% Other.

- White (81.5%): English, Welsh, Scottish, Northern Irish or British (74.2%), Irish (0.7%), Gypsy or Irish Traveller (0.1%), Roma (0.2%), and Other White (6.3%).
- Asian (11.6%): Indian (7.6%), Pakistani (0.9%), Bangladeshi (0.6%), Chinese (0.5%), and Other Asian (2.1%).
- Black (2.6%): African (1.8%), Caribbean (0.4%), and Other Black (0.4%).
- Mixed (2.8%): White and Asian (0.7%), White and Black African (0.5%), White and Black Caribbean (0.8%), and Other Mixed or Multiple ethnic groups (0.8%).
- Other (1.5%): Arab (0.1%) and Any other ethnic group (1.3%).

Note: Sub-group totals may not sum exactly to the group total due to rounding.

Ethnic groups in the Borough of Swindon
| Ethnic Group | 2001 Census | 2011 Census | 2021 Census | | | | |
|---|---|---|---|---|---|---|---|
| Ethnic Group | 2001 Census | 2011 Census | 2021 Census | White | 95.2% | 89.8% | 81.5% |
| Asian | 2.6% | 6.4% | 11.6% | | | | |
| Black | 0.7% | 1.4% | 2.6% | | | | |
| Mixed | 1.1% | 2.0% | 2.8% | | | | |
| Other | 0.4% | 0.4% | 1.5% | | | | |

Note: The 2001 census figures for 'Asian' and 'Other' have been adjusted to reflect the 2011 reclassification of the Chinese ethnic group from 'Other' to 'Asian' to allow comparison across census years.

=== Religion ===
Religion in the Borough of Swindon (2021 United Kingdom census)
1. Christian (46.6%)
2. No religion (40.5%)
3. Muslim (2.70%)
4. Hindu (2.50%)
5. Buddhist (0.70%)
6. Sikh (0.60%)
7. Jewish (0.10%)
8. Other religion (0.60%)
9. Not stated (5.60%)

In the 2021 census, the religious composition of the Borough of Swindon comprised: 46.6% Christian, 40.5% No religion, 2.7% Muslim, 2.5% Hindu, 0.7% Buddhist, 0.6% Sikh, 0.1% Jewish, 0.6% Other religion, and 5.6% Not stated.

Religion in the Borough of Swindon
| Religion | 2001 Census | 2011 Census | 2021 Census | | | | |
|---|---|---|---|---|---|---|---|
| Religion | 2001 Census | 2011 Census | 2021 Census | Christian | 70.1% | 57.5% | 46.6% |
| No religion | 19.1% | 31.0% | 40.5% | | | | |
| Muslim | 1.0% | 1.7% | 2.7% | | | | |
| Hindu | 0.6% | 1.2% | 2.5% | | | | |
| Buddhist | 0.3% | 0.6% | 0.7% | | | | |
| Sikh | 0.6% | 0.6% | 0.6% | | | | |
| Jewish | 0.1% | 0.1% | 0.1% | | | | |
| Other religion | 0.4% | 0.5% | 0.6% | | | | |
| Not stated | 7.9% | 6.8% | 5.6% | | | | |

== Governance ==
Since May 2026, the council has operated under no overall control, governed by a Conservative administration (2026–present). This followed a Labour majority and administration from 2023 to 2026, which was preceded by a Conservative majority from 2004 to 2023 as part of a continuous Conservative administration running from 2003 to 2023. Prior to that, the council was under no overall control from 2000 to 2004, during which administrative control shifted between the Conservatives (2003–2004), Labour (2002–2003), the Conservatives (2001–2002), and Labour (2000–2001). This period followed Labour’s initial majority rule and administration from 1997 to 2000.

The council follows a leader and cabinet model and comprises 57 members elected by 25 wards. While seats were previously elected by thirds in three out of every four years, the council has changed to a system of all-out elections every four years, beginning with the 2026 Swindon Borough Council election.

=== Wards ===
- Blunsdon & Highworth (3)
- Central (3)
- Chiseldon & Lawn (2)
- Covingham & Dorcan (3)
- Eastcott (3)
- Gorse Hill & Pinehurst (3)
- Haydon Wick (3) †
- Liden, Eldene & Park South (3)
- Lydiard & Freshbrook (3)
- Mannington & Western (3)
- Old Town (3)
- Penhill & Upper Stratton (3)
- Priory Vale (3)
- Ridgeway (1)
- Rodbourne Cheney (3)
- Shaw (3)
- St Andrews (3)
- St Margaret & South Marston (3)
- Walcot & Park North (3)
- Wroughton & Wichelstowe (3)

=== Other elections ===
The borough is divided into three Parliamentary constituencies. Swindon North and Swindon South are wholly within the boundaries of the borough of Swindon, while East Wiltshire includes the Swindon borough council wards of Wroughton & Wichelstowe and Ridgeway, and the parish of Chiseldon. Swindon North and Swindon South are seen as key marginal seats at general elections, having been bellwether seats since 1997 when their predecessor constituencies were created; currently both seats are held by the Labour Party. East Wiltshire was won by the Conservative candidate Danny Kruger when it was first contested in 2024; in 2025 he switched allegiance to Reform UK.

In the 2016 United Kingdom European Union membership referendum, the Borough of Swindon electorate voted in favour of Brexit, with 54.7% supporting withdrawal from the European Union and 45.3% opting to remain a member.

== See also ==
- Swindon Borough Council elections
