= Anne Snelgrove =

British Labour politician

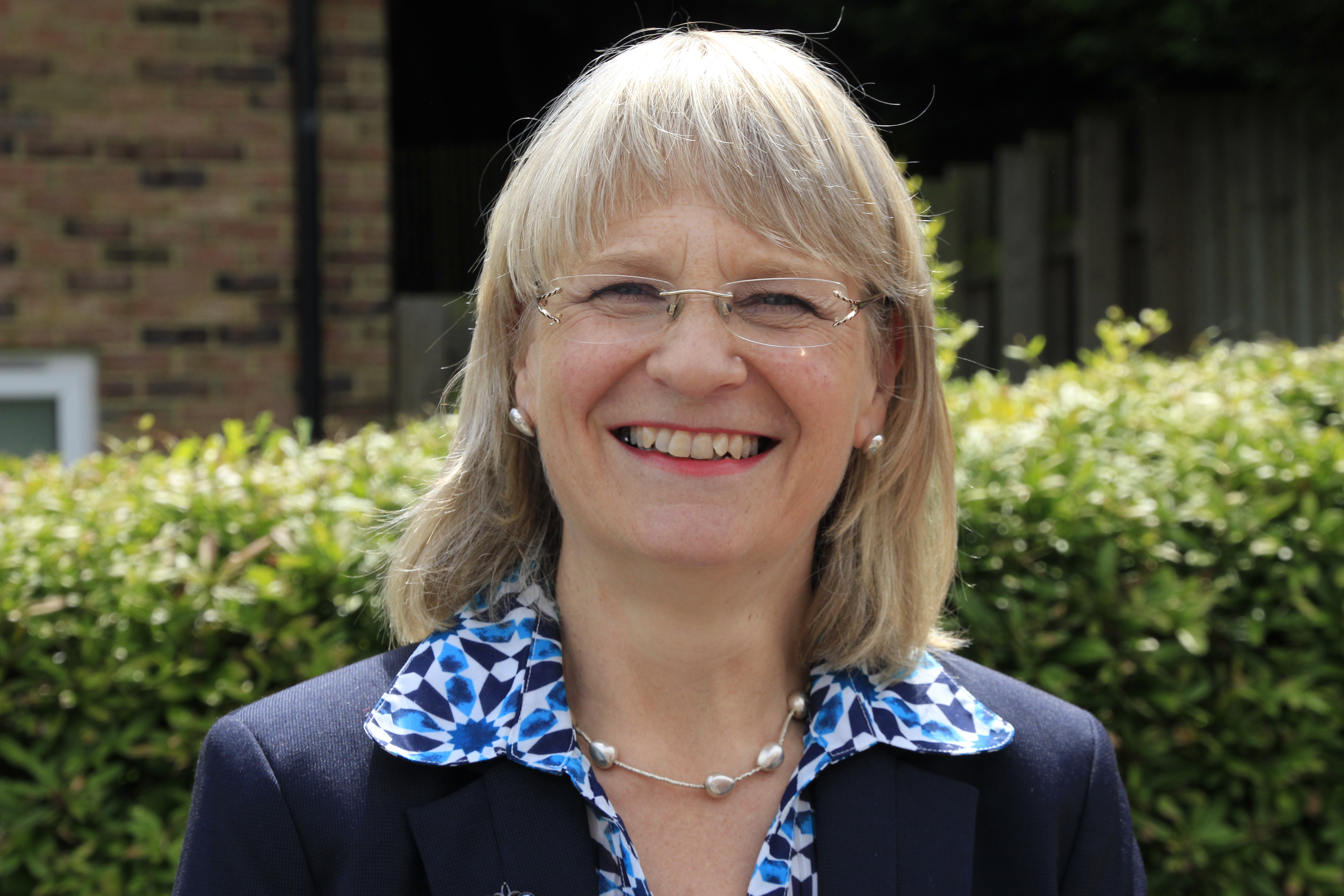

Parliamentary Private Secretary to the Prime Minister
- In office 8 June 2009 – 6 May 2010
- Prime Minister: Gordon Brown
- Preceded by: Angela Smith
- Succeeded by: Desmond Swayne

Member of Parliament for South Swindon
- In office 5 May 2005 – 12 April 2010
- Preceded by: Julia Drown
- Succeeded by: Robert Buckland

Personal details
- Born: 7 August 1957 (age 69) Wokingham, Berkshire, UK
- Party: Labour
- Education: University of Winchester

Anne Christine Snelgrove (born 7 August 1957) is a former British Labour Party politician who was the Member of Parliament (MP) for Swindon South for one term.

== Political career ==
Snelgrove was elected as MP to Swindon South at the 2005 general election., Snelgrove was Parliamentary private secretary to Prime Minister Gordon Brown. At the 2010 general election, she lost her constituency of Swindon South to Conservative MP Robert Buckland. She unsuccessfully contested the seat again for the Labour party at the 2015 general election.

== Other work ==
She launched the Geared for Giving campaign in May 2008 with Duncan Bannatyne OBE.

She later chose to step down from this position and in September 2015 began working for a secondary school – focusing on educating students in Drama and Media Studies. She left in 2019 and is retired with her husband Mike Snelgrove.
