= St Margaret and South Marston (ward) =

Ward in Swindon, Wiltshire

St Margaret and South Marston is an electoral ward in the Borough of Swindon, England. Since 2012, the ward has elected three councillors to Swindon Borough Council.

== History ==
The ward was created in 2012.

== Geography ==
The ward covers the areas of St Margaret and South Marston. The ward is part of the Swindon North parliamentary constituency.

== Demographics ==
In the 2021 census, the population of the ward was 11,577.

== See also ==
- List of electoral divisions and wards in Wiltshire
