= Nythe, Eldene and Liden =

Civil parish in Wiltshire, England

Coordinates: 51.56°N 1.74°W

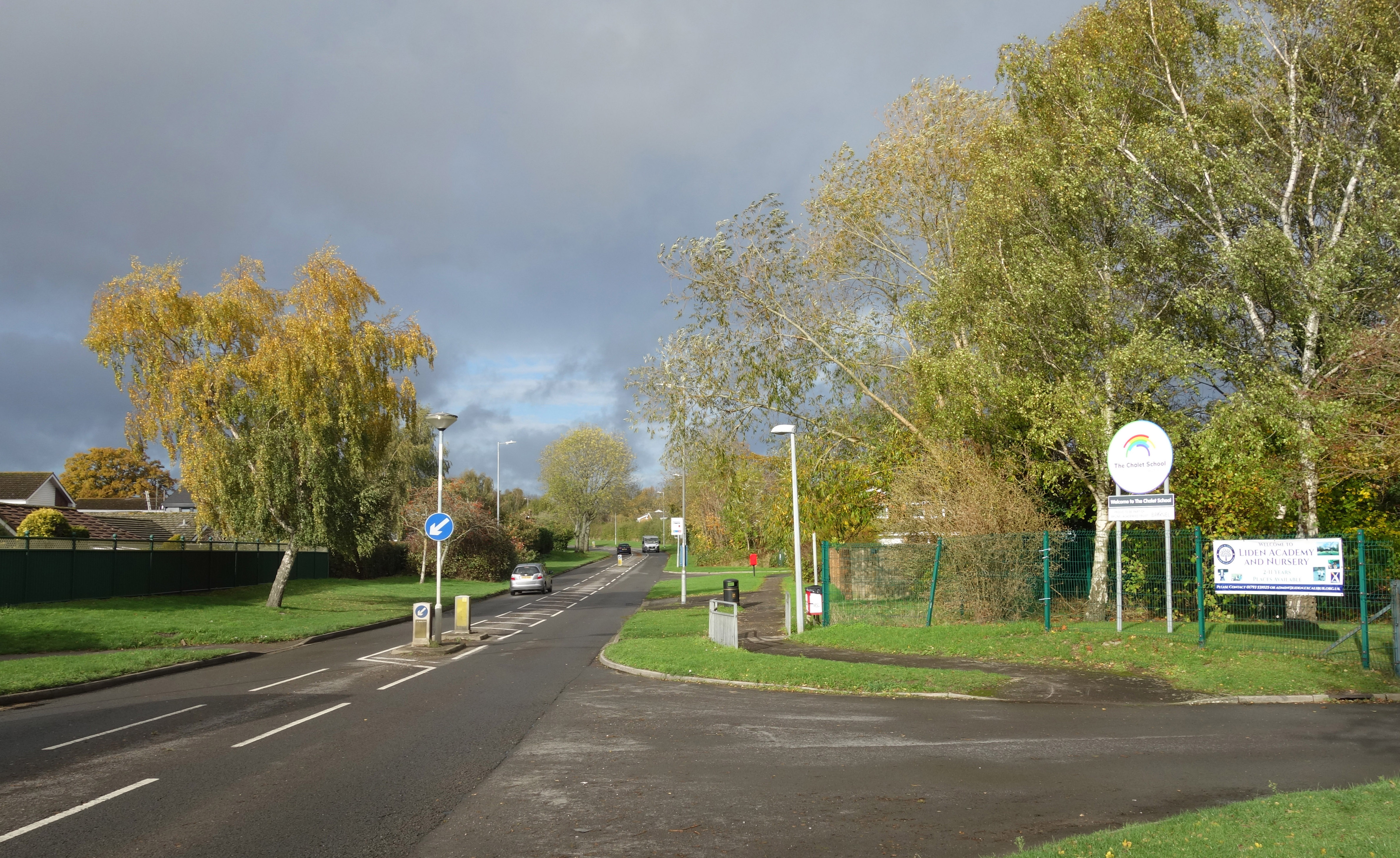
- Liden Drive

- Location within Wiltshire
- OS grid reference: SU181846
- Civil parish: Nythe, Eldene and Liden
- Unitary authority: Swindon
- Ceremonial county: Wiltshire
- Region: South West
- Country: England
- Sovereign state: United Kingdom
- Post town: Swindon
- Postcode district: SN3
- Dialling code: 01793
- Police: Wiltshire
- Fire: Dorset and Wiltshire
- Ambulance: South Western
- UK Parliament: Swindon South
- Website: nytheeldeneliden-pc.org.uk

Nythe, Eldene and Liden is a civil parish in the eastern suburbs of the town of Swindon, England. In addition to the residential areas of Nythe (in the north), Eldene and Liden (south-west and south-east), the parish has the Dorcan industrial area.

== History and governance ==
The 1948 Ordnance Survey map shows the area as farmland. In the 1960s, as part of Swindon's eastward expansion, the entire area became a privately built housing estate.

Following a Community Governance Review in 2013, Nythe obtained independence from Stratton St Margaret, becoming a parish in its own right with effect from 1 April 2015. After a further review in 2016, the parish was extended to include Eldene and Liden, which were previously unparished areas; from 1 April 2017 the name of the parish is Nythe, Eldene and Liden. The parish council has nine councillors, and one of its principal responsibilities is grounds maintenance, particularly in play areas.

Swindon Borough Council is the unitary authority for the area; Nythe and Dorcan fall within Covingham and Dorcan ward, while Eldene and Liden are part of Liden, Eldene and Park South ward. For Westminster elections, the parish is in the Swindon South constituency.

== Geography ==
The Dorcan Stream (a small tributary of the River Cole) forms the western boundary in the south, then turns east to separate Nythe from the rest of the parish. Dorcan Way, part of Swindon's B4006 orbital road, is the northern boundary of Nythe and continues in an arc through the parish to meet the A4259 Marlborough Road, which marks the southern boundary. The eastern boundary is the A419 road, a major route which connects the nearby junction 15 of the M4 motorway with north Swindon and Gloucestershire.

== Amenities ==
The parish has a community centre, a primary school and Nyland Campus, a primary school for children with special needs. Dorcan Academy, a secondary school for ages 11 to 16, is within the parish.
