= Priory Vale (ward) =

Ward in Swindon, Wiltshire

Priory Vale is an electoral ward in the Borough of Swindon, England. Since 2012, the ward has elected three councillors to Swindon Borough Council.

== History ==
The ward was created in 2012.

== Geography ==
The ward contains the area of Priory Vale, forming the boundary of Swindon with rural Wiltshire to the west, which is made by the River Ray as it runs north to the Thames. The ward is part of the Swindon North parliamentary constituency.

== Demographics ==
In the 2021 census, the population of the ward was 12,740.

== See also ==
- List of electoral divisions and wards in Wiltshire
