= Julia Drown =

British Labour Party politician

Member of Parliament for Swindon South
- In office 2 May 1997 – 11 April 2005
- Preceded by: Constituency Established
- Succeeded by: Anne Snelgrove

Personal details
- Born: 23 August 1962 (age 63)
- Party: Labour

Julia Kate Drown (born 23 August 1962) is a former British Labour Party politician. She was the member of parliament (MP) for Swindon South, in south-west England, from 1997 until 2005.

Drown was a National Health Service accountant and member of Oxfordshire County Council before her election to parliament. A mother of young children, she was at the forefront of campaigns to make Parliament more child-friendly, including the allowing of breast-feeding. Drown did not seek re-election as an MP at the 2005 general election.

As of May 2018, Drown holds several organisational positions. She chairs the Veterinary Medicines Directorate, and is a trustee of the Pension Scheme for the Nursing and Midwifery Council and Associated Employers. She also occasionally trains for Eden and Partners (a health sector leadership and training consultancy). Previously she was a member of the Human Fertilisation and Embryology Authority Appeals Committee, the Health Care Professions Council and the Audit Committee of the Nursing and Midwifery Council.

In 2022, Julia led a successful campaign to reform domestic violence legislation to make strangulation a specific offence.

Parliament of the United Kingdom
| New constituency | Member of Parliament for Swindon South; 1997–2005 | Succeeded by Anne Snelgrove |
