= Covingham =

Suburb of Swindon, England

Coordinates: 51.565°N 1.729°W

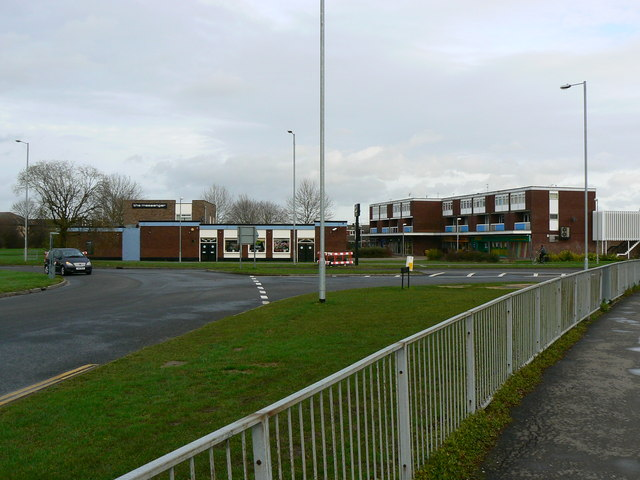
- Covingham Square in 2007

- Location within Wiltshire
- Population: 4,009 (2021 census)
- OS grid reference: SU189852
- Civil parish: Covingham
- Unitary authority: Borough of Swindon
- Ceremonial county: Wiltshire
- Region: South West
- Country: England
- Sovereign state: United Kingdom
- Post town: SWINDON
- Postcode district: SN3
- Dialling code: 01793
- Police: Wiltshire
- Fire: Dorset and Wiltshire
- Ambulance: South Western
- UK Parliament: Swindon South
- Website: Parish Council

Covingham is a suburb and civil parish in the eastern part of Swindon, Wiltshire, England. Located around 2.5 miles (4 km) from the town centre, it was developed in the 1960s as part of Swindon's eastward expansion towards the A419.

St Paul's Church was built in 1971 and is the home of a partnership between the Church of England and the Methodist Church.

Covingham civil parish was formed in 1983, from parts of Stratton St Margaret and Wanborough parishes. The area is part of the Covingham and Dorcan ward for elections to Swindon Borough Council.

== Freedom of the Parish ==
The following people have received the Freedom of the Parish of Covingham.

- Councillor Derek J. Benfield: 17 May 2021.
