= East Wiltshire =

UK Parliament constituency (since 2024)

- County constituency for the House of Commons
- Interactive map of boundaries from 2024
- Boundary of East Wiltshire in South West England
- County: Wiltshire
- Electorate: 71,109
- Major settlements: Amesbury, Marlborough, Pewsey, Ludgershall, Tidworth

Current constituency
- Created: 2024
- Member of Parliament: Danny Kruger (Reform UK)
- Seats: One
- Created from: Devizes

East Wiltshire is a constituency of the House of Commons in the UK Parliament. Further to the completion of the 2023 review of Westminster constituencies, it was first contested at the 2024 general election, when it was won by Conservative candidate Danny Kruger, who had previously represented the abolished Devizes constituency which covered much of the same area. In September 2025 he defected to Reform UK. Reform had come fourth in the 2024 general election with 16.7% of the vote.

== Constituency profile ==
East Wiltshire is a constituency located in Wiltshire, covering a large rural area between Swindon and Salisbury. Its largest settlement is the town of Amesbury, which has a population of around 13,000. Other settlements include the small towns of Ludgershall, Marlborough and Tidworth and the villages of Wroughton and Durrington. The constituency contains the ancient sites of Avebury and Stonehenge, which are popular tourist attractions. There is a large military presence in the constituency; it contains part of the Salisbury Plain Training Area, the largest military training area in the country, and the bases of Larkhill, Tidworth Camp, Bulford Camp and Boscombe Down. The constituency is generally affluent with low levels of deprivation, and house prices are above the national average.

Residents of East Wiltshire have average levels of education, high incomes and are more likely to work in professional occupations compared to the rest of the country. White people made up 92% of the population at the 2021 census. Most of the constituency is represented by Conservatives at the local council, although Liberal Democrats were elected in Marlborough and Amesbury and Reform UK councillors in Tidworth and Bulford. An estimated 54% of voters in East Wiltshire supported leaving the European Union in the 2016 referendum, marginally higher than the nationwide figure of 52%.

== Boundaries ==
The constituency is composed of:

- The Borough of Swindon wards of Ridgeway and Wroughton & Wichelstowe, together with the southern part of Chiseldon & Lawn ward (i.e. the area of Chiseldon parish)
- The District of Wiltshire electoral divisions of Aldbourne & Ramsbury, Amesbury East & Bulford, Amesbury South, Amesbury West, Avon Valley, Durrington, Ludgershall North & Rural, Marlborough East, Marlborough West, Pewsey, Pewsey Vale East, Pewsey Vale West, Tidworth East & Ludgershall South, Tidworth North & West, and Till Valley.

It comprises the following areas:

- The majority of the former Devizes constituency but excluding the town of Devizes and the area surrounding it, which is included in the newly created constituency of Melksham and Devizes; in this eastern part of Wiltshire, the largest settlement is Marlborough
- In the north, an area transferred from Swindon South which includes Wroughton and Chiseldon
- In the south, an area transferred from Salisbury which includes Tilshead, Shrewton and Amesbury.

== Members of Parliament ==
Election	Member	Party
2024	Danny Kruger	Conservative
2025	Danny Kruger	Reform UK

== Elections ==
=== Elections in the 2020s ===
General election 2024: East Wiltshire
Party	Candidate	Votes	%	±%
Conservative	Danny Kruger	16,849	35.7	−30.2
Labour	Rob Newman	12,133	25.7	+9.8
Liberal Democrats	David Kinnaird	8,204	17.4	+2.9
Reform	Stephen Talbot	7,885	16.7	N/A
Green	Emily Herbert	1,844	3.9	+0.2
True & Fair	Pete Force-Jones	278	0.6	N/A
Majority		4,716	10.0	−40.1
Turnout		47,193	65.2	−3.7
Registered electors		72,409		
Conservative hold		Swing	−20.0	

=== Elections in the 2010s ===
2019 result
Party	Vote	%
Conservative	32,301	65.9
Labour	7,778	15.9
Liberal Democrats	7,100	14.5
Green	1,809	3.7
Turnout	48,988	68.9
Electorate	71,109	

== See also ==
- Parliamentary constituencies in Wiltshire
