= Chiseldon and Lawn (ward) =

Ward in Swindon, Wiltshire

Chiseldon and Lawn is an electoral ward in the Borough of Swindon, England. Since 2012, the ward has elected two councillors to Swindon Borough Council.

== History ==
The ward was created in 2012. In 2021, a by-election was held in the ward following the death of a councillor.

== Geography ==
The ward covers the area of Chiseldon.

== Demographics ==
In the 2021 census, the population of the ward was 7,837.

== See also ==
- List of electoral divisions and wards in Wiltshire
