= 2000 Swindon Borough Council election =

2000 UK local government election

Map of the results of the 2000 Swindon council election. Conservatives in blue, Labour in red and Liberal Democrats in yellow. Striped wards have mixed representation.

The 2000 Swindon Borough Council election took place on 4 May 2000 to elect members of Swindon Unitary Council in Wiltshire, England. The whole council was up for election with boundary changes since the last election in 1999 increasing the number of seats by 5. The Labour Party lost overall control of the council to no overall control.

== Election result ==
The election saw a trial of all-postal voting in several wards, with these wards seeing turnout increase by up to 13%. In 1999 turnout in these wards had been below 20% compared to an average across Swindon of 26%, while in 2000 3 of the 4 wards which had the trial saw turnout of over 30% compared to an average of 27.6% in the whole council.

Swindon local election result 2000
| Party | Seats | Gains | Losses | Net gain/loss | Seats % | Votes % | Votes | +/− |
|---|---|---|---|---|---|---|---|---|
| Labour | 28 | | | -11 | 47.5 | | | |
| Conservative | 23 | | | +18 | 39.0 | | | |
| Liberal Democrats | 8 | | | -2 | 13.6 | | | |
