= Swindon North =

UK Parliament constituency (since 1997)

- County constituency for the House of Commons
- Boundary of Swindon North in South West England
- County: Wiltshire
- Electorate: 72,163 (2023)
- Major settlements: Swindon (part), Highworth

Current constituency
- Created: 1997
- Member of Parliament: Will Stone (Labour)
- Seats: One
- Created from: Swindon

Swindon North is a constituency (Note: A county constituency (for the purposes of election expenses and type of returning officer)) represented in the House of Commons of the UK Parliament since 2024 by Will Stone, a Labour politician. (Note: As with all constituencies, the constituency elects one Member of Parliament (MP) by the first past the post system of election at least every five years.)

Further to the completion of the 2023 Periodic Review of Westminster constituencies, the seat was formally renamed from North Swindon to Swindon North, and first contested at the 2024 general election.

== Constituency profile ==
The Brow, Haydon Wick

Swindon North is a constituency in Wiltshire in South West England. It covers the northern neighbourhoods of the town of Swindon (Blunsdon, Priory Vale, Haydon Wick, Gorse Hill and Stratton St Margaret) and the outlying town of Highworth.

Swindon was a small market town until the arrival of the Great Western Railway in 1843. This transformed the town into an important railway hub and a centre for engineering; Swindon Works was once one of the largest railway engineering complexes in the world. Swindon's location along the M4 corridor has brought technology businesses to the town in recent decades. The suburban areas in this constituency were traditionally small villages until they were absorbed into the town's expansion during the late 20th and early 21st centuries. Highworth has remained a separate market town and is notable for its well-preserved Georgian architecture.

Most of this constituency is wealthy, especially Blunsdon and Priory Vale which are highly affluent and suburban in character with many detached houses. Stratton St Margaret and the areas closer to the town centre have high levels of deprivation with denser semi-detached or terraced properties. House prices across the constituency are generally lower than the regional and UK averages.

Swindon North has a large population of middle-aged adults with families and low proportions of young adults and retirees. Residents have above-average levels of income and homeownership and a below-average child poverty rate. They generally have low levels of education and a high proportion work in the transport, retail and manufacturing sectors. The percentage of residents claiming unemployment benefits is low. White people made up 87% of the population at the 2021 census.

At the local borough council, the areas close to the town centre like Gorse Hill are represented by the Labour Party, the denser suburbs like Stratton St Margaret by Reform UK, and the outer, wealthier suburbs and rural areas by Conservatives. An estimated 57% of voters in Swindon North supported leaving the European Union in the 2016 referendum, higher than the UK-wide figure of 52%.

== History ==
North Swindon was created in 1997 and has been a bellwether since then. However, during the 2010s, the Conservatives won the constituency by much higher numbers than their national popular vote margin.

== Boundaries ==
Map of boundaries 2010-2024

Map of boundaries from 2024

1997–2010: The Borough of Thamesdown wards of Blunsdon, Covingham, Gorse Hill, Haydon Wick, Highworth, Moredon, St Margaret, St Philip, Western, and Whitworth, and the District of North Wiltshire ward of Cricklade.

The seat's boundaries encompassed an area that before its creation made up parts of the former Swindon constituency and pre-1997 versions of North Wiltshire and Devizes.

2010–2024: The Borough of Swindon wards of Abbey Meads, Blunsdon and Highworth, Covingham and Nythe, Gorse Hill and Pinehurst, Haydon Wick, Moredon, Penhill, St Margaret, St Philip, and Western.

In the 2010 boundary changes, the town of Cricklade became part of the North Wiltshire constituency while this seat acquired parts of the South Swindon constituency.

2024–present: Further to the 2023 Periodic Review of Westminster constituencies which came into effect for the 2024 general election, the constituency is composed of the following (as they existed on 1 December 2020):

- The Borough of Swindon wards of: Blunsdon and Highworth; Gorse Hill and Pinehurst; Haydon Wick; Penhill and Upper Stratton; Priory Vale; Rodbourne Cheney; St. Andrews; St. Margaret and South Marston.

In order to bring the electorate within the permitted range and align with revised ward boundaries, the districts of Covingham and Nythe were transferred to Swindon South.

== Members of Parliament ==
Election	Member	Party
1997	Michael Wills	Labour
2010	Justin Tomlinson	Conservative
2024	Will Stone	Labour

== Elections ==
=== Elections in the 2020s ===
General election 2024: Swindon North
Party	Candidate	Votes	%	±%
Labour	Will Stone	17,930	40.6	+10.1
Conservative	Justin Tomlinson	13,827	31.3	–27.2
Reform	Les Willis	7,557	17.1	N/A
Green	Andy Bentley	2,366	5.4	+2.3
Liberal Democrats	Flo Clucas	2,086	4.7	–3.2
Independent	Debbie Hicks	260	0.6	N/A
TUSC	Scott Hunter	139	0.3	N/A
Majority		4,103	9.3	N/A
Turnout		44,165	60.3	–5.4
Registered electors		73,238		
Labour gain from Conservative		Swing	▲19.3	

=== Elections in the 2010s ===
2019 notional result
Party	Vote	%
Conservative	27,719	58.5
Labour	14,469	30.5
Liberal Democrats	3,744	7.9
Green	1,449	3.1
Turnout	47,381	65.7
Electorate	72,163	

General election 2019: North Swindon
Party	Candidate	Votes	%	±%
Conservative	Justin Tomlinson	32,584	59.1	+5.5
Labour	Kate Linnegar	16,413	29.8	–8.6
Liberal Democrats	Katie Critchlow	4,408	8.0	+4.4
Green	Andy Bentley	1,710	3.1	+1.5
Majority		16,171	29.3	+14.1
Turnout		55,115	66.9	–1.6
Conservative hold		Swing	+7.1	

General election 2017: North Swindon
Party	Candidate	Votes	%	±%
Conservative	Justin Tomlinson	29,431	53.6	+3.3
Labour	Mark Dempsey	21,096	38.4	+10.6
Liberal Democrats	Liz Webster	1,962	3.6	+0.3
UKIP	Steve Halden	1,564	2.8	–12.5
Green	Andy Bentley	858	1.6	–1.7
Majority		8,335	15.2	–7.3
Turnout		54,911	68.5	+4.0
Conservative hold		Swing	–3.65	

General election 2015: North Swindon
Party	Candidate	Votes	%	±%
Conservative	Justin Tomlinson	26,295	50.3	+5.7
Labour	Mark Dempsey	14,509	27.8	–2.7
UKIP	James Faulkner	8,011	15.3	+11.6
Green	Poppy Hebden-Leeder	1,723	3.3	+2.3
Liberal Democrats	Janet Ellard	1,704	3.3	–13.9
Majority		11,786	22.5	+8.4
Turnout		52,242	64.5	+0.3
Conservative hold		Swing	+4.3	

General election 2010: North Swindon
Party	Candidate	Votes	%	±%
Conservative	Justin Tomlinson	22,408	44.6	+5.7
Labour	Victor Agarwal	15,348	30.5	–14.6
Liberal Democrats	Jane Lock	8,668	17.2	+4.4
UKIP	Stephen Halden	1,842	3.7	+1.4
BNP	Reg Bates	1,542	3.1	N/A
Green	Bill Hughes	487	1.0	N/A
Majority		7,060	14.1	N/A
Turnout		50,295	64.2	+3.4
Conservative gain from Labour		Swing	+10.1	

=== Elections in the 2000s ===
General election 2005: North Swindon
Party	Candidate	Votes	%	±%
Labour	Michael Wills	19,612	43.7	–9.2
Conservative	Justin Tomlinson	17,041	38.0	+4.3
Liberal Democrats	Mike Evemy	6,831	15.2	+3.6
UKIP	Robert Tingey	998	2.2	+0.3
Socialist Unity	Andy Newman	208	0.5	N/A
Independent	Ernest Reynolds	195	0.4	N/A
Majority		2,571	5.7	–13.5
Turnout		44,885	61.0	0.0
Labour hold		Swing	–6.7	

General election 2001: North Swindon
Party	Candidate	Votes	%	±%
Labour	Michael Wills	22,371	52.9	+3.1
Conservative	Nick Martin	14,266	33.7	–0.1
Liberal Democrats	David Nation	4,891	11.6	–1.3
UKIP	Brian Lloyd	800	1.9	N/A
Majority		8,105	19.2	+3.2
Turnout		42,328	61.0	–12.7
Labour hold		Swing		

=== Elections in the 1990s ===
General election 1997: North Swindon
Party	Candidate	Votes	%	±%
Labour	Michael Wills	24,029	49.8	
Conservative	Guy Opperman	16,341	33.8	
Liberal Democrats	Mike Evemy	6,237	12.9	
Referendum	Gillian Goldsmith	1,533	3.2	
Natural Law	Alexander Fisken	130	0.3	
Majority		7,688	16.0	
Turnout		48,270	73.66	
Labour win (new seat)				

== See also ==
- List of parliamentary constituencies in Wiltshire
