= Swindon Borough Council =

Local authority in Wiltshire, England

Type
- Type: Unitary authority

Leadership
- Mayor: Neil Hopkins, Labour since 22 May 2026
- Leader: Gary Sumner, Conservative since 22 May 2026
- Chief Executive: Samantha Mowbray since July 2023

Structure
- Seats: 57 councillors
- Political groups: Minority administration (23) Conservative (23) Opposition (34) Labour (19) Reform (14) Liberal Democrats (1)
- Length of term: 4 years

Elections
- Voting system: Plurality-at-large
- Last election: 7 May 2026
- Next election: 2 May 2030

Meeting place
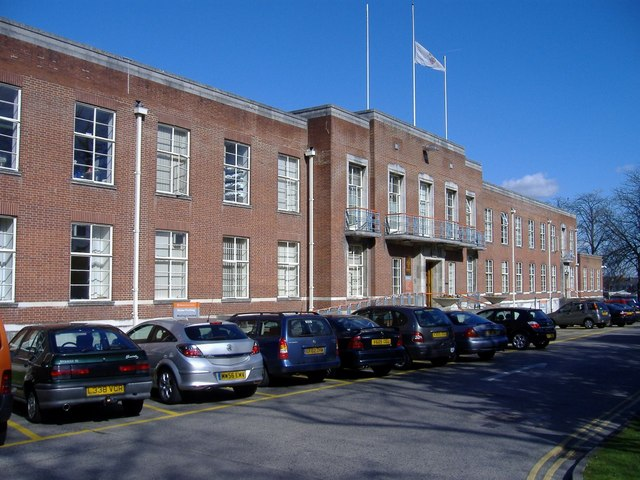
- Civic Offices, Euclid Street, Swindon, SN1 2JH

Website
- www.swindon.gov.uk

Swindon Borough Council is the local authority of the Borough of Swindon in the ceremonial county of Wiltshire, England. It was founded in 1974 as Thamesdown Borough Council, and was a lower-tier district council until 1997. In 1997 it was renamed Swindon Borough Council and became a unitary authority, being a district council which also performs the functions of a county council; it is separate from Wiltshire Council, the unitary authority which administers the rest of the county.

The council has been under no overall control since 2026. The Conservatives are the largest party and run the council as a minority administration. It is based at the Civic Offices on Euclid Street.

== History ==
The town of Swindon was made a municipal borough in 1900 as a merger of the two urban districts of Old Swindon and New Swindon. Swindon was then governed by a body formally called the 'mayor, aldermen and burgesses of the borough of Swindon', generally known as the corporation, town council or borough council.

That first borough of Swindon, and its council, was abolished in 1974 under the Local Government Act 1972, when its area was merged with the neighbouring Highworth Rural District to become a new non-metropolitan district called Thamesdown. Thamesdown was given borough status from its creation, allowing the chair of the council to take the title of mayor. Thamesdown Borough Council was a lower-tier district council, with Wiltshire County Council providing county-level services in the borough.

On 1 April 1997 Thamesdown was made a unitary authority, making it administratively independent from Wiltshire County Council. The way the change was implemented was to create a new non-metropolitan county called Thamesdown covering the same area as the borough, but with no separate county council. Instead, the existing borough council took on county council functions, making it a unitary authority. In June 1996, during the transition period to becoming a unitary authority, the council passed an order that the borough and the new non-metropolitan county would both be renamed Swindon with effect from 1 April 1997 as well. Swindon remains part of the ceremonial county of Wiltshire for the purposes of lieutenancy.

== Powers, functions and operations ==
The local authority derives its powers and functions from the Local Government Act 1972 and subsequent legislation. For the purposes of local government, Swindon Borough is a non-metropolitan area of England. As a unitary authority, Swindon Borough Council has the powers and functions of both a non-metropolitan county and district council. In its capacity as a district council it is a billing authority collecting council tax and business rates, it processes local planning applications, and it is responsible for housing, waste collection and environmental health. In its capacity as a county council it is a local education authority, responsible for social services, libraries and waste disposal.

Since 2010, many schools in the area have become academies and are no longer controlled by the council. It was also the owner of Swindon's main bus operator, Thamesdown Transport, until 2017 when it sold the business to the Go-Ahead Group due to issues with funding. Maintenance services are usually contracted to Swindon Commercial Services (SCS), who work in partnership with the council.

The council's principal decision-making body is its cabinet, which comprises the leader and (as of 2026) nine portfolio-holding members.

== Political control ==
The council has been under no overall control since the 2026 election, with the Conservatives being the largest party. They subsequently formed a minority administration to run the council.

The first election to Thamesdown Borough Council was held in 1973, initially operating as a shadow authority alongside the outgoing authorities until it came into its powers on 1 April 1974. Thamesdown was renamed Swindon and became a unitary authority on 1 April 1997. Political control of the council since 1974 has been as follows:

Thamesdown Borough Council (lower tier non-metropolitan district)

Party in control	Years
Labour	1974–1976
No overall control	1976–1978
Labour	1978–1997

Swindon Borough Council (unitary authority)

Party in control	Years
Labour	1997–2000
No overall control	2000–2004
Conservative	2004–2023
Labour	2023–2026
No overall control	2026–present

=== Leadership ===
The role of mayor is largely ceremonial in Swindon, with political leadership instead being provided by the leader of the council. The leaders since 1995 have been:

Councillor	Party	From	To
Sue Bates	Labour	1995	1998
Maurice Fanning	Labour	1998	1999
Sue Bates	Labour	1999	27 Sep 2001
Mike Bawden	Conservative	11 Oct 2001	May 2002
Sue Bates	Labour	17 May 2002	Aug 2002
Kevin Small	Labour	21 Aug 2002	May 2003
Mike Bawden	Conservative	16 May 2003	May 2006
Roderick Bluh	Conservative	19 May 2006	Apr 2013
David Renard	Conservative	11 Apr 2013	May 2023
Jim Robbins	Labour	19 May 2023	May 2026
Gary Sumner	Conservative	22 May 2026	

=== Composition ===
Following the 2026 election, the composition of the council is:

Party	Councillors
Conservative	23
Labour	19
Reform	14
Liberal Democrats	1
Total	57

The next elections are due on or before 2 May 2030.

== Premises ==
The council is based at the Civic Offices on Euclid Street in Swindon. The building was built for the old municipal borough council, and had been formally opened by Prince Henry, Duke of Gloucester on 5 July 1938.

== Elections ==
Fifty-seven councillors are elected by the borough's 20 wards for four-year terms. The entire council stands for election every four years after a 2023 change in the election structure. The first election in which all seats were contested was the 2026 Swindon Borough Council election.

=== Wards and councillors ===
Parliamentary constituency	Ward	Councillor	Party	Term of office
Swindon North	Blunsdon and Highworth	Steve Weisinger	Conservative	2022–26
Swindon North	Blunsdon and Highworth	Nick Gardiner	Conservative	2023–26
Swindon North	Blunsdon and Highworth	Vijay Manro	Conservative	2024–26
Swindon North	Gorse Hill and Pinehurst	Carol Shelley	Labour	2022–26
Swindon North	Gorse Hill and Pinehurst	John Ballman	Labour	2023–26
Swindon North	Gorse Hill and Pinehurst	Princia Fernandes	Labour	2024–26
Swindon North	Haydon Wick	Matt Lodge	Independent	2022–26
Swindon North	Haydon Wick	Stanka Adamcova	Labour	2023–26
Swindon North	Haydon Wick	Ray Ballman	Labour	2024–26
Swindon North	Penhill and Upper Stratton	Claire Crilly	Labour	2022–26
Swindon North	Penhill and Upper Stratton	Ravi Ventakesh	Labour	2023–26
Swindon North	Penhill and Upper Stratton	Thomas Smith	Labour	2024–26
Swindon North	Priory Vale	Rob Heath*	Green	2022–26
Swindon North	Priory Vale	Rajhia Ali	Labour	2023–26
Swindon North	Priory Vale	Ian Edwards*	Green	2024–26
Swindon North	Rodbourne Cheney	William Stone	Labour	2022–26
Swindon North	Rodbourne Cheney	Jim Grant	Labour	2023–26
Swindon North	Rodbourne Cheney	Ana Fernandes	Labour	2024–26
Swindon North	St Andrews	Jake Chandler	Conservative	2022–26
Swindon North	St Andrews	Jason Mills	Labour	2023–26
Swindon North	St Andrews	Daniel Adams	Conservative	2024–26
Swindon North	St Margaret and South Marston	Matthew Vallender	Conservative	2022–26
Swindon North	St Margaret and South Marston	Tom Butcher*	Green	2023–26
Swindon North	St Margaret and South Marston	Simon Shelley	Labour	2024–26
Swindon South	Central	Anabelle Pegado	Conservative	2022–26
Swindon South	Central	Adorabelle Amaral-Shaikh	Labour	2023–26
Swindon South	Central	Domingos Dias	Labour	2024–26
Swindon South	Covingham and Dorcan	Kevin Parry	Conservative	2022–26
Swindon South	Covingham and Dorcan	Dale Heenan	Conservative	2023–26
Swindon South	Covingham and Dorcan	Barbara Parry	Conservative	2024–26
Swindon South	Eastcott	Imtiyaz Shaikh	Labour	2022–26
Swindon South	Eastcott	Paul Dixon	Labour	2023–26
Swindon South	Eastcott	Marina Strinkovsky	Labour	2024–26
Swindon South	Liden, Eldene and Park South	Janine Howarth	Labour	2022–26
Swindon South	Liden, Eldene and Park South	Mike Davies	Labour	2023–26
Swindon South	Liden, Eldene and Park South	Marianne Le Coyte-Grinney	Labour	2024–26
Swindon South	Lydiard and Freshbrook	Sean Wilson	Labour	2022–26
Swindon South	Lydiard and Freshbrook	Repi Begum*	Green	2023–26
Swindon South	Lydiard and Freshbrook	Leon Grother	Labour	2024–26
Swindon South	Mannington and Western	Jim Robbins	Labour	2022–26
Swindon South	Mannington and Western	Fay Howard	Labour	2023–26
Swindon South	Mannington and Western	Kevin Small	Labour	2024–26
Swindon South	Old Town	Nadine Watts	Labour	2022–26
Swindon South	Old Town	Chris Watts	Labour	2023–26
Swindon South	Old Town	Jane Milner-Barry	Labour	2024–26
Swindon South	Shaw	Suresha Gattapur	Conservative	2022–26
Swindon South	Shaw	Junab Ali	Labour	2023–26
Swindon South	Shaw	Rose Llewellyn	Labour	2024–26
Swindon South	Walcot and Park North	Abdul Amin	Labour	2022–26
Swindon South	Walcot and Park North	Emma Bushell	Labour	2023–26
Swindon South	Walcot and Park North	Mohammed Miah	Labour	2024–26
Swindon South and East Wiltshire	Chiseldon and Lawn	Lawrence Elliott	Conservative	2022–26
Swindon South and East Wiltshire	Chiseldon and Lawn	Neil Hopkins	Labour	2023–26
East Wiltshire	Ridgeway	Gary Sumner	Conservative	2024–26
East Wiltshire	Wroughton and Wichelstowe	Adam Poole	Liberal Democrats	2023–26
East Wiltshire	Wroughton and Wichelstowe	Elaine Cook	Conservative	2024–26
East Wiltshire	Wroughton and Wichelstowe	Matty Courtliff	Conservative	2024–26

*Elected as Labour candidates, defecting to Green in 2025.
