= 2012 Swindon Borough Council election =

2012 UK local government election

Map of the results of the 2012 Swindon council election. Conservatives in blue, Labour in red and Liberal Democrats in yellow. Striped wards have mixed representation.

Elections to Swindon Borough Council were held on 3 May 2012, with every ward up for election after the implementation of boundary changes. The Conservatives were the largest party on the council going into the elections, and were looking to hold on to power, while Labour were aiming to oust the Conservatives and take control of the council. The election resulted in the Conservatives maintaining control of the council with a majority of one seat, while Labour made gains.

Following this election, the Borough Council will be elected a third at a time. The candidates who finished third in their three-seat ward in 2012 will serve a two-year term before facing re-election in 2014. Those who finished second will face re-election in 2015, and those who finished first will serve until 2016. In the two-seat Chiseldon and Lawn Ward, the candidate who finished second will face re-election in 2014, and the first place candidate the following year, while the single councillor for Ridgeway Ward will sit until 2016.

== Overall result ==
Swindon Council election, 2012
Party	Seats	Gains	Losses	Net gain/loss	Seats %	Votes %	Votes	+/−
Conservative	29				50.9			
Labour	24				42.1			
Liberal Democrats	4				7.0			
UKIP	0				0.0			
Green	0				0.0			
Independent	0				0.0			
Total	57							

== Ward results ==
The results of the election are:

=== Blunsdon and Highworth ===
Blunsdon and Highworth (3 seats)
Party	Candidate	Votes	%	±%
Conservative	Maureen Rita Penny	1,530	44.8	N/A
Conservative	Alan John Bishop	1,528	–	
Conservative	Doreen Dart	1,489	–	
Labour	Phil Beaumont	1,067	31.3	N/A
Labour	Alison Mary Durrant	968	–	
Labour	Phillip Edward Gaskin	824	–	
Green	Andrew Donald Day	442	13.0	N/A
Liberal Democrats	Jenny Shorten	374	11.0	N/A
Turnout		2,974	34.23	N/A
Registered electors		8,689		
Conservative win (new seat)				
Conservative win (new seat)				
Conservative win (new seat)				

=== Central ===
Central (3 seats)
Party	Candidate	Votes	%	±%
Labour	Bob Wright	1,947	70.1	+5.2
Labour	Julie Wright	1,899	–	
Labour	Junab Ali	1,788	–	
Conservative	Tim French	356	12.8	–3.9
Conservative	Jaki Dawn Fairbrother	341	–	
Conservative	Kashif Khan	276	–	
Green	Simon Smith	273	9.8	+4.3
Liberal Democrats	Joan Mortimer	200	7.2	–0.4
Liberal Democrats	Christopher Robert Shepherd	164	–	
Liberal Democrats	John Williams	159	–	
Turnout		2,784	31.00	–3.28
Registered electors		8,981		
Labour hold		Swing		
Labour hold		Swing		
Labour hold		Swing		

=== Chiseldon and Lawn ===
Chiseldon and Lawn (2 seats)
Party	Candidate	Votes	%	±%
Conservative	Fionuala Mary Foley	938	42.8	N/A
Conservative	Mike Bawden	910	–	
Independent	Jim Boyd	626	28.5	N/A
Labour	Geraint Day	387	17.6	N/A
Labour	Helen Thompson	315	–	
Liberal Democrats	Louise Cole	242	11.0	N/A
Liberal Democrats	Trevor Smith	223	–	
Turnout		1,976	41.73	N/A
Registered electors		4,735		
Conservative win (new seat)				
Conservative win (new seat)				

=== Covingham and Dorcan ===
Covingham and Dorcan (3 seats)
Party	Candidate	Votes	%	±%
Conservative	Richard James Hurley	1,475	41.0	N/A
Conservative	Dale James Heenan	1,469	–	
Labour	Julian Charles Price	1,314	36.5	N/A
Conservative	Kevin James Parry	1,294	–	
Labour	Pamela Lesley Adams	1,283	–	
Labour	Brett Frank Sparkes	1,151	–	
UKIP	Corinna Christine Allen	603	16.8	N/A
Liberal Democrats	Clive Hooper	207	5.8	N/A
Turnout		3,302	37.33	N/A
Registered electors		8,845		
Conservative win (new seat)				
Conservative win (new seat)				
Labour win (new seat)				

=== Eastcott ===
Eastcott (3 seats)
Party	Candidate	Votes	%	±%
Liberal Democrats	Stan Pajak	1,497	49.6	+10.3
Liberal Democrats	Nicky Sewell	1,365	–	
Liberal Democrats	Dave Wood	1,320	–	
Labour	Emma Bushell	1,046	34.7	–0.7
Labour	Chris Watts	1,021	–	
Labour	Andy Newman	961	–	
Conservative	Valerie Anne Butt	249	8.3	–7.9
Green	Bill Hughes	224	7.4	+1.4
Conservative	Emma Katharine Carter	215	–	
Conservative	Bruce Kingstree	203	–	
Turnout		2,841	35.70	–2.45
Registered electors		7,959		
Liberal Democrats hold		Swing		
Liberal Democrats hold		Swing		
Liberal Democrats hold		Swing		

=== Gorse Hill and Pinehurst ===
Gorse Hill and Pinehurst (3 seats)
Party	Candidate	Votes	%	±%
Labour	Ray Ballman	1,619	67.5	+7.8
Labour	John Ballman	1,537	–	
Labour	Rochelle Ellen Russell	1,450	–	
Conservative	Janet Angela Heenan	512	21.4	–1.1
Conservative	Trudy Jayne Heenan	481	–	
Conservative	Frits Oostendorp	432	–	
Liberal Democrats	John Harold Kurton	266	11.1	–0.2
Turnout		2,378	26.15	–4.14
Registered electors		9,092		
Labour hold		Swing		
Labour hold		Swing		
Labour hold		Swing		

=== Haydon Wick ===
Haydon Wick (3 seats)
Party	Candidate	Votes	%	±%
Conservative	Rex Barnett	1,390	43.6	–11.9
Conservative	David Charles Renard	1,299	–	
Conservative	Claire Ann Ellis	1,168	–	
Labour	Maura Julia Clarke	993	31.2	+1.4
Labour	Mark James Viner	904	–	
Labour	Wayne Smith	897	–	
UKIP	Ed Gerrard	339	10.6	+2.5
Green	Chris Brock	263	8.3	N/A
Liberal Democrats	Deborah King	202	6.3	–0.3
Turnout		3,003	32.58	–8.05
Registered electors		9,217		
Conservative hold		Swing		
Conservative hold		Swing		
Conservative hold		Swing		

=== Liden, Eldene and Park South ===
Liden, Eldene and Park South (3 seats)
Party	Candidate	Votes	%	±%
Labour	Fay Howard	1,334	42.7	N/A
Labour	Neil James Heavens	1,305	–	
Labour	Derique Montaut	1,233	–	
Conservative	Sinéad Darker	1,049	33.6	N/A
Conservative	David William Wren	1,027	–	
Conservative	Andy Albinson	960	–	
UKIP	Robert William Sheppard	524	16.8	N/A
Liberal Democrats	Anne Baxter	218	7.0	N/A
Turnout		2,835	32.87	N/A
Registered electors		8,626		
Labour win (new seat)				
Labour win (new seat)				
Labour win (new seat)				

=== Lydiard and Freshbrook ===
Lydiard and Freshbrook (3 seats)
Party	Candidate	Votes	%	±%
Conservative	Mick Bray	1,302	34.8	N/A
Labour	Cindy Matthews	1,173	31.4	N/A
Conservative	Michael James Dickinson	1,115	–	
Conservative	Dwynwen Mary Martin	1,085	–	
Labour	Ged Meheran	1,015	–	
Labour	Jamal Miah	943	–	
UKIP	John Lenton	467	12.5	N/A
Liberal Democrats	Juliet Hughes	404	10.8	N/A
Green	Marilyn Harrison	391	10.5	N/A
Turnout		2,912	33.38	N/A
Registered electors		8,725		
Conservative win (new seat)				
Labour win (new seat)				
Conservative win (new seat)				

=== Mannington and Western ===
Mannington and Western (3 seats)
Party	Candidate	Votes	%	±%
Labour	Kevin David Small	1,119	51.3	N/A
Labour	Steve Wakefield	1,084	–	
Labour	James Philip Robbins	1,049	–	
Conservative	David Gould	547	25.1	N/A
Conservative	Tim Swinyard	531	–	
Conservative	Caryl Sydney-Smith	485	–	
Green	Karl Russell North	310	14.2	N/A
Liberal Democrats	Margaret Joan Hooper	205	9.4	N/A
Turnout		1,972	26.33	N/A
Registered electors		7,489		
Labour win (new seat)				
Labour win (new seat)				
Labour win (new seat)				

=== Old Town ===
Old Town (3 seats)
Party	Candidate	Votes	%	±%
Conservative	Brian Peter Mattock	971	31.0	N/A
Conservative	Roderick Bluh	871	–	
Labour	Nadine Watts	785	25.0	N/A
Conservative	Peter Mallinson	777	–	
Labour	Paul Dixon	754	–	
Labour	Norman Butler	683	–	
Independent	Kareen Boyd	626	20.0	N/A
Liberal Democrats	Lynda Barber	276	8.8	N/A
Green	David Miles	252	8.0	N/A
Liberal Democrats	Tracey Ockley	251	–	
Liberal Democrats	Catherine Rachael Smith	238	–	
UKIP	John Short	225	7.2	N/A
UKIP	Terry Richard Davis	207	–	
UKIP	Noel Gardner	185	–	
Turnout		2,525	34.59	N/A
Registered electors		7,300		
Conservative win (new seat)				
Conservative win (new seat)				
Labour win (new seat)				

=== Penhill and Upper Stratton ===
Penhill and Upper Stratton (3 seats)
Party	Candidate	Votes	%	±%
Labour	Paul John Baker	1,142	62.9	N/A
Labour	Teresa Jessica Page	1,134	–	
Labour	Joseph William Tray	1,109	–	
Conservative	Ray Fisher	531	29.2	N/A
Conservative	Lucy Emma Britton	443	–	
Conservative	Ceej Ntsiu	396	–	
Liberal Democrats	Tom Pajak	144	7.9	N/A
Turnout		2,677	28.83	N/A
Registered electors		9,285		
Labour win (new seat)				
Labour win (new seat)				
Labour win (new seat)				

=== Priory Vale ===
Priory Vale (3 seats)
Party	Candidate	Votes	%	±%
Conservative	Mark Anthony Edwards	1,227	57.2	N/A
Conservative	Toby Lewis Elliott	1,161	–	
Conservative	Emma Louise Faramarzi	1,109	–	
Labour	Stephen Mark Hale Adams	466	21.7	N/A
Labour	Patrick John Oliver Murphy	464	–	
Labour	Tara Siobain Page	459	–	
UKIP	Gary Belben	308	14.4	N/A
Liberal Democrats	Ray James	145	6.8	N/A
Turnout		2,025	23.48	N/A
Registered electors		8,624		
Conservative win (new seat)				
Conservative win (new seat)				
Conservative win (new seat)				

=== Ridgeway ===
Ridgeway
Party	Candidate	Votes	%	±%
Conservative	Andrew Bennett	460	42.6	–19.0
Liberal Democrats	Gina Akers	384	35.6	+2.5
Labour	Carol Heavens	128	11.9	+6.6
UKIP	Paul Kosidowski	107	9.9	N/A
Majority		76	7.0	–21.4
Turnout		1,082	41.99	–1.11
Registered electors		2,577		
Conservative hold		Swing		

=== Rodbourne Cheney ===
Rodbourne Cheney (3 seats)
Party	Candidate	Votes	%	±%
Labour	Des Moffatt	1,663	61.5	N/A
Labour	James Patrick Grant	1,557	–	
Labour	Peter William David Watts	1,480	–	
Conservative	Harriet Katherine Maltby	846	31.3	N/A
Conservative	Oliver Donachie	845	–	
Conservative	Di Rodgers	776	–	
Liberal Democrats	Geoffrey King	193	7.1	N/A
Turnout		2,688	30.12	N/A
Registered electors		8,923		
Labour win (new seat)				
Labour win (new seat)				
Labour win (new seat)				

=== Shaw ===
Shaw (3 seats)
Party	Candidate	Votes	%	±%
Conservative	Keith Robert Williams	1,316	49.5	N/A
Conservative	Nick Martin	1,312	–	
Conservative	Garry Perkins	1,157	–	
Labour	Mike Heal	852	32.1	N/A
Labour	Andy Smart	739	–	
Labour	John Firmin	689	–	
Liberal Democrats	James Farr	296	11.1	N/A
Monster Raving Loony	Carl Morecroft	194	7.3	N/A
Turnout		2,432	28.71	N/A
Registered electors		8,472		
Conservative win (new seat)				
Conservative win (new seat)				
Conservative win (new seat)				

=== St Andrews ===
St Andrews (3 seats)
Party	Candidate	Votes	%	±%
Conservative	Vera Margaret Rose Tomlinson	1,209	62.9	N/A
Conservative	Peter Heaton-Jones	1,179	–	
Conservative	Mary Elizabeth Friend	1,079	–	
Labour	Amanda Jane Harrison	562	29.2	N/A
Labour	John Cyril William Sefton	485	–	
Labour	Paul Wright	450	–	
Liberal Democrats	Glyn Perrett	151	7.9	N/A
Turnout		1,890	24.44	N/A
Registered electors		7,734		
Conservative win (new seat)				
Conservative win (new seat)				
Conservative win (new seat)				

=== St Margaret and South Marston ===
St Margaret and South Marston (3 seats)
Party	Candidate	Votes	%	±%
Conservative	Russell Stephen Holland	1,409	45.7	N/A
Conservative	John Christopher Haines	1,174	–	
Conservative	Colin Peter Lovell	1,105	–	
Labour	Nigel Peter Chalk	1,009	32.7	N/A
Labour	John Foley	1,009	–	
Labour	Timothy Martin Page	941	–	
Green	Howard John March	437	14.2	N/A
Liberal Democrats	Victor Godman	229	7.4	N/A
Turnout		2,770	30.15	N/A
Registered electors		9,186		
Conservative win (new seat)				
Conservative win (new seat)				
Conservative win (new seat)				

=== Walcot and Park North ===
Walcot and Park North (3 seats)
Party	Candidate	Votes	%	±%
Labour	Steve Allsopp	1,504	48.0	N/A
Labour	Mark Dempsey	1,303	–	
Labour	Abdul Amin	1,274	–	
Conservative	Mavis Childs	596	19.6	N/A
Conservative	Sue Stephens	580	–	
Conservative	Dave Bell	577	–	
UKIP	Terry Hayward	392	12.5	N/A
Green	Jennifer Anne Miles	281	9.0	N/A
Liberal Democrats	Kathleen McCarthy	248	7.9	N/A
SDP	Steve Halden	112	3.6	N/A
SDP	Pavlos Chatzinopoulous	97	–	
Turnout		2,630	28.70	N/A
Registered electors		9,163		
Labour win (new seat)				
Labour win (new seat)				
Labour win (new seat)				

=== Wroughton and Wichelstowe ===
Wroughton and Wichelstowe (3 seats)
Party	Candidate	Votes	%	±%
Conservative	Brian Ford	1,028	31.9	N/A
Liberal Democrats	Ann Richards	909	28.2	N/A
Conservative	Wayne Lawrence Crabbe	847	–	
Conservative	Eric Shaw	711	–	
Independent	Paul Hurst	654	–	N/A
Labour	Ruairi Tobin	463	14.4	N/A
Labour	Mary Gladman	371	–	
Labour	Barrie Thompson	361	–	
Liberal Democrats	Garry Porter	433	–	
Liberal Democrats	David Pajak	380	–	
Independent	John Francis Newman	359	–	N/A
Green	Bob Heritage	167	5.2	N/A
Turnout		2,371	37.37	N/A
Registered electors		6,344		
Conservative win (new seat)				
Liberal Democrats win (new seat)				
Conservative win (new seat)				
