= St Andrews (Swindon ward) =

Former ward of Swindon Borough Council

- Former ward Swindon Borough Council
- Major settlements: Redhouse; St Andrews Ridge; Tadpole Garden Village

2012–2026
- Number of councillors: 3
- Replaced by: St Andrews East; St Andrews West and Tadpole
- Created from: Blunsdon
- UK Parliament constituency: Swindon North

St Andrews was an electoral ward in the Borough of Swindon, Wiltshire, England, which was contested from 2012 to 2024. It elected three councillors to Swindon Borough Council before it was abolished in 2026 and split into two wards: St Andrews East, and St Andrews West and Tadpole, which elect two councillors each.

== History ==
St Andrews ward was created in 2012; prior to this, St Andrews was part of the Blunsdon ward. The ward was abolished for the 2026 local elections.

== Geography ==
Most of the ward's coverage was suburbs of north Swindon in the St Andrews civil parish: namely Abbey Farm, Ash Brake, Eastbury, Groundwell West, Redhouse, St Andrews Ridge and Tadpole Garden Village. It was part of the Swindon North parliamentary constituency.

== Demographics ==
In the 2021 census, the population of the ward was 19,144.

== Councillors ==
Election	Councillors (3 seats)		
2012	Vera Tomlinson (Conservative)	Peter Heaton-Jones (Conservative)	Mary Friend (Conservative)
2014	Vera Tomlinson (Conservative)	Gemma McCracken (Conservative)	Mary Friend (Conservative)
2015	Vera Tomlinson (Conservative)	Gemma McCracken (Conservative)	Mary Friend (Conservative)
2016	Vera Tomlinson (Conservative)	Gemma McCracken (Conservative)	Mary Friend (Conservative)
2018	Vera Tomlinson (Conservative)	Rahul Tarar (Conservative)	Mary Friend (Conservative)
2019	Vera Tomlinson (Conservative)	Rahul Tarar (Conservative)	Steve Heyes (Conservative)
2021	Daniel Adams (Conservative)	Rahul Tarar (Conservative)	Steve Heyes (Conservative)
2022	Daniel Adams (Conservative)	Jake Chandler (Conservative)	Steve Heyes (Conservative)
2023	Daniel Adams (Conservative)	Jake Chandler (Conservative)	Jason Mills (Labour)
2024	Daniel Adams (Conservative)	Jake Chandler (Conservative)	Jason Mills (Labour)
2026	Ward abolished (see St Andrews East and St Andrews West and Tadpole)		

== Election results ==
2024 Swindon Borough Council election: St Andrews (1 seat)
Party	Candidate	Votes	%	±%
Conservative	Daniel Adams	1,642	45.0	+10.4
Labour	Josh Wood	1,490	40.9	+0.5
Green	Howard March	311	8.5	−13.5
Liberal Democrats	Dawn Pajak	191	5.2	+2.1
Majority		152	4.2	
Turnout		3,647	28.4	–1.4
Registered electors		12,845		
Conservative hold		Swing	▲5.0	

2023 Swindon Borough Council election: St Andrews (1 seat)
Party	Candidate	Votes	%	±%
Labour	Jason Mills	1,525	40.4	+5.6
Conservative	Steve Heyes	1,305	34.6	−7.6
Green	Bradley Williams	829	22.0	−1.0
Liberal Democrats	Ebad Syed	117	3.1	N/A
Majority		220	5.8	N/A
Turnout		3,791	29.75	
Registered electors		12,741		
Labour gain from Conservative				

2022 Swindon Borough Council election: St Andrews (1 seat)
Party	Candidate	Votes	%	±%
Conservative	Jake Edward Chandler	1,390	42.2	−11.82
Labour	Jason John Mills	1,147	34.8	+4.89
Green	Bradley Martyn Williams	757	23.0	+16.48
Majority		243	7.4	
Turnout		3,302	26.31	
Registered electors		12,552		
Conservative hold		Swing		

2021 Swindon Borough Council election: St Andrews (1 seat)
Party	Candidate	Votes	%	±%
Conservative	Daniel Adams	2,078	55.47	+3.7
Labour	Jason Mills	936	24.99	−1.5
Green	Bradley Williams	555	14.82	−6.9
Independent	Beverly Elmer	153	4.08	n/a
Majority		1,142	30.49	+5.2
Turnout		3,746	30.58	+3.6
Conservative hold		Swing	+2.6	

2019 Swindon Borough Council election: St Andrews (1 seat)
Party	Candidate	Votes	%	±%
Conservative	Steve Hayes	1,476	51.8	−3.0
Labour	Thomas Craigie	754	26.5	−2.9
Green	Steven Pipe	617	21.7	+15.3
Majority		722	25.3	
Turnout		2,847	27.0	
Conservative hold		Swing		

2018 Swindon Borough Council election: St Andrews (1 seat)
Party	Candidate	Votes	%	±%
Conservative	Rahul Tarar	1,596	54.83	+ 1.82
Labour	Jason Mills	856	29.41	+ 6.55
Green	Flora Wilkins	186	6.39	+ 6.39
Liberal Democrats	Garry Porter	176	6.05	− 1.78
UKIP	Terence Hayward	97	3.33	− 15.84
Turnout		2,920	29.47	
Registered electors		9,910		
Conservative hold		Swing		

2016 Swindon Borough Council election: St Andrews (1 seat)
Party	Candidate	Votes	%	±%
Conservative	Vera Tomlinson	1,360	59.83	
Labour	Maura Clarke	519	22.83	
UKIP	Susan Short	249	10.95	
Liberal Democrats	Deborah King	145	6.38	
Majority		841	37.0	
Turnout		2273	29	
Conservative hold		Swing		

2015 Swindon Borough Council election: St Andrews (1 seat)
Party	Candidate	Votes	%	±%
Conservative	Mary Elizabeth Friend *	2,962	58.2	+6.7
Labour	Jason John Mills	1,044	20.5	–1.7
UKIP	Brian Stone	618	12.1	–6.5
Liberal Democrats	Geoff King	215	4.2	–3.4
Majority		1,918	37.8	N/A
Turnout		5,091	62.38	+35.02
Registered electors		8,161		
Conservative hold		Swing		

2014 Swindon Borough Council election: St Andrews (2 seats)
Party	Candidate	Votes	%	±%
Conservative	Gemma McCracken	1,164	51.5	–11.4
Conservative	Mary Friend *	1,124	–	
Labour	Jason Mills	502	22.2	–7.0
Labour	John Keepin	491	–	
UKIP	Gary Belben	421	18.6	N/A
UKIP	Anthony Garrett	405	–	
Liberal Democrats	Margaret Mistry	172	7.6	–0.3
Turnout		2,196	27.36	+2.92
Registered electors		8,027		
Conservative hold		Swing		
Conservative hold		Swing		

An extra second seat was up for election than normally would have been due to the resignation of Peter Heaton-Jones.

2012 Swindon Borough Council election: St Andrews (3 seats)
Party	Candidate	Votes	%	±%
Conservative	Vera Margaret Rose Tomlinson	1,209	62.9	N/A
Conservative	Peter Heaton-Jones	1,179	–	
Conservative	Mary Elizabeth Friend	1,079	–	
Labour	Amanda Jane Harrison	562	29.2	N/A
Labour	John Cyril William Sefton	485	–	
Labour	Paul Wright	450	–	
Liberal Democrats	Glyn Perrett	151	7.9	N/A
Turnout		1,890	24.44	N/A
Registered electors		7,734		
Conservative win (new seat)				
Conservative win (new seat)				
Conservative win (new seat)				

== See also ==
- List of electoral divisions and wards in Wiltshire
