= Wroughton and Wichelstowe (ward) =

Ward in Swindon, Wiltshire

- ward Swindon Borough Council
- Major settlements: Wichelstowe; Wroughton

Current ward
- Created: 2012
- Councillor: Matty Courtliff (Conservative)
- Councillor: Martin Barrett (Liberal Democrats)
- Councillor: Gayle Cook (Conservative)
- Number of councillors: 3
- Created from: Wroughton and Chiseldon
- UK Parliament constituency: East Wiltshire

Wroughton and Wichelstowe is an electoral ward in the Borough of Swindon, Wiltshire, England. Since 2012, the ward has elected three councillors to Swindon Borough Council. The ward straddles the M4 motorway, covering its namesakes either side: the large village of Wroughton on the south, and the more modern suburb of Wichelstowe on the north.

== Area profile ==
The ward covers the whole of Wroughton, as well as the Middle Wichel and West Wichel quarters of Wichelstowe. East Wichel lies in the separate ward of Old Town and Lawn. Other areas in the ward include the neighbourhoods of Alexandra Park, Langton Park and Thorney Park, and the hamlets of Elcombe and Overtown.

The ward is the third largest in the Borough of Swindon; it also covers a large rural area to the south and west of Wroughton. For general elections, has been part of the East Wiltshire constituency since 2024; prior to boundary changes, it was part of Swindon South.

As of 2026, the ward has Swindon's sole Liberal Democrat councillor.

== Demographics ==
In the 2021 census, the population of the ward was 8,229.

== Councillors ==
| Election | Councillors (3 seats) | | |
|---|---|---|---|
| 2012 | Brian Ford (Conservative) | Ann Richards (Liberal Democrats) | Wayne Crabbe (Conservative) |
| 2014 | Brian Ford (Conservative) | Ann Richards (Liberal Democrats) | Wayne Crabbe (Conservative) |
| 2015 | Brian Ford (Conservative) | Cathy Martyn (Conservative) | Wayne Crabbe (Conservative) |
| 2016 | Brian Ford (Conservative) | Cathy Martyn (Conservative) | Wayne Crabbe (Conservative) |
| 2018 | Brian Ford (Conservative) | Cathy Martyn (Conservative) | Andy Spry (Liberal Democrats) |
| 2019 | Brian Ford (Conservative) | Cathy Martyn (Conservative) | Andy Spry (Liberal Democrats) |
| 2021 | Brian Ford (Conservative) | Cathy Martyn (Conservative) | David Martyn (Conservative) |
| 2022 | Brian Ford (Conservative) | Cathy Martyn (Conservative) | David Martyn (Conservative) |
| Jan 2023 | Brian Ford (Conservative) | Vacant | David Martyn (Conservative) |
| 2023 | Brian Ford (Conservative) | Adam Poole (Liberal Democrats) | David Martyn (Conservative) |
| Mar 2024 | Brian Ford (Conservative) | Adam Poole (Liberal Democrats) | Vacant |
| 2024 | Matty Courtliff (Conservative) | Adam Poole (Liberal Democrats) | Gayle Cook (Conservative) |
| 2026 | Matty Courtliff (Conservative) | Martin Barrett (Liberal Democrats) | Gayle Cook (Conservative) |

== Election results ==
2026 Swindon Borough Council election: Wroughton and Wichelstowe (3 seats)
| Party | Candidate | Votes | % | ±% |
|---|---|---|---|---|
| Conservative | Matty Courtliff* | 1,234 | 34.7 | –3.8 |
| Liberal Democrats | Martin Barrett | 1,203 | 33.9 | +3.3 |
| Conservative | Gayle Cook* | 1,107 | 31.2 | –7.3 |
| Liberal Democrats | Stan Pajak | 1,085 | 30.5 | –0.1 |
| Conservative | Matthew Smith | 1,046 | 29.4 | –9.1 |
| Liberal Democrats | Ela Maksudova | 876 | 24.7 | –5.9 |
| Reform | Thomas Marshall | 872 | 24.5 | N/A |
| Reform | Ben Michalek | 808 | 22.7 | N/A |
| Reform | Geoff Thompson | 794 | 22.3 | N/A |
| Green | Robbie Easter | 403 | 11.3 | –3.9 |
| Green | Artemis Pink | 359 | 10.1 | –5.1 |
| Labour | Sam James | 349 | 9.8 | –5.9 |
| Labour | Peter Kramer | 290 | 8.2 | –7.5 |
| Labour | Victor Onyia | 232 | 6.5 | –9.2 |
| Turnout | | 3,748 | 49.1 | +14.2 |
| Registered electors | | 7,635 | | |
| Conservative hold | | | | |
| Liberal Democrats hold | | | | |
| Conservative hold | | | | |

2024 Swindon Borough Council election: Wroughton and Wichelstowe (2 seats)
| Party | Candidate | Votes | % | ±% |
|---|---|---|---|---|
| Conservative | Matty Courtliff | 1,026 | 42.3 | +7.6 |
| Conservative | Gayle Cook | 884 | 36.4 | +1.7 |
| Liberal Democrats | Martin Barrett | 816 | 33.6 | −2.0 |
| Liberal Democrats | Stan Pajak | 643 | 26.5 | −9.1 |
| Labour | Saleh Ahmed | 417 | 17.2 | −2.2 |
| Green | Simon Fairbourn | 405 | 16.7 | +6.4 |
| Labour | Abdul Hamid | 332 | 13.7 | −5.7 |
| Turnout | | 2,427 | 34.9 | –2.3 |
| Registered electors | | 6,950 | | |
| Conservative hold | | | | |
| Conservative gain from Independent | | | | |

An extra seat was up for election than normally would have been due to the resignation of David Martyn on 21 March 2024.

2023 Swindon Borough Council election: Wroughton and Wichelstowe
| Party | Candidate | Votes | % | ±% |
|---|---|---|---|---|
| Liberal Democrats | Adam Poole | 874 | 35.6 | +6.1 |
| Conservative | Gayle Cook | 854 | 34.7 | −10.8 |
| Labour | Saleh Ahmed | 477 | 19.4 | +4.1 |
| Green | Pippa Fairbourn | 253 | 10.3 | +0.7 |
| Majority | | 20 | | |
| Turnout | | 2,475 | 37.21 | |
| Registered electors | | 6,651 | | |
| Liberal Democrats gain from Conservative | | | | |

2022 Swindon Borough Council election: Wroughton and Wichelstowe
| Party | Candidate | Votes | % | ±% |
|---|---|---|---|---|
| Conservative | David Martyn | 1,134 | 45.5 | +9.68 |
| Liberal Democrats | Adam Poole | 734 | 29.5 | −6.63 |
| Labour | Sam James | 382 | 15.3 | +1.87 |
| Green | Pippa Fairbourn | 240 | 9.6 | |
| Majority | | 400 | 16.1 | |
| Turnout | | 2,500 | 38.15 | |
| Registered electors | | 6,553 | | |
| Conservative hold | | Swing | | |

2021 Swindon Borough Council election: Wroughton and Wichelstowe (2 seats)
| Party | Candidate | Votes | % | ±% |
|---|---|---|---|---|
| Conservative | Brian Ford | 1,547 | 52.00 | +3.8 |
| Conservative | David Martyn | 1,335 | 44.87 | |
| Liberal Democrats | Martin Barrett | 858 | 28.84 | −0.9 |
| Liberal Democrats | Adam Poole | 735 | 24.71 | |
| Green | Pippa Fairbourn | 341 | 11.46 | +2.9 |
| Labour | Md Hamid | 257 | 8.64 | −0.4 |
| Green | Simon Fairbourn | 206 | 6.92 | |
| Labour | Zohaib Tariq | 195 | 6.55 | |
| Independent | Shanti Mabberley | 46 | 1.55 | n/a |
| Majority | | 477 | 16.03 | −0.5 |
| Turnout | | 2,975 | 46.51 | +4.0 |
| Conservative hold | | Swing | +2.4 | |
| Conservative gain from Liberal Democrats | | Swing | | |

2019 Swindon Borough Council election: Wroughton and Wichelstowe
| Party | Candidate | Votes | % | ±% |
|---|---|---|---|---|
| Conservative | Cathy Martyn | 1,193 | 46.2 | +10.3 |
| Liberal Democrats | Jamie Taylor | 768 | 29.7 | −6.4 |
| Labour | Sam James | 233 | 9.0 | −4.5 |
| Green | Andrew Francis | 222 | 8.6 | −3.1 |
| UKIP | Lincoln Williams | 167 | 6.5 | +3.7 |
| Majority | | 425 | 16.5 | |
| Turnout | | 2,583 | 42.5 | |
| Conservative hold | | Swing | | |

2018 Swindon Borough Council election: Wroughton and Wichelstowe
| Party | Candidate | Votes | % | ±% |
|---|---|---|---|---|
| Liberal Democrats | Andy Spry | 1,005 | 36.1 | +17.4 |
| Conservative | Wayne Lawrence Crabbe * | 998 | 35.9 | +2.8 |
| Labour | Sam James | 375 | 13.5 | –0.3 |
| Green | Talis Kimberley-Fairbourn | 326 | 11.7 | +1.0 |
| UKIP | Lincoln Vincent Williams | 79 | 2.8 | –15.6 |
| Majority | | 7 | 0.3 | N/A |
| Turnout | | 2,789 | 45.13 | |
| Registered electors | | 6,180 | | |
| Liberal Democrats gain from Conservative | | Swing | | |

2016 Swindon Borough Council election: Wroughton and Wichelstowe
| Party | Candidate | Votes | % | ±% |
|---|---|---|---|---|
| Conservative | Brian Ford | 1,212 | 54.62 | |
| Green | Talis Kimberley-Fairbourn | 326 | 14.69 | |
| Labour | Imtiyaz Shaikh | 305 | 13.74 | |
| UKIP | Malcolm Jefferies | 258 | 11.63 | |
| Liberal Democrats | Christopher Shepherd | 118 | 5.31 | |
| Majority | | 886 | 39.93 | |
| Turnout | | 2219 | 38 | |
| Conservative hold | | Swing | | |

2015 Swindon Borough Council election: Wroughton and Wichelstowe
| Party | Candidate | Votes | % | ±% |
|---|---|---|---|---|
| Conservative | Cathy Martyn | 1,797 | 39.3 | +6.0 |
| Liberal Democrats | Ann Richards * | 1,184 | 25.9 | +7.1 |
| Labour | Cheryl Lewis | 733 | 16.0 | +2.2 |
| UKIP | Susan Short | 546 | 11.9 | –6.6 |
| Green | Chantelle Amy Smith | 194 | 4.2 | –6.6 |
| Independent | John Francis Newman | 116 | 2.5 | –2.3 |
| Majority | | 613 | 13.5 | –1.0 |
| Turnout | | 4,570 | 72.15 | –31.07 |
| Registered electors | | 6,334 | | |
| Conservative gain from Liberal Democrats | | Swing | | |

2014 Swindon Borough Council election: Wroughton and Wichelstowe
| Party | Candidate | Votes | % | ±% |
|---|---|---|---|---|
| Conservative | Wayne Crabbe * | 867 | 33.3 | +1.4 |
| Liberal Democrats | Georgina Akers | 490 | 18.8 | –9.4 |
| UKIP | Susan Short | 483 | 18.5 | N/A |
| Labour | Paul Dixon | 360 | 13.8 | –0.6 |
| Green | Talis Kimberley-Fairbourn | 281 | 10.8 | +5.6 |
| Independent | John Newman | 124 | 4.8 | N/A |
| Majority | | 377 | 14.5 | N/A |
| Turnout | | 2,620 | 41.08 | +3.71 |
| Registered electors | | 6,378 | | |
| Conservative hold | | Swing | | |

2012 Swindon Borough Council election: Wroughton and Wichelstowe (3 seats)
| Party | Candidate | Votes | % | ±% |
|---|---|---|---|---|
| Conservative | Brian Ford | 1,028 | 31.9 | N/A |
| Liberal Democrats | Ann Richards | 909 | 28.2 | N/A |
| Conservative | Wayne Crabbe | 847 | – | |
| Conservative | Eric Shaw | 711 | – | |
| Independent | Paul Hurst | 654 | – | N/A |
| Labour | Ruairi Tobin | 463 | 14.4 | N/A |
| Labour | Mary Gladman | 371 | – | |
| Labour | Barrie Thompson | 361 | – | |
| Liberal Democrats | Garry Porter | 433 | – | |
| Liberal Democrats | David Pajak | 380 | – | |
| Independent | John Francis Newman | 359 | – | N/A |
| Green | Bob Heritage | 167 | 5.2 | N/A |
| Turnout | | 2,371 | 37.37 | N/A |
| Registered electors | | 6,344 | | |
| Conservative win (new seat) | | | | |
| Liberal Democrats win (new seat) | | | | |
| Conservative win (new seat) | | | | |

== See also ==
- List of electoral divisions and wards in Wiltshire
