= Central (Swindon ward) =

Ward in Swindon, Wiltshire

- Former ward Thamesdown Borough Council (1976–1997); Swindon Borough Council (1997–2026)
- Major settlements: Swindon Town Centre; Kingshill

1976–2026
- Number of councillors: 3
- Replaced by: Queen's Park; Kingshill
- UK Parliament constituency: Swindon South

Central was an electoral ward in Swindon, Wiltshire, England, which elected three councillors to Swindon Borough Council, previously Thamesdown Borough Council, from 1976 to 2026. In 1998, it was contested under Swindon Borough Council for the first time. In 2026, it was replaced in large part by the Queen's Park ward as part of boundary changes.

== Area profile ==
Central ward covered inner areas of Swindon and was bounded by the Great Western Main Line to the northwest. It included much of the town centre, Kingshill, Broadgreen, and a section taking in the Shrivenham Road area towards Greenbridge, using the South Swindon civil parish boundary as its border. It was considered a stronghold for the Labour Party.

== Demographics ==
In the 2021 census, the population of the ward was 15,425.

== Councillors ==
Election	Councillors		
2007	Derique Montaut (Labour)		
2008	Derique Montaut (Labour)	Junab Ali (Labour)	
2010	Derique Montaut (Labour)	Junab Ali (Labour)	Bob Wright (Labour)
2011	Derique Montaut (Labour)	Junab Ali (Labour)	Bob Wright (Labour)
2012	Julie Wright (Labour)	Junab Ali (Labour)	Bob Wright (Labour)
2014	Julie Wright (Labour)	Junab Ali (Labour)	Bob Wright (Labour)
2015	Julie Wright (Labour)	Junab Ali (Labour)	Bob Wright (Labour)
2016	Julie Wright (Labour)	Junab Ali (Labour)	Bob Wright (Labour)
2018	Julie Wright (Labour)	Junab Ali (Labour)	Bob Wright (Labour)
2019	Adorabelle Amaral-Shaikh (Labour)	Junab Ali (Labour)	Bob Wright (Labour)
2021	Adorabelle Amaral-Shaikh (Labour)	Junab Ali (Labour)	Lourenco Fernandes (Conservative)
2022	Adorabelle Amaral-Shaikh (Labour)	Anabelle Patricia Pegado (Conservative)	Lourenco Fernandes (Conservative)
2023	Adorabelle Amaral-Shaikh (Labour)	Anabelle Patricia Pegado (Conservative)	Lourenco Fernandes (Conservative)
2024	Adorabelle Amaral-Shaikh (Labour)	Anabelle Patricia Pegado (Conservative)	Domingos Dias (Labour)
2026	Ward abolished (see Queen's Park and Kingshill)		

== Election results ==
2024 Swindon Borough Council election: Central
Party	Candidate	Votes	%	±%
Labour	Domingos Dias	2,117	52.6	−9.2
Conservative	Lourenco Fernandes*	838	20.8	−12.1
Independent	Vintur Fernandes	718	17.8	N/A
Liberal Democrats	Marek Sarnowski	195	4.8	+1.1
TUSC	Mary Quate	124	3.1	N/A
Majority		1,279	31.8	
Turnout		4,027	39.6	–1.4
Registered electors		10,158		
Labour gain from Conservative		Swing	▲1.5	

2023 Swindon Borough Council election: Central
Party	Candidate	Votes	%	±%
Labour	Adorabelle Amaral-Shaikh*	2,960	61.8	+16.9
Conservative	John Barreto	1,577	32.9	−16.2
Liberal Democrats	Hannah Pajak	177	3.7	−2.1
Independent	Mariano Rodrigues	73	1.5	N/A
Majority		1,383		
Turnout		4,813	46.96	
Registered electors		10,249		
Labour hold		Swing		

2022 Swindon Borough Council election: Central
Party	Candidate	Votes	%	±%
Conservative	Anabelle Patricia Pegado	1,983	49.1	+31.96
Labour Co-op	Junab Ali *	1,813	44.9	−26.60
Liberal Democrats	Hannah Louise Pajak	236	5.8	+0.67
Majority		170	4.2	N/A
Turnout		4,066	40.92	
Registered electors		9,937		
Conservative gain from Labour Co-op		Swing		

2021 Swindon Borough Council election: Central
Party	Candidate	Votes	%	±%
Conservative	Lourenco Fernandes	2,230	51.45	+36.8
Labour	Rajhia Ali	1,603	36.99	−31.0
Liberal Democrats	Garry Porter	242	5.58	−4.0
Independent	Helen Dunn	193	4.45	n/a
Majority		627	14.47	
Turnout		4,334	44.42	+3.6
Conservative gain from Labour		Swing	+33.9	

2019 Swindon Borough Council election: Central
Party	Candidate	Votes	%	±%
Labour	Adorabelle Shaikh	2,454	67.9	−3.7
Conservative	Mohammad Chowdhury	531	14.7	−2.5
Liberal Democrats	Raymond James	348	9.6	+4.4
Green	Bob Heritage	283	7.8	+4.2
Majority		1,923	53.2	
Turnout		3,616	38.8	
Labour hold		Swing		

2018 Swindon Borough Council election: Central
Party	Candidate	Votes	%	±%
Labour	Junab Ali*	3,141	71.31	+ 33.71
Conservative	David Bell	752	17.07	+ 3.73
Liberal Democrats	Ray James	227	5.15	− 27.11
Green	Robert Heritage	147	3.34	+ 3.34
UKIP	Jason Costello	117	2.66	− 9.66
Turnout		4,405	45.91	
Registered electors		9,594		
Labour hold		Swing		

2016 Swindon Borough Council election: Central
Party	Candidate	Votes	%	±%
Labour	Robert Stanley Wright*	2,459	74.4	
Conservative	Jack Lindsey Howard	554	16.8	
Liberal Democrats	Ann Richards	291	8.8	
Majority		1905	57.6	
Turnout		3,304	39	
Labour hold		Swing		

2015 Swindon Borough Council election: Central
Party	Candidate	Votes	%	±%
Labour	Julie Wright *	2,567	45.1	+7.1
Conservative	Dave Bell	1,187	20.8	+7.2
Liberal Democrats	Antonio Banjamino Lopes	1,176	20.6	–12.0
UKIP	Bob Sheppard	499	8.8	–3.6
Green	Adam Grizzly Wilkinson-Moore	218	3.8	N/A
Independent	Karsten Evans	48	0.8	N/A
Majority		1,380	24.4	+19.0
Turnout		5,695	58.87	+19.15
Registered electors		9,674		
Labour hold		Swing		

2014 Swindon Borough Council election: Central
Party	Candidate	Votes	%	±%
Labour	Junab Ali*	1,386	38.0	–32.1
Liberal Democrats	Imtiyaz Shaikh	1,189	32.6	+25.4
Conservative	Timothy Michael French	495	13.6	+0.8
UKIP	Brian David Stone	454	12.4	N/A
Independent	Nicholas Gary Kearns	127	3.5	N/A
Majority		197	5.4	N/A
Turnout		3,686	39.72	+8.72
Registered electors		9,281		
Labour hold		Swing		

2012 Swindon Borough Council election: Central (3 seats)
Party	Candidate	Votes	%	±%
Labour	Bob Wright	1,947	70.1	+5.2
Labour	Julie Wright	1,899	–	
Labour	Junab Ali	1,788	–	
Conservative	Tim French	356	12.8	–3.9
Conservative	Jaki Dawn Fairbrother	341	–	
Conservative	Kashif Khan	276	–	
Green	Simon Smith	273	9.8	+4.3
Liberal Democrats	Joan Mortimer	200	7.2	–0.4
Liberal Democrats	Christopher Robert Shepherd	164	–	
Liberal Democrats	John Williams	159	–	
Turnout		2,784	31.00	–3.28
Registered electors		8,981		
Labour hold		Swing		
Labour hold		Swing		
Labour hold		Swing		

2011 Swindon Borough Council election: Central
Party	Candidate	Votes	%	±%
Labour	Derique Montaut	1,829	64.9	+12.1
Conservative	Paul Gregory	471	16.7	−9.2
Liberal Democrats	Gary Porter	213	7.6	−7.5
Green	Robert Heritage	155	5.5	+2.5
UKIP	Eleanor Pomagalski	95	3.4	+3.4
Independent	Karsten Evans	55	2.0	+0.7
Majority		1,358	48.2	+21.3
Turnout		2,818	34.3	
Labour hold		Swing	+10.6	

2010 Swindon Borough Council election: Central
Party	Candidate	Votes	%	±%
Labour	Robert Wright	2,357	52.8	+8.7
Conservative	Kevin Leakey	1,155	25.9	−6.6
Liberal Democrats	Kathryn Spencer	673	15.1	+4.1
Green	Stephen Chadfield	136	3.0	+3.0
Independent	David Cox	84	1.9	−4.2
Independent	Karsten Evans	60	1.3	+1.3
Majority		1,202	26.9	+15.3
Turnout		4,465		
Labour hold		Swing		

2008 Swindon Borough Council election: Central
Party	Candidate	Votes	%	±%
Labour	Junab Ali	902	44.1	−3.0
Conservative	Kevin Leakey	664	32.5	+3.9
Liberal Democrats	Hannah Pajak	224	11.0	−2.0
UKIP	Eric Bagwell	130	6.4	+6.4
Independent	David Cox	125	6.1	+1.6
Majority		238	11.6	−6.9
Turnout		2,045		
Labour gain from Conservative		Swing		

2007 Swindon Borough Council election: Central
Party	Candidate	Votes	%	±%
Labour	Derique Montaut	1,092	47.1	+0.6
Conservative	Karen Leakey	663	28.6	−1.1
Liberal Democrats	Steven Pipe	301	13.0	−1.7
Green	Karsten Evans	156	6.7	+0.3
Independent	David Cox	105	4.5	+1.9
Majority		429	18.5	+1.7
Turnout		2,317	30.9	
Labour gain from Conservative		Swing	+0.8%	

2006 Swindon Borough Council election: Central
Party	Candidate	Votes	%	±%
Labour	Robert Wright	1,005	46.5	+3.9
Conservative	K Leakey	642	29.7	+4.1
Liberal Democrats	H Thompson	317	14.7	−4.7
Green	K Evans	139	6.4	−2.2
Independent	D Rowland	56	2.6	+2.6
Majority		363	16.8	−0.2
Turnout		2,159		
Labour hold		Swing		

2004 Swindon Borough Council election: Central
Party	Candidate	Votes	%	±%
Labour	Sinead Darker	796	42.6	+5.0
Conservative	Matthew McCue	479	25.6	+8.1
Liberal Democrats	Tel Hudson	363	19.4	−19.2
Green	Karsten Evans	161	8.6	+8.6
Socialist Alliance	Andrew Newman	69	3.7	+3.7
Majority		317	17.0	
Turnout		1,868		

2004 Central by-election
Party	Candidate	Votes	%	±%
Labour	Sinead Darker	513	37.9	+0.3
Liberal Democrats		359	26.5	−12.1
Conservative	Roderick Bluh	229	16.9	−0.6
SA		119	8.8	+8.8
Green		71	5.2	+5.2
SOU		41	3.0	−3.2
UKIP		21	1.6	+1.6
Majority		154	11.4	
Turnout		1,353	19.4	
Labour hold		Swing		

A by-election for the Central ward took place on 22 January 2004 due to the resignation of incumbent councillor John Taylor.

2003 Swindon Borough Council election: Central
Party	Candidate	Votes	%	±%
Liberal Democrats	Michael Dickinson	632	38.6	+3.9
Labour	David Cox	616	37.6	−4.3
Conservative	Olive Clapham	287	17.5	+0.9
Swindon Org UK People Before Profit	Karsten Evans	102	6.2	+6.2
Majority		16	1.0	
Turnout		1,637	23.1	−2.3
Liberal Democrats gain from Labour		Swing		

2002 Swindon Borough Council election: Central
Party	Candidate	Votes	%	±%
Labour	David Nash	758	41.9	
Liberal Democrats	Michael Dickinson	628	34.7	
Conservative	Peter Bates	300	16.6	
Green	Simon Smith	85	4.7	
Rock 'n' Roll Loony	John Stuart	37	2.0	
Majority		130	7.2	
Turnout		1,808	25.4	
Labour hold		Swing		

1997 Central by-election
Party	Candidate	Votes	%	±%
Labour		548	46.3	
Liberal Democrats		300	25.3	
Conservative		224	18.9	
Green		69	5.8	
Socialist Labour		44	53.7.8	
Majority		248	21.0	
Turnout		1,185	20.7	
Labour hold		Swing		

A by-election for the Central ward took place on 15 May 1997.

== See also ==
- List of electoral divisions and wards in Wiltshire
