= 2007 Swindon Borough Council election =

UK local government election

Map of the results of the 2007 Swindon council election. Conservatives in blue, Labour in red and Liberal Democrat in orange. Wards in grey were not contested in 2007.

The 2007 Swindon Borough Council election took place on 4 May 2007 to elect members of Swindon Unitary Council in Wiltshire, England. One third of the council was up for election and the Conservative Party stayed in overall control of the council.

After the election, the composition of the council was:

- Conservative 43
- Labour 13
- Liberal Democrat 3

== Campaign ==
92 candidates were contesting 21 seats with 2 seats available in Haydon Wick wards. Both Conservative and Labour parties contested every seat, while the Liberal Democrats had 20 candidates. Other political parties contesting the election included the Green Party with 16 candidates, United Kingdom Independence Party with 7 and the British National Party with 3.

Issues in the election included regeneration of the town, affordable housing, crime and preserving green space. The Conservative council's plans to move to fortnightly rubbish collection were also criticised by the Labour Party.

For the election voters were able to cast their vote at any polling station or library instead of just their polling station, as well as internet and text voting being available. The vote count was also done electronically, however problems at a few polling stations meant some votes had to be checked manually. This meant the election count was 2 hours later than expected, with overall turnout in the election being 33.8%.

== Election result ==
The results saw the Conservatives stay in control of the council with 43 seats, compared to 13 for Labour and 3 Liberal Democrats. Both the Conservative and Labour parties made 2 gains, with each party taking 1 seat from the other. The Conservatives gained Moredon from Labour, while Labour took a seat back in Central ward. Both parties also gained a seat from an independent, with the Conservatives taking Freshbrook and Grange Park, while Labour took Penhill. Elsewhere Conservative candidates held on by small majorities of 36 and 45 over Labour in St Philip and Walcot wards respectively.

Swindon local election result 2007
Party	Seats	Gains	Losses	Net gain/loss	Seats %	Votes %	Votes	+/−
Conservative	15	2	1	+1	71.4	46.8	23,429	-0.8
Labour	5	2	1	+1	23.8	28.9	14,458	-1.3
Liberal Democrats	1	0	0	0	4.8	13.2	6,635	-0.9
Green	0	0	0	0	0.0	5.9	2,946	+0.1
UKIP	0	0	0	0	0.0	3.7	1,875	+3.7
BNP	0	0	0	0	0.0	1.2	597	+0.5
Independent	0	0	2	-2	0.0	0.3	165	-0.7

== Ward results ==
Abbey Meads
Party	Candidate	Votes	%	±%
Conservative	Peter Stoddart	1,639	69.3	−1.1
Labour	Ian Carroll	375	15.9	+2.1
Liberal Democrats	Richard Law	204	8.6	+0.2
Green	Richard Uzzell	146	6.2	−1.2
Majority		1,264	53.5	−3.1
Turnout		2,364	26.8	
Conservative hold		Swing	-1.6%	

Central
Party	Candidate	Votes	%	±%
Labour	Derique Montaut	1,092	47.1	+0.6
Conservative	Karen Leakey	663	28.6	−1.1
Liberal Democrats	Steven Pipe	301	13.0	−1.7
Green	Karsten Evans	156	6.7	+0.3
Independent	David Cox	105	4.5	+1.9
Majority		429	18.5	+1.7
Turnout		2,317	30.9	
Labour gain from Conservative		Swing	+0.8%	

Covingham and Nythe
Party	Candidate	Votes	%	±%
Conservative	Glenn Smith	1,497	54.2	−3.3
Labour	Maureen Dilley	743	26.9	−15.6
UKIP	Cynthia Desmond	323	11.7	+11.7
Liberal Democrats	David Pajak	199	7.2	+7.2
Majority		754	27.3	+12.2
Turnout		2,762	40.8	
Conservative hold		Swing	+6.1%	

Dorcan
Party	Candidate	Votes	%	±%
Conservative	Andy Albinson	1,384	57.6	+8.5
Labour	Sally Lee	718	29.9	−0.5
Green	Daniel Fraser	301	12.5	+4.0
Majority		666	27.7	+9.1
Turnout		2,403	35.5	
Conservative hold		Swing	+4.5%	

Eastcott
Party	Candidate	Votes	%	±%
Liberal Democrats	Martin Wiltshire	879	39.6	−9.3
Conservative	Paul Gregory	551	24.9	+5.2
Labour	Sarah Bush	526	23.7	+3.0
Green	Bill Hughes	261	11.8	+1.1
Majority		328	14.8	−13.4
Turnout		2,217	29.6	
Liberal Democrats hold		Swing	-7.2%	

Freshbrook and Grange Park
Party	Candidate	Votes	%	±%
Conservative	Michael Dickinson	1,152	49.0	+3.8
Liberal Democrats	Judith Peppitt	669	28.5	−5.0
Labour	Carol Heavens	393	16.7	+2.1
Green	Jim Santaniello	136	5.8	−0.9
Majority		483	20.6	+8.9
Turnout		2,350	31.2	
Conservative gain from Independent		Swing	+4.4%	

Gorse Hill and Pinehurst
Party	Candidate	Votes	%	±%
Labour	John Ballman	850	44.8	+3.5
Conservative	Louise Gallavin	485	25.6	+4.5
BNP	Reg Bates	212	11.2	−4.8
Liberal Democrats	Les Wood	154	8.1	−0.4
UKIP	Robin Tingey	104	5.5	+5.5
Green	Neil Gutteridge	91	4.8	+4.8
Majority		365	19.3	−0.9
Turnout		1,896	27.8	
Labour hold		Swing	-1.0%	

Haydon Wick (2)
Party	Candidate	Votes	%	±%
Conservative	Ian Dobie	1,320		
Conservative	Rex Barnett	1,299		
Labour	John Keepin	651		
Labour	Mark Dempsey	614		
Green	Emma Bushell	298		
UKIP	Michael Stuckey	270		
Liberal Democrats	Ann Morgan	252		
Liberal Democrats	Andrew Sharp	227		
Turnout		4,931	34.8	
Conservative hold		Swing		
Conservative hold		Swing		

Highworth
Party	Candidate	Votes	%	±%
Conservative	Melanie Duff	1,492	56.8	+2.0
Labour	Gerald Edwards	696	26.5	−0.1
Green	Andy Day	257	9.8	−1.1
Liberal Democrats	Hannah Pajak	184	7.0	−0.8
Majority		796	30.3	+2.1
Turnout		2,629	40.5	
Conservative hold		Swing	+1.0%	

Moredon
Party	Candidate	Votes	%	±%
Conservative	Stephanie Exell	1,187	47.7	+2.7
Labour	Maureen Caton	885	35.6	−7.8
UKIP	Kathleen Webb	218	8.8	+8.8
Liberal Democrats	Heidi Teague	197	7.9	−3.7
Majority		302	12.1	+10.5
Turnout		2,487	33.7	
Conservative gain from Labour		Swing	+5.2%	

Old Town and Lawn
Party	Candidate	Votes	%	±%
Conservative	Fionuala Foley	2,044	58.7	+0.1
Liberal Democrats	Mark Wheaver	543	15.6	−1.4
Labour	Cindy Matthews	468	13.4	−0.9
Green	Christine Smith	245	7.0	−3.1
UKIP	Terrence Hayward	180	5.2	+5.2
Majority		1,501	43.1	+1.5
Turnout		3,480	43.8	
Conservative hold		Swing	+0.8%	

Parks
Party	Candidate	Votes	%	±%
Labour	Fay Howard	775	40.9	−1.7
Conservative	Graham Cherry	603	31.8	−3.8
BNP	Chris Southgate	223	11.8	+11.8
Liberal Democrats	Helen Thompson	213	11.2	+11.2
Green	David Miles	81	4.3	−17.5
Majority		172	9.1	+2.1
Turnout		1,895	27.7	
Labour hold		Swing	+1.0%	

Penhill
Party	Candidate	Votes	%	±%
Labour	Paul Baker	519	41.7	−3.5
Liberal Democrats	Tel Hudson	314	25.2	−5.7
Conservative	Halina Tomlinson	249	20.0	−3.9
BNP	Ken Waters	162	13.0	+13.0
Majority		205	16.5	+2.2
Turnout		1,244	27.8	
Labour gain from Independent		Swing	+1.1%	

Shaw and Nine Elms
Party	Candidate	Votes	%	±%
Conservative	Garry Perkins	1,244	56.1	−4.1
Liberal Democrats	James Farr	392	17.7	+4.8
Labour	Mary Gladman	375	16.9	−1.2
Green	Jennifer Miles	207	9.3	+0.5
Majority		852	38.4	−3.7
Turnout		2,218	31.7	
Conservative hold		Swing	-4.4%	

St Margaret
Party	Candidate	Votes	%	±%
Conservative	Russell Holland	1,325	51.8	−11.6
Labour	Michael Spry	728	28.5	−8.1
Liberal Democrats	Peter Wood	264	10.3	+10.3
UKIP	Robert Feal-Martinez	239	9.4	+9.4
Majority		597	23.4	−3.5
Turnout		2,556	32.3	
Conservative hold		Swing	-1.7%	

St Philip
Party	Candidate	Votes	%	±%
Conservative	Paul Findlow	1,254	41.9	+0.1
Labour	Teresa Page	1,218	40.7	−0.3
UKIP	Peter Thompson-Watt	212	7.1	+7.1
Liberal Democrats	Ann Richards	186	6.2	−2.4
Green	Raymond Smith	125	4.2	−4.4
Majority		36	1.2	+0.3
Turnout		2,995	41.7	
Conservative hold		Swing	+0.2%	

Toothill & Westlea
Party	Candidate	Votes	%	±%
Conservative	Steve Wakefield	979	52.3	+4.1
Labour	Junab Ali	411	21.9	−3.5
Liberal Democrats	Christopher Shepherd	297	15.9	+1.0
Green	Marilyn Harrison	186	9.9	−1.6
Majority		568	30.3	+7.5
Turnout		1,873	32.3	
Conservative hold		Swing	+3.8%	

Walcot
Party	Candidate	Votes	%	±%
Conservative	Peter Mallinson	756	39.0	+5.3
Labour	Neil Heavens	711	36.7	−5.1
Liberal Democrats	Kathy McCarthy	249	12.9	−4.3
UKIP	Stephen Halden	141	7.3	+7.3
Green	Ray Burcham	80	4.1	−3.1
Majority		45	2.3	
Turnout		1,937	34.7	
Conservative hold		Swing	+5.2%	

Western
Party	Candidate	Votes	%	±%
Labour	Des Moffatt	1,268	49.4	+3.1
Conservative	Jon Watton	656	25.5	−7.4
Liberal Democrats	Mark Cousens	243	9.5	−6.2
UKIP	Greg Heathcliffe	188	7.3	+7.3
Green	Deborah Schofield	153	6.0	+6.0
Independent	Michael Morton	60	2.3	+2.3
Majority		612	23.8	+10.4
Turnout		2,568	31.6	
Labour hold		Swing	+5.2%	

Wroughton and Chiseldon
Party	Candidate	Votes	%	±%
Conservative	Bill Morton	1,650	55.3	+0.2
Liberal Democrats	Victor Godman	668	22.4	+7.6
Labour	Ruairi Tobin	442	14.8	+0.3
Green	Bob Heritage	223	7.5	+0.4
Majority		982	32.9	−7.4
Turnout		2,983	37.6	
Conservative hold		Swing	-3.7%	
