= Blunsdon and Highworth (ward) =

Former ward of Swindon Borough Council

- Former ward Swindon Borough Council
- Major settlements: Blunsdon; Highworth

2012–2026
- Number of councillors: 3
- Replaced by: Blunsdon; Highworth
- Created from: Blunsdon; Highworth
- UK Parliament constituency: Swindon North

Blunsdon and Highworth was an electoral ward in the Borough of Swindon, England, which elected three councillors to Swindon Borough Council between 2012 and 2024, formed from a merger of the Blunsdon and Highworth wards. It was abolished in 2026 when boundary changes saw the return of the two standalone wards. The ward elected solely Conservative Party councillors for its entire existence.

== Geography ==
The ward covered the civil parish of Blunsdon and market town of Highworth; both are situated on the rural fringes of the borough, the former on the northern edge and the latter just northeast of the main Swindon urban area.

== Demographics ==
In the 2021 census, the population of the ward was 11,445.

== Councillors ==
Election	Councillors		
2012	Maureen Rita Penny (Conservative)	Alan John Bishop (Conservative)	Doreen Dart (Conservative)
2012 (by)	Maureen Rita Penny (Conservative)	Alan John Bishop (Conservative)	Steve Weisinger (Conservative)
2014	Maureen Rita Penny (Conservative)	Alan John Bishop (Conservative)	Steve Weisinger (Conservative)
2015	Maureen Rita Penny (Conservative)	Alan John Bishop (Conservative)	Steve Weisinger (Conservative)
2016	Maureen Rita Penny (Conservative)	Alan John Bishop (Conservative)	Steve Weisinger (Conservative)
2018	Maureen Rita Penny (Conservative)	Alan John Bishop (Conservative)	Steve Weisinger (Conservative)
2019	Maureen Rita Penny (Conservative)	Alan John Bishop (Conservative)	Steve Weisinger (Conservative)
2021	Vijay Kumar Manro (Conservative)	Alan John Bishop (Conservative)	Steve Weisinger (Conservative)
2022	Vijay Kumar Manro (Conservative)	Alan John Bishop (Conservative)	Steve Weisinger (Conservative)
2023	Vijay Kumar Manro (Conservative)	Nick Gardiner (Conservative)	Steve Weisinger (Conservative)
2024	Vijay Kumar Manro (Conservative)	Nick Gardiner (Conservative)	Steve Weisinger (Conservative)
2026	Ward abolished (see Blunsdon and Highworth)		

== Elections ==
2024 Swindon Borough Council election: Blunsdon & Highworth
Party	Candidate	Votes	%	±%
Conservative	Vijay Manro*	1,399	45.4	+0.2
Labour	Ian James	1,191	38.6	+3.6
Green	Andrew Day	336	10.9	−1.6
Liberal Democrats	Hannah Pajak	127	4.1	−3.1
Majority		208	6.7	
Turnout		3,083	33.6	–3.8
Registered electors		9,187		
Conservative hold		Swing	▼1.7	

2023 Swindon Borough Council election: Blunsdon and Highworth
Party	Candidate	Votes	%	±%
Conservative	Nick Gardiner	1,509	45.2	−8.5
Labour Co-op	Lesley Ann Gow	1,168	35.0	+3.0
Green	Andrew Day	418	12.5	−1.8
Liberal Democrats	Deborah King	241	7.2	N/A
Majority		341		
Turnout		3,372	37.39	
Registered electors		9,019		
Conservative hold		Swing		

2022 Swindon Borough Council election: Blunsdon & Highworth
Party	Candidate	Votes	%	±%
Conservative	Steven Mark Weisinger *	1,715	53.7	−2.90
Labour Co-op	Lesley Ann Gow	1,024	32.0	+2.01
Green	Andrew Donald Day	457	14.3	+8.21
Majority		691	21.6	
Turnout		3,212	36.06	
Registered electors		8,908		
Conservative hold		Swing		

2021 Swindon Borough Council election: Blunsdon & Highworth
Party	Candidate	Votes	%	±%
Conservative	Vijay Kumar Manro	2,073	56.9	+4.7
Labour	Keir Baynham	867	23.8	Steady
Green	Andrew Day	442	12.1	−2.2
Liberal Democrats	Michael Heal	137	3.8	−5.0
Independent	Tara Hurst	126	3.5	n/a
Majority		1,206	33.1	+4.8
Turnout		3,645	40.9	+3.2
Conservative hold		Swing	+2.35	

2019 Swindon Borough Council election: Blunsdon & Highworth
Party	Candidate	Votes	%	±%
Conservative	Alan Bishop	1,654	52.1	−4.5
Labour	Jamie Cope	756	23.8	−6.2
Green	Andrew Day	453	14.3	+8.2
Liberal Democrats	Malcolm Salmon	312	9.8	+5.7
Majority		898	28.3	
Turnout		3,175	37.7	
Conservative hold		Swing		

2018 Swindon Borough Council election: Blunsdon & Highworth
Party	Candidate	Votes	%	±%
Conservative	Steve Weisinger*	2,147	56.47	+ 8.50
Labour	Jamie Cope	1,140	29.98	+ 6.38
Green	Andrew Donald Day	231	6.08	− 0.88
Liberal Democrats	Geoffrey King	155	4.08	+ 0.53
UKIP	Sheila Attwater	123	3.24	− 14.4
Turnout		3,802	43.69	
Registered electors		8,702		
Conservative hold		Swing		

2016 Swindon Borough Council election: Blunsdon & Highworth
Party	Candidate	Votes	%	±%
Conservative	Maureen Rita Penny*	1,624	47.4	
Labour	Alison Mary Durrant	1,053	30.7	
UKIP	John Fairlamb Short	429	12.5	
Green	Andrew Donald Day	200	5.8	
Liberal Democrats	Geoffrey King	121	3.5	
Majority		571	16.7	
Turnout		3,427	40	
Conservative hold		Swing		

2015 Swindon Borough Council election: Blunsdon & Highworth
Party	Candidate	Votes	%	±%
Conservative	Alan John Bishop *	3,502	55.3	+7.2
Labour	Pam Adams	1,523	24.1	+0.4
UKIP	Ross Shugar	838	13.2	–4.5
Green	Andrew Donald Day	466	7.4	+0.4
Majority		1,979	31.4	+7.0
Turnout		6,329	71.32	+31.13
Registered electors		8,874		
Conservative hold		Swing		

2014 Swindon Borough Council election: Blunsdon & Highworth
Party	Candidate	Votes	%	±%
Conservative	Steve Weisinger	1,689	48.1	+3.3
Labour	Phil Beaumont	831	23.7	–7.6
UKIP	Ross Shugar	621	17.7	N/A
Green	Andrew Donald Day	245	7.0	–6.0
Liberal Democrats	Clive Hooper	125	3.6	–7.4
Majority		858	24.4	N/A
Turnout		3,521	40.19	+5.96
Registered electors		8,760		
Conservative hold		Swing		

2012 Blunsdon and Highworth by-election
Party	Candidate	Votes	%	±%
Conservative	Steve Weisinger	1,453		
Labour	Phil Beaumont	1,075		
UKIP	John Lenton	195		
Green	Andrew Donald Day	111		
Liberal Democrats	Cath Smith	23		
Majority		378		
Turnout			32.6	
Conservative hold		Swing		

A by-election was held in Blunsdon and Highworth on 15 November 2012 following the death of Councillor Doreen Dart from lung cancer in October 2012.

2012 Swindon Borough Council election: Blunsdon & Highworth (3 seats)
Party	Candidate	Votes	%	±%
Conservative	Maureen Rita Penny	1,530	44.8	N/A
Conservative	Alan John Bishop	1,528	–	
Conservative	Doreen Dart	1,489	–	
Labour	Phil Beaumont	1,067	31.3	N/A
Labour	Alison Mary Durrant	968	–	
Labour	Phillip Edward Gaskin	824	–	
Green	Andrew Donald Day	442	13.0	N/A
Liberal Democrats	Jenny Shorten	374	11.0	N/A
Turnout		2,974	34.23	N/A
Registered electors		8,689		
Conservative win (new seat)				
Conservative win (new seat)				
Conservative win (new seat)				

== See also ==
- List of electoral divisions and wards in Wiltshire
