= 2018 Swindon Borough Council election =

2018 Swindon Borough Council Election
← 2016	3 May 2018	2019 →

19 of the 57 seats to Swindon Borough Council 29 seats needed for a majority
	First party	Second party	Third party
Party	Conservative	Labour	Liberal Democrats
Seats before	30	25	2
Seats won	9	9	2
Seats after	29	26	2
Seat change	▼1	▲1	Steady
Popular vote	25,766	26,346	4,761
Percentage	41.34%	42.27%	7.64%
- Winner in each ward for the 2018 Swindon Borough Council election. Grey signifies uncontested.
Council control before election
Conservatives
Council control after election
Conservatives

The 2018 Swindon Borough Council election took place on 3 May 2018, to elect members of Swindon Borough Council in England. This was on the same day as other local elections.

The Conservatives held on to their majority on the council but it was lowered to one after losing a councillor to the Liberal Democrats in Wroughton & Wichelstowe. The Liberal Democrats lost a councillor to Labour in Eastcott, so the election's net gain of one was to Labour from the Conservatives. Labour had had high hopes of winning control of the council, and the Party's leader Jeremy Corbyn had visited Swindon on five occasions during the local election campaign. The Party was reported to be 'deeply disappointed' with the result.

The Conservative Council leader David Renard described himself as "absolutely delighted" that his Party "fended off a significant challenge from the Labour Party". The BBC's West of England politics editor Paul Barltrop felt Labour's failure to take the council would be more than disappointing to party members, noting that Swindon tends to give an idea of what will happen at the next general election.

Swindon was one of the boroughs subject to a trial of voter ID restrictions requiring the production of polling cards.

== Results summary ==
Change since previous election in 2016.

2018 Swindon Borough Council election
Party	This election			Full council			This election		
Party	Seats	Net	Seats %	Other	Total	Total %	Votes	Votes %	+/−
Conservative	9	▼1	47.37	20	29	50.88	25,766	41.34	+3.41
Labour	9	▲1	47.37	17	26	45.61	26,346	42.27	+2.10
Liberal Democrats	1	Steady	5.26	1	2	3.51	4,761	7.64	+0.08
Green	0	Steady	0.0	0	0	0.0	2,875	4.61	+0.07
UKIP	0	Steady	0.0	0	0	0.0	2,418	3.88	-5.11

== Results by ward ==
All changes calculated on 2014 results.

=== Blunsdon & Highworth ===
Blunsdon & Highworth
Party	Candidate	Votes	%	±%
Conservative	Steve Weisinger*	2,147	56.47	+ 8.50
Labour	Jamie Cope	1,140	29.98	+ 6.38
Green	Andrew Donald Day	231	6.08	− 0.88
Liberal Democrats	Geoffrey King	155	4.08	+ 0.53
UKIP	Sheila Attwater	123	3.24	− 14.4
Turnout		3,802	43.69	
Registered electors		8,702		
Conservative hold		Swing		

=== Central ===
Central
Party	Candidate	Votes	%	±%
Labour	Junab Ali*	3,141	71.31	+ 33.71
Conservative	David Bell	752	17.07	+ 3.73
Liberal Democrats	Ray James	227	5.15	− 27.11
Green	Robert Heritage	147	3.34	+ 3.34
UKIP	Jason Costello	117	2.66	− 9.66
Turnout		4,405	45.91	
Registered electors		9,594		
Labour hold		Swing		

=== Chiseldon & Lawn ===
Chiseldon & Lawn
Party	Candidate	Votes	%	±%
Conservative	Brian Mattock*	1,292	53.57	+ 9.50
Labour	Peter Bates	656	27.20	+ 9.15
Green	Paul Sunners	208	8.62	− 1.39
Liberal Democrats	Hans Krohn	167	6.92	+ 1.65
UKIP	Charlene Goddard	81	3.36	− 18.75
Turnout		2,412	44.31	
Registered electors		5,444		
Conservative hold		Swing		

=== Covingham & Dorcan ===
Covingham & Dorcan
Party	Candidate	Votes	%	±%
Conservative	Kevin Parry*	2,608	67.41	+ 28.37
Labour	Bazil Solomon	922	23.83	− 8.12
Liberal Democrats	Malcolm Salmon	125	3.23	+ 3.23
UKIP	Barbara Skull	112	2.89	− 22.06
Green	Kate Henery	102	2.64	− 1.16
Turnout		3,876	46.01	
Registered electors		8,425		
Conservative hold		Swing		

=== Eastcott ===
Eastcott
Party	Candidate	Votes	%	±%
Labour	Imtiyaz Shaikh*	1,621	45.93	+ 14.76
Liberal Democrats	Toby Robson	1,344	38.01	− 5.82
Conservative	Drusilla Summers	370	10.48	+ 1.67
Green	Steve Pagett	118	3.34	− 3.19
UKIP	Susan Day	76	2.15	− 7.17
Turnout		3,543	44.29	
Registered electors		7,797		
Labour gain from Liberal Democrats		Swing		

=== Gorsehill & Pinehurst ===
Gorsehill & Pinehurst
Party	Candidate	Votes	%	±%
Labour	Carol Shelley*	1,614	52.76	+ 13.44
Conservative	Adam John	927	30.3	+ 5.86
UKIP	Aubrey Attwater	222	7.26	− 19.74
Green	Steve Thompson	186	6.08	− 3
Liberal Democrats	Christopher Edwards	110	3.6	+ 3.6
Turnout		3,068	34.85	
Registered electors		8,803		
Labour hold		Swing		

=== Haydon Wick ===
Haydon Wick
Party	Candidate	Votes	%	±%
Conservative	Garry Perkins*	1,806	49.45	+ 11.76
Labour	Maura Clarke	1,398	38.28	+ 6.52
Green	Poppy Leeder	152	4.16	+ 4.16
UKIP	Ed Gerrard	148	4.05	− 21.39
Liberal Democrats	Deborah King	148	4.05	− 0.47
Turnout		3,657	40.99	
Registered electors		8,920		
Conservative hold		Swing		

=== Liden, Eldene & Park South ===
Liden, Eldene & Park South
Party	Candidate	Votes	%	±%
Labour	Janine Howarth*	1,325	44.21	+ 9.53
Conservative	Zachary Hawson	1,231	41.07	+ 12.45
UKIP	Martin Costello	211	7.04	− 21.26
Liberal Democrats	Krista Salmon	142	4.74	+ 1.41
Green	Simon Fairbourn	88	2.94	− 1.63
Turnout		3,002	37.22	
Registered electors		8,066		
Labour hold		Swing		

=== Lydiard & Freshbrook ===
Lydiard & Freshbrook
Party	Candidate	Votes	%	±%
Conservative	Tim Swinyard*	1,719	48.67	+ 11.9
Labour	Neil Hopkins	1,443	40.86	+ 12.28
Liberal Democrats	Ann Richards	144	4.08	− 1.42
Green	Andy Bentley	121	3.43	− 0.9
UKIP	Zygmunt Taylor	105	2.97	− 21.47
Turnout		3,543	42.39	
Registered electors		8,358		
Conservative hold		Swing		

=== Mannington & Western ===
Mannington & Western
Party	Candidate	Votes	%	±%
Labour	Jim Robbins*	1,474	57.65	+ 15.32
Conservative	John Lenton	687	26.87	+ 2.56
UKIP	John Newbold	138	5.4	− 20.51
Green	Peter Dilly	134	5.24	+ 5.24
Liberal Democrats	James Taylor	124	4.85	− 1.74
Turnout		2,568	34.80	
Registered electors		7,379		
Labour hold		Swing		

=== Old Town ===
Old Town
Party	Candidate	Votes	%	±%
Labour	Nadine Watts*	1,781	50.42	+ 4.74
Conservative	Nick Burns-Howell	1,452	41.1	+ 5.05
Green	Bill Hughes	126	3.57	+ 3.57
Liberal Democrats	Peter Oliver	116	3.28	− 2.5
UKIP	Edward Costello	57	1.61	− 10.72
Turnout		3,542	45.18	
Registered electors		7,839		
Labour hold		Swing		

=== Penhill & Upper Stratton ===
Penhill & Upper Stratton
Party	Candidate	Votes	%	±%
Labour	Claire Crilly*	1,396	48.74	+ 8.12
Conservative	Oladapo Ibitoye	1,093	38.16	+ 13.96
UKIP	Melanie Bailey	167	5.83	− 23.81
Liberal Democrats	Michelle Horrobin	126	4.4	+ 4.4
Green	Howard March	82	2.86	− 2.34
Turnout		2,869	31.12	
Registered electors		9,220		
Labour hold		Swing		

=== Priory Vale ===
Priory Vale
Party	Candidate	Votes	%	±%
Conservative	Emma Faramarzi*	1,605	58.71	+ 8.11
Labour	Thomas Smith	798	29.19	+ 8.12
Green	Bradley Williams	146	5.34	+ 5.34
Liberal Democrats	Margaret Hooper	118	4.32	− 2.29
UKIP	Terence Moroney	67	2.45	− 18.86
Turnout		2,739	32.43	
Registered electors		8,447		
Conservative hold		Swing		

=== Rodbourne Cheney ===
Rodbourne Cheney
Party	Candidate	Votes	%	±%
Labour	Peter Watts*	1,601	53.33	+ 10.2
Conservative	Steven Heyes	991	33.01	+ 10.93
UKIP	Dwayne Godwin	164	5.46	− 22.93
Green	Rod Hebden-Leeder	138	4.6	− 1.15
Liberal Democrats	Kathy McCarthy	108	3.6	+ 3.6
Turnout		3,011	33.60	
Registered electors		8,962		
Labour hold		Swing		

=== Shaw ===
Shaw
Party	Candidate	Votes	%	±%
Conservative	Mary Martin*	1,545	46.02	+ 9.64
Labour	Simon Firth	1,365	40.66	+ 12.71
Liberal Democrats	Michael Heal	165	4.92	+ 1.26
Green	Ken Kimber	144	4.29	− 2.29
UKIP	Zygmunt Taylor	138	2.11	− 13.79
Turnout		3,365	41.55	
Registered electors		8,098		
Conservative hold		Swing		

=== St Andrews ===
St Andrews
Party	Candidate	Votes	%	±%
Conservative	Rahul Tarar*	1,596	54.83	+ 1.82
Labour	Jason Mills	856	29.41	+ 6.55
Green	Flora Wilkins	186	6.39	+ 6.39
Liberal Democrats	Garry Porter	176	6.05	− 1.78
UKIP	Terence Hayward	97	3.33	− 15.84
Turnout		2,920	29.47	
Registered electors		9,910		
Conservative hold		Swing		

=== St Margaret & South Marston ===
St Margaret & South Marston
Party	Candidate	Votes	%	±%
Conservative	Roger Smith*	2,011	49.93	+ 10.87
Labour	Barrie Jennings	1,678	41.66	+ 11.62
UKIP	Richard Lewis	125	3.10	− 22.72
Green	Anita March	120	2.98	+ 2.98
Liberal Democrats	Nicholas Roberts	94	2.33	− 2.3
Turnout		4,036	43.90	
Registered electors		9,194		
Conservative hold		Swing		

=== Walcot & Park North ===
Walcot & Park North
Party	Candidate	Votes	%	±%
Labour	Abdul Amin*	1,762	55.48	+ 16.3
Conservative	Roy Stephen	936	29.47	+ 10.09
UKIP	Steve Halden	191	6.01	− 22.65
Liberal Democrats	Anthony Barter	167	5.26	− 0.8
Green	Kate Freeman	120	3.78	− 2.08
Turnout		3,180	36.16	
Registered electors		8,794		
Labour hold		Swing		

=== Wroughton & Wichelstowe ===
Wroughton & Wichelstowe
Party	Candidate	Votes	%	±%
Liberal Democrats	Andy Spry	1,005	36.1	+17.4
Conservative	Wayne Lawrence Crabbe *	998	35.9	+2.8
Labour	Sam James	375	13.5	–0.3
Green	Talis Kimberley-Fairbourn	326	11.7	+1.0
UKIP	Lincoln Vincent Williams	79	2.8	–15.6
Majority		7	0.3	N/A
Turnout		2,789	45.13	
Registered electors		6,180		
Liberal Democrats gain from Conservative		Swing		
