= 2024 Swindon Borough Council election =

2024 English local election

- 4 May 2024

20 out of 57 seats to Swindon Borough Council 29 seats needed for a majority

	First party	Second party
Leader	Jim Robbins	Gary Sumner
Party	Labour	Conservative
Last election	32 seats, 51.9%	23 seats, 34.7%
Seats before	32	23
Seats won	14	6
Seats after	41	15
Seat change	▲9	▼8
Popular vote	25,574	18,060
Percentage	50.2%	35.5%
Swing	▼1.7%	▲0.8%
	Third party	Fourth party
Leader	Adam Poole
Party	Liberal Democrats	Independent
Last election	1 seat, 7.9%	1 seat, 0.4%
Seats before	1	1
Seats won	0	0
Seats after	1	0
Seat change	Steady	▼1
Popular vote	5,011	718
Percentage	9.8%	1.4%
Swing	▲1.9%	▲1.0%
- Winner of each seat at the 2024 Swindon Borough Council election
Leader before election
Jim Robbins
Labour
Leader after election
Jim Robbins
Labour

The 2024 Swindon Borough Council election took place on 2 May 2024 to elect councillors to Swindon Borough Council in Wiltshire, England. The elections was on the same day as other local elections across England. A third of seats were contested.

At the previous council election, Labour gained an overall majority control of Swindon Borough Council after gaining 9 seats, with the Conservatives losing 10 seats. They increased their majority from 5 seats in 2023 to 13 seats in 2024.

== Results summary ==
2024 Swindon Borough Council election
Party	This election				Full council			This election		
Party	Candidates	Seats	Net	Seats %	Other	Total	Total %	Votes	Votes %	+/−
Labour	{{{candidates}}}	14	▲9	70.0	27	41	71.9	25,574	50.2	-1.7
Conservative	{{{candidates}}}	6	▼8	30.0	9	15	26.3	18,060	35.5	+0.8
Liberal Democrats	{{{candidates}}}	0	Steady	0.0	1	1	1.8	5,011	9.8	+1.9
Green	{{{candidates}}}	0	Steady	0.0	0	0	0.0	2,529	5.0	+0.1
Independent	{{{candidates}}}	0	▼1	0.0	0	0	0.0	718	1.4	+1.0
TUSC	{{{candidates}}}	0	Steady	0.0	0	0	0.0	404	0.8	+0.6
Reform	{{{candidates}}}	0	Steady	0.0	0	0	0.0	284	0.6	N/A

== Ward results ==
Borough Statement of Persons nominated per each Ward:

The results were as follows:

=== Blunsdon and Highworth ===
Blunsdon & Highworth
Party	Candidate	Votes	%	±%
Conservative	Vijay Manro*	1,399	45.4	+0.2
Labour	Ian James	1,191	38.6	+3.6
Green	Andrew Day	336	10.9	−1.6
Liberal Democrats	Hannah Pajak	127	4.1	−3.1
Majority		208	6.7	
Turnout		3,083	33.6	–3.8
Registered electors		9,187		
Conservative hold		Swing	▼1.7	

=== Central ===
Central
Party	Candidate	Votes	%	±%
Labour	Domingos Dias	2,117	52.6	−9.2
Conservative	Lourenco Fernandes*	838	20.8	−12.1
Independent	Vintur Fernandes	718	17.8	N/A
Liberal Democrats	Marek Sarnowski	195	4.8	+1.1
TUSC	Mary Quate	124	3.1	N/A
Majority		1,279	31.8	
Turnout		4,027	39.6	–1.4
Registered electors		10,158		
Labour gain from Conservative		Swing	▲1.5	

=== Covingham and Dorcan ===
Covingham & Dorcan
Party	Candidate	Votes	%	±%
Conservative	Barbara Parry*	1,469	48.2	+2.0
Labour	Rebecca Banwell-Moore	1,363	44.7	+4.5
Liberal Democrats	Sheila Kerslake	111	3.6	−2.7
TUSC	Scott Hunter	86	2.8	+1.3
Majority		106	3.5	
Turnout		3,048	36.9	+2.5
Registered electors		8,254		
Conservative hold		Swing	▼1.3	

=== Eastcott ===
Eastcott
Party	Candidate	Votes	%	±%
Labour	Marina Strinkovsky*	1,719	60.8	+0.8
Liberal Democrats	Toby Robson	455	16.1	−6.2
Conservative	Srinivasu Anupindi	388	13.7	+0.7
Green	Chris Noyce	233	8.2	+3.6
Majority		1264	44.7	
Turnout		2,828	35.5	–4.8
Registered electors		7,973		
Labour hold		Swing	▲3.5	

=== Gorse Hill and Pinehurst ===
Gorse Hill & Pinehurst
Party	Candidate	Votes	%	±%
Labour	Princia Jenovi Fernandes	1,652	61.5	+5.0
Conservative	Niyi Adekoya	530	19.7	−13.5
Green	Andy Bentley	290	10.8	+3.6
Liberal Democrats	Gerry Taylor	133	5.0	+2.0
TUSC	Helen Harris	48	1.8	N/A
Majority		1,122	41.8	
Turnout		2,684	28.9	–2.0
Registered electors		9,285		
Labour hold		Swing	▲9.3	

=== Haydon Wick ===
Haydon Wick
Party	Candidate	Votes	%	±%
Labour	Ray Ballman*	1,359	50.3	−7.0
Conservative	Bose Patrick-Okoh	1,050	38.9	+2.1
Liberal Democrats	Geoffrey King	257	9.5	+3.6
Majority		309	11.4	
Turnout		2,701	31.0	–5.7
Registered electors		8,726		
Labour gain from Conservative		Swing	▼4.6	

=== Liden, Eldene and Park South ===
Liden, Eldene & Park South
Party	Candidate	Votes	%	±%
Labour	Marianne Le Coyte-Grinney	1,308	53.4	−5.2
Conservative	Roy Stephen	662	27.0	−9.3
Reform	Bob Wheeler	284	11.6	N/A
Liberal Democrats	Malcolm Salmon	187	7.6	+2.5
Majority		646	26.4	
Turnout		2,451	30.5	–3.2
Registered electors		8,030		
Labour gain from Conservative		Swing	▲2.1	

=== Lydiard and Freshbrook ===
Lydiard & Freshbrook
Party	Candidate	Votes	%	±%
Labour	Leon Grother	1,312	51.6	−1.1
Conservative	Caryl Sydney-Smith	898	35.3	−3.5
Liberal Democrats	Christopher Shepard	208	8.2	+3.1
TUSC	Robert Pettefar	102	4.0	+0.6
Majority		414	16.3	
Turnout		2,545	31.6	–4.0
Registered electors		8,053		
Labour gain from Conservative		Swing	▲1.2	

=== Mannington and Western ===
Mannington & Western
Party	Candidate	Votes	%	±%
Labour	Kevin Small*	1,368	66.2	+1.1
Conservative	Nandini Singh	464	22.5	−5.0
Liberal Democrats	Fraser McCormick	204	9.9	+2.5
Majority		904	43.8	
Turnout		2,065	27.4	–3.7
Registered electors		7,544		
Labour hold		Swing	▲3.1	

=== Old Town ===
Old Town
Party	Candidate	Votes	%	±%
Labour	Jane Milner-Barry*	1,873	65.5	+1.0
Conservative	Bazil Solomon	586	20.5	−2.1
Green	Bill Hughes	181	6.3	−0.7
Liberal Democrats	Martin Wiltshire	157	5.5	−0.5
TUSC	Daisy Bowie	44	1.5	N/A
Majority		1,287	45.0	
Turnout		2,858	35.1	–4.3
Registered electors		8,136		
Labour hold		Swing	▲1.6	

=== Penhill and Upper Stratton ===
Penhill & Upper Stratton
Party	Candidate	Votes	%	±%
Labour	Thomas Smith	1,106	49.2	−4.0
Conservative	David Ibitoye	878	39.0	+0.7
Liberal Democrats	Michelle Horrobin	244	10.8	+2.3
Majority		228	10.1	
Turnout		2,249	25.0	–5.1
Registered electors		9,006		
Labour gain from Conservative		Swing	▼1.7	

=== Priory Vale ===
Priory Vale
Party	Candidate	Votes	%	±%
Labour	Ian Edwards	1,156	45.8	−1.8
Conservative	Vinay Manro	1,076	42.6	+0.5
Green	Pete Best	172	6.8	+0.7
Liberal Democrats	Deborah King	101	4.0	−0.2
Majority		80	3.2	
Turnout		2,525	29.1	–4.0
Registered electors		8,676		
Labour gain from Conservative		Swing	▼0.7	

=== Ridgeway ===
Ridgeway
Party	Candidate	Votes	%	±%
Conservative	Gary Sumner*	574	55.3	−17.3
Liberal Democrats	Liz Mearns	246	23.7	+9.3
Labour	Stephen Allsop	216	20.8	+10.4
Majority		328	31.6	
Turnout		1,038	37.6	–14.1
Registered electors		2,763		
Conservative hold		Swing	▼13.3	

=== Rodbourne Cheney ===
Rodbourne Cheney
Party	Candidate	Votes	%	±%
Labour	Ana Fernandes *	1,420	53.4	−7.1
Conservative	Sudha Nukana	870	32.7	+4.7
Green	Rod Hebden	231	8.7	+1.7
Liberal Democrats	Ciaran Skinner	118	4.4	−0.2
Majority		550	20.7	
Turnout		2,659	28.7	±0.0
Registered electors		9,257		
Labour gain from Conservative		Swing	▼5.9	

=== Shaw ===
Shaw
Party	Candidate	Votes	%	±%
Labour	Rose Llewellyn	1,405	50.0	+0.8
Conservative	Keith Williams*	1,131	40.3	−1.9
Liberal Democrats	Zoe McCormick	248	8.8	+0.2
Majority		274	9.8	
Turnout		2,808	35.1	–4.1
Registered electors		8,009		
Labour gain from Conservative		Swing	▲1.7	

=== St Andrews ===
St Andrews
Party	Candidate	Votes	%	±%
Conservative	Daniel Adams*	1,642	45.0	+10.4
Labour	Josh Wood	1,490	40.9	+0.5
Green	Howard March	311	8.5	−13.5
Liberal Democrats	Dawn Pajak	191	5.2	+2.1
Majority		152	4.2	
Turnout		3,647	28.4	–1.4
Registered electors		12,845		
Conservative hold		Swing	▲5.0	

=== St Margaret and South Marston ===
St Margaret & South Marston
Party	Candidate	Votes	%	±%
Labour	Simon Shelley	1,231	43.0	−6.8
Conservative	Eleanor Willis	1,199	41.9	+2.9
Green	Ella March	210	7.3	+0.5
Liberal Democrats	Lynda Comber	183	6.4	+1.9
Majority		32	1.1	
Turnout		2,861	30.4	–5.8
Registered electors		9,426		
Labour gain from Conservative		Swing	▼4.9	

=== Walcot and Park North ===
Walcot & Park North
Party	Candidate	Votes	%	±%
Labour	Jamal Miah*	1,539	64.0	+5.8
Conservative	Dave Bell	496	20.6	−9.2
Liberal Democrats	Michael Dickinson	187	7.8	+2.3
Green	Ian Lodwick	160	6.7	N/A
Majority		1,043	43.4	
Turnout		2,403	27.2	–5.4
Registered electors		8,842		
Labour hold		Swing	▲7.5	

=== Wroughton and Wichelstowe ===
Wroughton & Wichelstowe (2 seats due to by-election)
Party	Candidate	Votes	%	±%
Conservative	Matty Courtliff	1,026	42.3	+7.6
Conservative	Gayle Cook	884	36.4	+1.7
Liberal Democrats	Martin Barrett	816	33.6	−2.0
Liberal Democrats	Stan Pajak	643	26.5	−9.1
Labour	Saleh Ahmed	417	17.2	−2.2
Green	Simon Fairbourn	405	16.7	+6.4
Labour	Abdul Hamid	332	13.7	−5.7
Turnout		2,427	34.9	–2.3
Registered electors		6,950		
Conservative hold				
Conservative gain from Independent				

== Changes 2024-2026 ==
=== Affiliation changes ===
In October 2025, three Labour Councillors Repi Begum, Ian Edwards and Tom Butcher joined the Green Party followed by another, Rob Heath, in November.

=== By-elections ===
==== Rodbourne Cheney ====
Rodbourne Cheney by-election: 17 October 2024
Party	Candidate	Votes	%	±%
Conservative	Sudha Nukana	991	48.6	+15.9
Labour	Meural Cardoso	694	34.0	–19.4
Green	Roderick Hebden	173	8.5	–0.2
Independent	Alex Petrarche	100	4.9	N/A
Liberal Democrats	Ciaran Skinner	82	4.0	–0.4
Majority		297	14.6	N/A
Turnout		2,053	21.7	–7.0
Registered electors		9,457		
Conservative gain from Labour		Swing	▲17.7	
