= 2015 Swindon Borough Council election =

2015 UK local government election

Map of the results of the 2015 Swindon council election. Conservatives in blue and Labour in red. Wards in grey were not contested in 2015.

The 2015 Swindon Borough Council election took place on 7 May 2015, to elect members of Swindon Borough Council in England. This was on the same day as other local elections. The Conservative Party increased their majority after gaining two seats. Of the 19 seats up for election, four seats changed hands to leave the Conservatives (32) with a majority of seven seats over Labour (23) and the Lib Dems (2).

== Ward results ==
Sitting councillors seeking re-election, elected in 2012, are marked with an asterisk (*). The ward results listed below are based on the changes from the 2014 elections, not taking into account any party defections or by-elections.

=== Blunsdon & Highworth ===
Blunsdon & Highworth
Party	Candidate	Votes	%	±%
Conservative	Alan John Bishop *	3,502	55.3	+7.2
Labour	Pam Adams	1,523	24.1	+0.4
UKIP	Ross Shugar	838	13.2	–4.5
Green	Andrew Donald Day	466	7.4	+0.4
Majority		1,979	31.4	+7.0
Turnout		6,329	71.32	+31.13
Registered electors		8,874		
Conservative hold		Swing		

=== Central ===
Central
Party	Candidate	Votes	%	±%
Labour	Julie Wright *	2,567	45.1	+7.1
Conservative	Dave Bell	1,187	20.8	+7.2
Liberal Democrats	Antonio Banjamino Lopes	1,176	20.6	–12.0
UKIP	Bob Sheppard	499	8.8	–3.6
Green	Adam Grizzly Wilkinson-Moore	218	3.8	N/A
Independent	Karsten Evans	48	0.8	N/A
Majority		1,380	24.4	+19.0
Turnout		5,695	58.87	+19.15
Registered electors		9,674		
Labour hold		Swing		

=== Chiseldon & Lawn ===
Chiseldon & Lawn
Party	Candidate	Votes	%	±%
Conservative	Fionuala Foley *	2,056	56.4	+12.1
Labour	Dave Cox	648	17.8	–0.3
UKIP	Jennifer Mary Jefferies	445	12.2	–10.0
Green	Paul Sunners	301	8.3	–1.8
Liberal Democrats	Clive James Hooper	194	5.3	–
Majority		1,408	38.9	+16.8
Turnout		3,644	77.09	+33.01
Registered electors		4,727		
Conservative hold		Swing		

=== Covingham & Dorcan ===
Covingham & Dorcan
Party	Candidate	Votes	%	±%
Conservative	Dale James Heenan *	2,952	48.5	+9.4
Labour	Steve Wakefield	1,634	26.9	–5.1
UKIP	Brian James Osbourn	1,082	17.8	–7.2
Green	Lucy Rebecca Wilkinson-Moore	214	3.5	–0.3
Liberal Democrats	Gerry Taylor	201	3.3	N/A
Majority		1,318	21.7	+14.6
Turnout		6,083	68.43	+26.61
Registered electors		8,890		
Conservative hold		Swing		

=== Eastcott ===
Eastcott
Party	Candidate	Votes	%	±%
Labour	Paul Dixon	1,692	34.8	+3.5
Liberal Democrats	Toby Robson	1,247	25.9	–18.9
Conservative	Niki Bartoszewka	1,072	22.3	+13.5
UKIP	Graham Hyde	420	8.7	–0.6
Green	Graham Peter Mattingley	396	8.2	+1.6
Majority		445	9.3	N/A
Turnout		4,827	61.43	+22.74
Registered electors		7,858		
Labour gain from Liberal Democrats		Swing		

=== Gorse Hill & Pinehurst ===
Gorse Hill & Pinehurst
Party	Candidate	Votes	%	±%
Labour	John Ballman *	2,169	42.0	+2.6
Conservative	Clive Duncan Austin	1,643	31.8	+7.3
UKIP	Ian Robertson	1,013	19.6	–7.4
Green	Andy Bentley	335	6.5	–2.6
Majority		526	10.2	–2.1
Turnout		5,160	56.39	+23.90
Registered electors		9,151		
Labour hold		Swing		

=== Haydon Wick ===
Haydon Wick
Party	Candidate	Votes	%	±%
Conservative	David Charles Renard *	3,274	53.6	+15.7
Labour	Manetta Martha Rodrigues	1,551	25.4	–6.6
UKIP	Ed Gerrard	975	16.0	–9.6
Green	Simon Johnathan Fairbourn	308	5.0	N/A
Majority		1,723	28.4	+22.4
Turnout		6,108	66.60	+31.86
Registered electors		9,171		
Conservative hold		Swing		

=== Liden, Eldene & Park South ===
Liden, Eldene & Park South
Party	Candidate	Votes	%	±%
Labour	Chris Watts	2,007	37.8	+2.9
Conservative	Graham Charles Cherry	1,968	37.1	+8.3
UKIP	John Short	962	18.1	–10.3
Green	Rachel Edwards	199	3.8	–0.8
Liberal Democrats	Raymond Martin James	157	3.1	–0.2
Majority		39	0.7	–5.4
Turnout		5,303	60.65	+28.11
Registered electors		8,743		
Labour hold		Swing		

=== Lydiard and Freshbrook ===
Lydiard and Freshbrook
Party	Candidate	Votes	%	±%
Conservative	Caryl Ann Sydney-Smith	2,439	43.7	+6.8
Labour	Cindy Matthews *	1,640	29.4	+0.7
UKIP	John Lenton	940	16.9	–7.6
Liberal Democrats	Christopher Shepherd	331	5.9	+0.4
Green	Livio Pavone	225	4.0	–0.3
Majority		799	14.4	+6.2
Turnout		5,575	64.52	+26.91
Registered electors		8,760		
Conservative gain from Labour		Swing		

=== Mannington and Western ===
Mannington and Western
Party	Candidate	Votes	%	±%
Labour	Steph Exell	1,820	41.4	–1.3
Conservative	David Richard Statham Gould	1,522	34.6	+10.1
UKIP	Lincoln Williams	691	15.7	–10.4
Green	Tracey Michelle Jeapes	368	8.4	N/A
Majority		298	6.8	–9.8
Turnout		4,401	58.05	+27.12
Registered electors		7,581		
Labour hold		Swing		

=== Old Town ===
Old Town
Party	Candidate	Votes	%	±%
Conservative	Claire Ann Ellis	2,659	48.2	+12.1
Labour	Bob Cretchley	1,626	29.5	–16.3
UKIP	Terry Richard Davis	449	8.1	–4.3
Green	Rae McKellar	439	8.0	N/A
Liberal Democrats	Margaret Joan Hooper	341	6.2	+0.4
Majority		1,033	18.8	N/A
Turnout		5,514	69.53	+31.77
Registered electors		7,930		
Conservative hold		Swing		

=== Penhill & Upper Stratton ===
Penhill & Upper Stratton
Party	Candidate	Votes	%	±%
Labour	Teresa Jessica Page *	2,154	39.5	–1.3
Conservative	Harriet Katherine Maltby	1,906	34.9	+10.6
UKIP	David John Rowland	1,138	20.9	–8.8
Green	Robert Oliver Heritage	257	4.7	–0.5
Majority		248	4.6	–6.4
Turnout		5,455	56.97	+25.83
Registered electors		9,575		
Labour hold		Swing		

=== Priory Vale ===
Priory Vale
Party	Candidate	Votes	%	±%
Conservative	Toby Lewis Elliott *	3,314	60.6	+9.7
Labour	Michelle Agostino	1,213	22.2	+1.0
UKIP	Terry Reynolds	658	12.0	–9.4
Green	Simon William Smith	282	5.2	N/A
Majority		2,101	38.5	+9.1
Turnout		5,467	62.62	+34.47
Registered electors		8,730		
Conservative hold		Swing		

=== Rodbourne Cheney ===
Rodbourne Cheney
Party	Candidate	Votes	%	±%
Labour	Jim Grant *	2,394	42.7	–0.6
Conservative	Rahul Tarar	1,751	31.2	+9.0
UKIP	Peter Thompson-Watt	1,133	20.2	–8.4
Green	Rod Hebden	330	5.9	+0.1
Majority		643	11.5	–3.3
Turnout		5,608	60.09	+24.33
Registered electors		9,333		
Labour hold		Swing		

=== Shaw ===
Shaw
Party	Candidate	Votes	%	±%
Conservative	Nick Martin *	2,857	50.0	+13.5
Labour	Mike Heal	1,430	25.0	–3.0
UKIP	James Coates	772	13.5	–4.4
Liberal Democrats	James Ellrington Farr	329	5.8	+2.1
Green	Ken Kimber	323	5.7	–0.9
Majority		1,427	25.1	+16.6
Turnout		5,711	67.75	+31.31
Registered electors		8,429		
Conservative hold		Swing		

=== St Andrews ===
St Andrews
Party	Candidate	Votes	%	±%
Conservative	Mary Elizabeth Friend *	2,962	58.2	+6.7
Labour	Jason John Mills	1,044	20.5	–1.7
UKIP	Brian Stone	618	12.1	–6.5
Liberal Democrats	Geoff King	215	4.2	–3.4
Majority		1,918	37.8	N/A
Turnout		5,091	62.38	+35.02
Registered electors		8,161		
Conservative hold		Swing		

=== St Margaret & South Marston ===
St Margaret & South Marston
Party	Candidate	Votes	%	±%
Conservative	John Christopher Haines *	3,157	51.4	+12.2
Labour	Tim Page	1,511	24.6	–5.6
UKIP	James Faulkner	1,175	19.1	–6.8
Green	Howard John March	304	4.9	N/A
Majority		1,646	26.9	+17.8
Turnout		6,147	66.15	+26.17
Registered electors		9,292		
Conservative hold		Swing		

=== Walcot & Park North ===
Walcot & Park North
Party	Candidate	Votes	%	±%
Labour	Emma Bushell	2,506	47.5	+8.2
Conservative	Ellen Heavens	1,400	26.5	+7.0
UKIP	Jeff Jefferies	839	15.9	–12.9
Green	Bill Hughes	253	4.8	–1.1
Liberal Democrats	Kathleen McCarthy	226	4.3	–1.8
SDP	Pavlos Chatzinopoulos	50	0.9	+0.4
Majority		1,106	21.1	+10.5
Turnout		5,274	57.27	+25.27
Registered electors		9,209		
Labour hold		Swing		

=== Wroughton & Wichelstowe ===
Wroughton & Wichelstowe
Party	Candidate	Votes	%	±%
Conservative	Cathy Martyn	1,797	39.3	+6.0
Liberal Democrats	Ann Richards *	1,184	25.9	+7.1
Labour	Cheryl Lewis	733	16.0	+2.2
UKIP	Susan Short	546	11.9	–6.6
Green	Chantelle Amy Smith	194	4.2	–6.6
Independent	John Francis Newman	116	2.5	–2.3
Majority		613	13.5	–1.0
Turnout		4,570	72.15	–31.07
Registered electors		6,334		
Conservative gain from Liberal Democrats		Swing		
