= 2022 Swindon Borough Council election =

- 5 May 2022

19 of the 57 seats to Swindon Borough Council 29 seats needed for a majority
| | First party | Second party |
|---|---|---|
| Party | Conservative | Labour |
| Seats before | 37 | 20 |
| Seats won | 7 | 12 |
| Seats after | 34 | 23 |
| Seat change | ▼3 | ▲3 |
| Popular vote | 22,987 | 24,751 |
| Percentage | 42.7% | 46.0% |
- Map of the results of the 2022 Swindon council election. Conservatives in blue and Labour in red. Wards in grey had no election in 2022.
Council control before election
Conservative
Council control after election
Conservative

Elections to Swindon Borough Council took place on 5 May 2022 as part of the 2022 local elections in the United Kingdom. The Conservatives lost 3 seats but maintained their majority control of the council.

== Results summary ==
2022 Swindon Borough Council election
| Party | This election | | | | Full council | | | This election | | |
| Party | Candidates | Seats | Net | Seats % | Other | Total | Total % | Votes | Votes % | +/− |
|---|---|---|---|---|---|---|---|---|---|---|
| Conservative | {{{candidates}}} | 7 | ▼3 | 36.8 | 27 | 34 | 59.6 | 22,987 | 42.7 | ▼6.2 |
| Labour | {{{candidates}}} | 12 | ▲3 | 63.2 | 11 | 23 | 40.4 | 24,751 | 46.0 | ▲13.7 |
| Liberal Democrats | {{{candidates}}} | 0 | Steady | 0.0 | 0 | 0 | 0.0 | 3,559 | 6.6 | ▼1.1 |
| Green | {{{candidates}}} | 0 | Steady | 0.0 | 0 | 0 | 0.0 | 2,272 | 4.2 | ▼2.1 |
| TUSC | {{{candidates}}} | 0 | Steady | 0.0 | 0 | 0 | 0.0 | 204 | 0.4 | N/A |

== Ward results ==
Note: Vote share change is calculated based on the last time these seats were fought in 2018.

=== Blunsdon & Highworth ===
Blunsdon & Highworth
| Party | Candidate | Votes | % | ±% |
|---|---|---|---|---|
| Conservative | Steven Mark Weisinger * | 1,715 | 53.7 | −2.90 |
| Labour Co-op | Lesley Ann Gow | 1,024 | 32.0 | +2.01 |
| Green | Andrew Donald Day | 457 | 14.3 | +8.21 |
| Majority | | 691 | 21.6 | |
| Turnout | | 3,212 | 36.06 | |
| Registered electors | | 8,908 | | |
| Conservative hold | | Swing | | |

=== Central ===
Central
| Party | Candidate | Votes | % | ±% |
|---|---|---|---|---|
| Conservative | Anabelle Patricia Pegado | 1,983 | 49.1 | +31.96 |
| Labour Co-op | Junab Ali * | 1,813 | 44.9 | −26.60 |
| Liberal Democrats | Hannah Louise Pajak | 236 | 5.8 | +0.67 |
| Majority | | 170 | 4.2 | N/A |
| Turnout | | 4,066 | 40.92 | |
| Registered electors | | 9,937 | | |
| Conservative gain from Labour Co-op | | Swing | | |

=== Chiseldon & Lawn ===
Chiseldon & Lawn
| Party | Candidate | Votes | % | ±% |
|---|---|---|---|---|
| Conservative | Lawrence Elliott | 996 | 44.6 | −10.38 |
| Labour | Mike Davies | 775 | 34.5 | +13.29 |
| Liberal Democrats | Fareed Ahmed Quidwai | 463 | 20.7 | +12.90 |
| Majority | | 221 | 9.9 | |
| Turnout | | 2,250 | 37.28 | |
| Registered electors | | 6,035 | | |
| Conservative hold | | Swing | | |

=== Covingham & Dorcan ===
Covingham & Dorcan
| Party | Candidate | Votes | % | ±% |
|---|---|---|---|---|
| Conservative | Kevin James Parry * | 1,846 | 61.2 | −6.24 |
| Labour | Tomas William Silberberg | 895 | 29.7 | +5.82 |
| Liberal Democrats | Geoffrey Harry King | 199 | 6.6 | +3.36 |
| TUSC | Scott Victor Abbas Hunter | 78 | 2.6 | +2.6 |
| Majority | | 951 | 31.5 | |
| Turnout | | 3,030 | 36.51 | |
| Registered electors | | 8,300 | | |
| Conservative hold | | Swing | | |

=== Eastcott ===
Eastcott
| Party | Candidate | Votes | % | ±% |
|---|---|---|---|---|
| Labour Co-op | Imtiyaz Shaikh * | 1,606 | 48.3 | +2.32 |
| Liberal Democrats | Stan Pajak | 1,135 | 34.1 | −3.98 |
| Conservative | Bhawna Goyal | 587 | 17.6 | +7.15 |
| Majority | | 471 | 14.2 | |
| Turnout | | 3,358 | 42.29 | |
| Registered electors | | 7,941 | | |
| Labour Co-op hold | | Swing | | |

=== Gorse Hill & Pinehurst ===
Gorse Hill & Pinehurst
| Party | Candidate | Votes | % | ±% |
|---|---|---|---|---|
| Labour | Carol Hannah Shelley * | 1,647 | 60.9 | +8.10 |
| Conservative | Alex Hughes | 1,059 | 39.1 | +8.83 |
| Majority | | 588 | 21.7 | |
| Turnout | | 2,731 | 29.72 | |
| Registered electors | | 9,190 | | |
| Labour hold | | Swing | | |

=== Haydon Wick ===
Haydon Wick
| Party | Candidate | Votes | % | ±% |
|---|---|---|---|---|
| Labour | Matthew Lodge | 1,353 | 51.5 | +13.22 |
| Conservative | Bose Patrick-Okoh | 1,274 | 48.5 | −0.96 |
| Majority | | 79 | 3.0 | N/A |
| Turnout | | 2,653 | 29.94 | |
| Registered electors | | 8,861 | | |
| Labour gain from Conservative | | Swing | | |

=== Liden, Eldene & Park South ===
Liden, Eldene & Park South
| Party | Candidate | Votes | % | ±% |
|---|---|---|---|---|
| Labour Co-op | Janine Howarth * | 1,388 | 54.4 | +10.20 |
| Conservative | Zachary Jay Hawson | 1,163 | 45.6 | +4.52 |
| Majority | | 225 | 8.8 | |
| Turnout | | 2,565 | 31.94 | |
| Registered electors | | 8,031 | | |
| Labour Co-op hold | | Swing | | |

=== Lydiard & Freshbrook ===
Lydiard & Freshbrook
| Party | Candidate | Votes | % | ±% |
|---|---|---|---|---|
| Labour | Sean Wilson | 1,331 | 49.4 | +8.59 |
| Conservative | Luke Eric Dawson | 1,235 | 45.9 | −2.79 |
| TUSC | Rob Pettefar | 126 | 4.7 | +4.7 |
| Majority | | 96 | 3.6 | N/A |
| Turnout | | 2,715 | 33.39 | |
| Registered electors | | 8,132 | | |
| Labour gain from Conservative | | Swing | | |

=== Mannington & Western ===
Mannington & Western
| Party | Candidate | Votes | % | ±% |
|---|---|---|---|---|
| Labour Co-op | Jim Robbins * | 1,364 | 61.9 | +4.24 |
| Conservative | Gyan Prasad Gurung | 665 | 30.2 | +3.30 |
| Liberal Democrats | Fraser McCormick | 175 | 7.9 | +3.09 |
| Majority | | 699 | 31.7 | |
| Turnout | | 2,220 | 29.82 | |
| Registered electors | | 7,444 | | |
| Labour Co-op hold | | Swing | | |

=== Old Town ===
Old Town
| Party | Candidate | Votes | % | ±% |
|---|---|---|---|---|
| Labour | Nadine Carol Watts * | 2,032 | 62.5 | +12.08 |
| Conservative | Sumon Chandra Roy | 868 | 26.7 | −14.41 |
| Green | Bill Hughes | 197 | 6.1 | +2.49 |
| Liberal Democrats | Martin Wiltshire | 154 | 4.7 | +1.45 |
| Majority | | 1,164 | 35.8 | |
| Turnout | | 3,265 | 41.04 | |
| Registered electors | | 7,955 | | |
| Labour hold | | Swing | | |

=== Penhill & Upper Stratton ===
Penhill & Upper Stratton
| Party | Candidate | Votes | % | ±% |
|---|---|---|---|---|
| Labour | Claire Crilly * | 1,336 | 51.8 | +3.02 |
| Conservative | Ola Ibitoye | 1,068 | 41.4 | +3.22 |
| Liberal Democrats | Michelle Horrobin | 177 | 6.9 | +2.46 |
| Majority | | 268 | 10.4 | |
| Turnout | | 2,589 | 28.18 | |
| Registered electors | | 9,186 | | |
| Labour hold | | Swing | | |

=== Priory Vale ===
Priory Vale
| Party | Candidate | Votes | % | ±% |
|---|---|---|---|---|
| Labour | Robert Andrew Heath | 1,144 | 50.3 | +23.27 |
| Conservative | Kate Tomlinson * | 1,130 | 49.7 | −10.93 |
| Majority | | 14 | 0.6 | N/A |
| Turnout | | 2,296 | 26.63 | |
| Registered electors | | 8,621 | | |
| Labour gain from Conservative | | Swing | | |

=== Rodbourne Cheney ===
Rodbourne Cheney
| Party | Candidate | Votes | % | ±% |
|---|---|---|---|---|
| Labour | William Lewis Stone * | 1,604 | 56.5 | +3.13 |
| Conservative | Omkar Munagala | 1,040 | 36.6 | +3.60 |
| Green | Roderick George Hebden-Leeder | 197 | 6.9 | +2.34 |
| Majority | | 564 | 19.9 | |
| Turnout | | 2,852 | 31.32 | |
| Registered electors | | 9,107 | | |
| Labour hold | | Swing | | |

=== Shaw ===
Shaw
| Party | Candidate | Votes | % | ±% |
|---|---|---|---|---|
| Conservative | Suresha Gattapur | 1,270 | 48.6 | +2.54 |
| Labour | Zohaib Ali Tariq | 921 | 35.2 | −5.44 |
| Green | Ken Kimber | 424 | 16.2 | +11.92 |
| Majority | | 349 | 13.3 | |
| Turnout | | 2,631 | 33.08 | |
| Registered electors | | 7,953 | | |
| Conservative hold | | Swing | | |

=== St Andrews ===
St Andrews
| Party | Candidate | Votes | % | ±% |
|---|---|---|---|---|
| Conservative | Jake Edward Chandler * | 1,390 | 42.2 | −11.82 |
| Labour | Jason John Mills | 1,147 | 34.8 | +4.89 |
| Green | Bradley Martyn Williams | 757 | 23.0 | +16.48 |
| Majority | | 243 | 7.4 | |
| Turnout | | 3,302 | 26.31 | |
| Registered electors | | 12,552 | | |
| Conservative hold | | Swing | | |

=== St Margaret & South Marston ===
St Margaret & South Marston
| Party | Candidate | Votes | % | ±% |
|---|---|---|---|---|
| Labour Co-op | Pamela Lesley Adams | 1,497 | 51.6 | +10.60 |
| Conservative | Roger Arthur Smith * | 1,405 | 48.4 | −0.71 |
| Majority | | 92 | 3.2 | N/A |
| Turnout | | 2,954 | 32.69 | |
| Registered electors | | 9,036 | | |
| Labour Co-op gain from Conservative | | Swing | | |

=== Walcot & Park North ===
Walcot & Park North
| Party | Candidate | Votes | % | ±% |
|---|---|---|---|---|
| Labour Co-op | Abdul Amin * | 1,492 | 50.8 | −4.68 |
| Conservative | Agnelo Estrocio | 1,159 | 39.5 | +9.99 |
| Liberal Democrats | Dawn Elizabeth Pajak | 286 | 9.7 | +4.48 |
| Majority | | 333 | 11.3 | |
| Turnout | | 2,955 | 33.16 | |
| Registered electors | | 8,910 | | |
| Labour Co-op hold | | Swing | | |

=== Wroughton & Wichelstowe ===
Wroughton & Wichelstowe
| Party | Candidate | Votes | % | ±% |
|---|---|---|---|---|
| Conservative | David George Curtis Martyn | 1,134 | 45.5 | +9.68 |
| Liberal Democrats | Adam Charles Poole | 734 | 29.5 | −6.63 |
| Labour | Sam James | 382 | 15.3 | +1.87 |
| Green | Pippa Fairbourn | 240 | 9.6 | |
| Majority | | 400 | 16.1 | |
| Turnout | | 2,500 | 38.15 | |
| Registered electors | | 6,553 | | |
| Conservative hold | | Swing | | |
