= 2021 Swindon Borough Council election =

2021 Swindon Borough Council Election
- 6 May 2021

21 of the 57 seats to Swindon Borough Council 29 seats needed for a majority
	First party	Second party	Third party
Party	Conservative	Labour	Liberal Democrats
Seats before	30	24	2
Seats won	16	5	0
Seats after	36	20	0
Seat change	▲6	▼4	▼2
Popular vote	31,282	20,692	4,926
Percentage	48.9%	32.3%	7.7%
- Winner in each ward for the 2021 Swindon Borough Council election
Council control before election
Conservatives
Council control after election
Conservatives

Elections to Swindon Borough Council took place on 6 May 2021 as part of the 2021 local elections in the United Kingdom. The Conservatives made 6 gains and secured a majority of 15, their best performance since the 2011 elections.

== Results summary ==
2021 Swindon Borough Council election
Party	This election				Full council			This election		
Party	Candidates	Seats	Net	Seats %	Other	Total	Total %	Votes	Votes %	+/−
Conservative	{{{candidates}}}	16	▲6	76.2	20	36	63.2	31,282	48.9	▲9.3
Labour	{{{candidates}}}	5	▼4	23.8	15	20	35.1	20,692	32.3	▼6.9
Liberal Democrats	{{{candidates}}}	0	▼2	0.0	0	0	0.0	4,926	7.7	▲1.2
Green	{{{candidates}}}	0	Steady	0.0	0	0	0.0	4,037	6.3	▼0.4
Independent	{{{candidates}}}	0	Steady	0.0	1	1	0.2	2,957	4.6	▲3.7
For Britain	{{{candidates}}}	0	Steady	0.0	0	0	0.0	46	0.1	New
Libertarian	{{{candidates}}}	0	Steady	0.0	0	0	0.0	23	0.0	New

== Ward results ==
=== Blunsdon & Highworth ===
Blunsdon & Highworth
Party	Candidate	Votes	%	±%
Conservative	Vijay Kumar Manro	2,073	56.9	+4.7
Labour	Keir Baynham	867	23.8	Steady
Green	Andrew Day	442	12.1	−2.2
Liberal Democrats	Michael Heal	137	3.8	−5.0
Independent	Tara Hurst	126	3.5	n/a
Majority		1,206	33.1	+4.8
Turnout		3,645	40.9	+3.2
Conservative hold		Swing	+2.35	

=== Central ===
Central
Party	Candidate	Votes	%	±%
Conservative	Lourenco Fernandes	2,230	51.45	+36.8
Labour	Rajhia Ali	1,603	36.99	−31.0
Liberal Democrats	Garry Porter	242	5.58	−4.0
Independent	Helen Dunn	193	4.45	n/a
Majority		627	14.47	
Turnout		4,334	44.42	+3.6
Conservative gain from Labour		Swing	+33.9	

=== Chiseldon & Lawn ===
Chiseldon & Lawn
Party	Candidate	Votes	%	±%
Conservative	William Horley	1,384	54.60	+3.8
Labour	Mohammad Khatib	539	21.26	−2.0
Green	Paul Sunners	299	11.79	−14.1
Liberal Democrats	Fareed Ahmed Quidwai	197	7.77	n/a
Independent	Wayne Barrowman	99	3.91	n/a
Majority		845	33.33	+8.4
Turnout		2535	42.48	+4.0
Conservative hold		Swing	+2.9	

=== Covingham & Dorcan ===
Covingham & Dorcan
Party	Candidate	Votes	%	±%
Conservative	Barbara Parry	2,254	68.01	+7.2
Labour	Ronald Wilson	779	23.51	−2.6
Liberal Democrats	Ionel Tamas	137	4.13	n/a
Independent	Clare Bartholomew	122	3.68	n/a
Majority		1,475	44.51	+9.8
Turnout		3,314	39.96	+4.9
Conservative hold		Swing	+4.9	

=== Eastcott ===
Eastcott
Party	Candidate	Votes	%	±%
Labour	Marina Strinkovsky	1,315	38.76	−13.2
Liberal Democrats	Stan Pajak	1,271	37.46	+4.0
Conservative	Bhawna Goyal	682	20.10	+11.6
Independent	Leslie Valat-Desgranges	102	3.00	n/a
Majority		44	1.30	
Turnout		3,393	43.23	+5.2
Labour gain from Liberal Democrats		Swing	-8.6	

=== Gorse Hill & Pinehurst ===
Gorse Hill & Pinehurst
Party	Candidate	Votes	%	±%
Labour	Ray Ballman	1,406	45.66	−6.4
Conservative	Carl Jones	1,134	36.83	+16.8
Green	Andy Bentley	291	9.45	−1.6
Liberal Democrats	Joseph Polson	118	3.83	n/a
Independent	Andrew Osborne	71	2.31	
Majority		272	8.83	−21.3
Turnout		3,079	33.31	+4.3
Labour hold		Swing	-11.6	

=== Haydon Wick ===
Haydon Wick
Party	Candidate	Votes	%	±%
Conservative	John Jackson	1,469	43.69	−6.4
Independent	Oliver Donachie (Note: previously elected as a Conservative, became independent in 2020)	896	26.65	n/a
Labour	Daniel Davis	739	21.98	−6.1
Green	Jacek Zmarzlik	191	5.68	−3.4
Independent	Vincent Montgomery	49	1.46	n/a
Majority		573	17.04	−5.0
Turnout		3,362	37.79	+4.9
Conservative hold		Swing	-16.6	

=== Liden, Eldene & Park South ===
Liden, Eldene & Park South
Party	Candidate	Votes	%	±%
Conservative	Curtis Flux	1,475	50.20	+15.8
Labour	Steve Allsopp	1,173	39.93	−5.1
Liberal Democrats	Malcolm Salmon	145	4.94	−1.1
Independent	Martin Costello	123	4.19	n/a
Majority		302	10.28	
Turnout		2,938	36.58	+3.0
Conservative gain from Labour		Swing	+10.5	

=== Lydiard & Freshbrook ===
Lydiard & Freshbrook
Party	Candidate	Votes	%	±%
Conservative	Matty Courtliff (Note: previously elected for the Labour Party, joined the Conservative Party in 2019)	1,644	51.76	−0.6
Labour	Patricia Philpot	1,011	31.83	−15.9
Green	Glynis Hales	200	6.30	n/a
Liberal Democrats	Chris Shepherd	170	5.35	n/a
Independent	Julie Jones	126	3.97	n/a
Majority		633	19.93	
Turnout		3,176	38.26	+3.3
Conservative gain from Labour		Swing		

=== Mannington & Western ===
Mannington & Western
Party	Candidate	Votes	%	±%
Labour	Kevin Small	1,184	45.04	−6.0
Conservative	Suresha Gattapur	1,052	40.02	+13.8
Green	Nicky Iddon	163	6.20	n/a
Liberal Democrats	Deborah King	87	3.31	−6.4
Independent	Deborah Fine	71	2.70	n/a
For Britain	Ian Baxter	46	1.75	n/a
Majority		132	5.02	−19.8
Turnout		2,629	34.98	+4.0
Labour hold		Swing	-9.9	

=== Old Town ===
Old Town
Party	Candidate	Votes	%	±%
Labour	Jane Milner-Barry	1,781	51.04	+12.5
Conservative	Lawrence Elliott	1,196	34.28	+4.7
Green	Bill Hughes	210	6.02	−3.2
Liberal Democrats	Martin Wiltshire	194	5.56	−2.4
Independent	Stephen Woodham	59	1.69	n/a
Libertarian	Tim Almond	23	0.66	n/a
Majority		585	16.77	
Turnout		3,489	44.24	+4.9
Labour hold		Swing	+3.9	

=== Penhill & Upper Stratton ===
Penhill & Upper Stratton
Party	Candidate	Votes	%	±%
Conservative	Dan Smith	1,262	44.94	+3.4
Labour	Ravi Venkatesh	1,130	40.24	+10.2
Green	Kate Henery	155	5.52	−1.1
Liberal Democrats	Michelle Horrobin	114	4.06	−0.1
Independent	Daniel Legg	102	3.63	n/a
Majority		132	4.70	
Turnout		2,808	30.48	+1.3
Conservative gain from Labour		Swing	+3.4	

=== Priory Vale ===
Priory Vale
Party	Candidate	Votes	%	±%
Conservative	Jo Morris Golds	1,470	53.85	−5.5
Labour	Ian Edwards	891	32.64	−8.0
Green	Stephen Litchfield	211	7.73	n/a
Independent	Elena Mari	138	5.05	n/a
Majority		579	21.21	+2.4
Turnout		2,730	31.43	+4.7
Conservative hold		Swing		

=== Ridgeway ===
Ridgeway
Party	Candidate	Votes	%	±%
Conservative	Gary Sumner	1,004	72.60	
Liberal Democrats	Fiona McAnespie	199	14.39	
Labour	Sam James	144	10.41	
Independent	Kevin Ritchie	30	2.17	
Majority		805	58.21	
Turnout		1,383	51.72	
Conservative hold		Swing		

=== Rodbourne Cheney ===
Rodbourne Cheney
Party	Candidate	Votes	%	±%
Conservative	Sudha Nukana	1,396	45.49	+7.2
Labour	Pam Adams	1,224	39.88	−6.4
Green	Rob Hebden-Leeder	222	7.23	n/a
Independent	Alexandra Pearce	105	3.42	n/a
Liberal Democrats	Geoffrey King	87	2.83	n/a
Majority		172	5.60	
Turnout		3,069	33.68	+4.4
Conservative gain from Labour		Swing	+6.8	

=== Shaw ===
Shaw
Party	Candidate	Votes	%	±%
Conservative	Keith Williams	1,718	56.11	+11.9
Labour	Tom Smith	872	28.48	−5.5
Green	Ken Kimber	356	11.63	−0.4
Independent	Johnathan da Silva	102	3.33	n/a
Majority		846	27.63	+17.4
Turnout		3,062	38.05	+2.1
Conservative hold		Swing	+8.7	

=== St Andrew's ===
St Andrews
Party	Candidate	Votes	%	±%
Conservative	Daniel Adams	2,078	55.47	+3.7
Labour	Jason Mills	936	24.99	−1.5
Green	Bradley Williams	555	14.82	−6.9
Independent	Beverly Elmer	153	4.08	n/a
Majority		1,142	30.49	+5.2
Turnout		3,746	30.58	+3.6
Conservative hold		Swing	+2.6	

=== St Margaret & South Marston ===
St Margaret & South Marston
Party	Candidate	Votes	%	±%
Conservative	Russell Holland	1,984	56.54	+11.9
Labour	Barrie Jennings	1,207	34.40	−8.8
Green	Kate Freeman	195	5.56	n/a
Independent	Sarah Benham	106	3.02	n/a
Majority		777	22.14	+20.7
Turnout		3,509	39.22	+3.8
Conservative hold		Swing	+10.4	

=== Walcot & Park North ===
Walcot & Park North
Party	Candidate	Votes	%	±%
Labour	Mohammed Miah	1,619	55.81	+2.2
Conservative	Francisco Goes	895	30.85	+7.1
Liberal Democrats	Dawn Pajak	235	8.10	−1.4
Independent	Sharon Newham	138	4.76	n/a
Majority		724	24.96	−4.8
Turnout		2,901	32.84	+2.8
Labour hold		Swing	+4.7	

=== Wroughton & Wichelstowe ===
Wroughton & Wichelstowe (2 Seats)
Party	Candidate	Votes	%	±%
Conservative	Brian Ford	1,547	52.00	+3.8
Conservative	David Martyn	1,335	44.87	
Liberal Democrats	Martin Barrett	858	28.84	−0.9
Liberal Democrats	Adam Poole	735	24.71	
Green	Pippa Fairbourn	341	11.46	+2.9
Labour	Md Hamid	257	8.64	−0.4
Green	Simon Fairbourn	206	6.92	
Labour	Zohaib Tariq	195	6.55	
Independent	Shanti Mabberley	46	1.55	n/a
Majority		477	16.03	−0.5
Turnout		2,975	46.51	+4.0
Conservative hold		Swing	+2.4	
Conservative gain from Liberal Democrats		Swing		

== By-elections ==
=== Priory Vale ===
Priory Vale: 24 June 2021
Party	Candidate	Votes	%	±%
Conservative	Kate Tomlinson	1,139	60.6	+6.9
Labour	Ian Edwards	508	27.0	−5.6
Liberal Democrats	Joseph Polson	102	5.4	n/a
Green	Steve Litchfield	83	4.4	−3.4
Independent	Elena Mari	47	2.5	−2.6
Majority		631	33.6	+12.4
Turnout		1,882	22.0	−9.4
Conservative hold		Swing	+6.3	
