= 2016 Swindon Borough Council election =

2016 UK local government election

Map of the results of the 2016 Swindon council election. Conservatives in blue, Labour in red and Liberal Democrats in yellow. Wards in grey were not contested in 2016.

The 2016 Swindon Borough Council election took place on 5 May 2016 to elect members of Swindon Borough Council in England. This was on the same day as other local elections.

The Conservatives held on to their majority on the council but it was lowered to three after losing councillors to Labour in Lydiard & Freshbrook and Liden, Eldene & Park South.

== Results by ward ==
An asterisk * indicates an incumbent seeking re-election

=== Blunsdon & Highworth ===
Blunsdon & Highworth
Party	Candidate	Votes	%	±%
Conservative	Maureen Rita Penny*	1,624	47.4	
Labour	Alison Mary Durrant	1,053	30.7	
UKIP	John Fairlamb Short	429	12.5	
Green	Andrew Donald Day	200	5.8	
Liberal Democrats	Geoffrey King	121	3.5	
Majority		571	16.7	
Turnout		3,427	40	
Conservative hold		Swing		

=== Central ===
Central
Party	Candidate	Votes	%	±%
Labour	Robert Stanley Wright*	2,459	74.4	
Conservative	Jack Lindsey Howard	554	16.8	
Liberal Democrats	Ann Richards	291	8.8	
Majority		1905	57.6	
Turnout		3,304	39	
Labour hold		Swing		

=== Covingham & Dorcan ===
Covingham & Dorcan
Party	Candidate	Votes	%	±%
Conservative	Barbara Samantha Parry	1,329	41.9	
Labour	Mohammad Jamal Miah	706	22.3	
UKIP	Brian James Osbourn	569	17.9	
Independent	Anthony Hillier	387	12.2	
Liberal Democrats	Margaret Hooper	94	3.0	
Green	Christopher John Noyce	87	2.7	
Majority		623	19.6	
Turnout		3,172	38	
Conservative hold		Swing		

=== Eastcott ===
Eastcott
Party	Candidate	Votes	%	±%
Liberal Democrats	Stanley James Pajak*	1,248	44.8	
Labour	Manetta Martha Rodrigues	1,020	36.6	
Conservative	Drusilla Summers	258	9.3	
Green	Andrew Hedley John Bentley	132	4.7	
UKIP	Terence Hayward	128	4.6	
Majority		228	8.2	
Turnout		2786	40	
Liberal Democrats hold		Swing		

=== Gorse Hill & Pinehurst ===
Gorse Hill & Pinehurst
Party	Candidate	Votes	%	±%
Labour	Ericqua Raymone Ballman*	1,454	55.8	
Conservative	Benjamin Prizeman	797	30.6	
Green	Francesca Victoria Annelise Hebden-Leeder	241	9.3	
Liberal Democrats	Zoe Claire McCormick	112	4.3	
Majority		657	25.2	
Turnout		2,604	35	

=== Haydon Wick ===
Haydon Wick
Party	Candidate	Votes	%	±%
Conservative	Oliver Donachie	1,319	47.6	
Labour	Michelle Jean Agostino	765	27.6	
UKIP	Edmund James Gerrard	436	15.7	
Green	Andrew Francis	149	5.4	
Liberal Democrats	Margaret Mistry	101	3.6	
Majority		554	20.0	
Turnout		2,770	32	

=== Liden, Eldene & Park South ===
Liden, Eldene & Park South
Party	Candidate	Votes	%	±%
Labour	Fay Howard*	1,138	43.60	
Conservative	Oladapo Ibitoye	725	27.78	
UKIP	Robert Sheppard	537	20.57	
Green	David Miles	112	4.29	
Liberal Democrats	Clive Hooper	98	3.75	
Majority		413	15.82	
Turnout		2610	33	

=== Lydiard & Freshbrook ===
Lydiard & Freshbrook
Party	Candidate	Votes	%	±%
Labour	Matthew Courtliff	1,421	48.15	
Conservative	Diane Rodgers	1266	42.9	
Liberal Democrats	James Farr	264	8.95	
Majority		155	5.25	
Turnout		2951	37	
Labour hold		Swing		

=== Mannington and Western ===
Mannington and Western
Party	Candidate	Votes	%	±%
Labour	Kevin Small*	1,105	51.66	
Conservative	Nicholas Burns-Howell	726	33.94	
Green	Livio Pavone	173	8.09	
Liberal Democrats	Alex Hegenbarth	135	6.31	
Majority		379	17.72	
Turnout		2139	31	
Labour hold		Swing		

=== Old Town ===
Old Town
Party	Candidate	Votes	%	±%
Labour	Jane Ballard	1,363	47.29	
Conservative	Brian Mattock	1062	36.85	
UKIP	Terence Davis	208	7.22	
Green	John Hughes	144	5.00	
Liberal Democrats	Garry Porter	105	3.64	
Majority		301	10.44	
Turnout		2882	38	
Labour hold		Swing		

=== Penhill & Upper Stratton ===
Penhill & Upper Stratton
Party	Candidate	Votes	%	±%
Labour	Mark Edward Dempsey	1,190	45.9	
Conservative	Raymond William Fisher	834	32.2	
UKIP	Jennifer Mary Jefferies	476	18.4	
Liberal Democrats	Raymond Martin James	92	3.5	
Majority		356	13.7	
Turnout		2,592	30	

=== Priory Vale ===
Priory Vale
Party	Candidate	Votes	%	±%
Conservative	Malcolm Davies	1,131	54.77	
Labour	Robert Heath	505	24.45	
UKIP	Gary Belben	258	12.49	
Liberal Democrats	Gerard Taylor	88	4.26	
Green	Simon Fairbourn	83	4.02	
Majority		626	30.32	
Turnout		2065	26	
Conservative hold		Swing		

=== Ridgeway ===
Ridgeway
Party	Candidate	Votes	%	±%
Conservative	Gary Sumner	669	59.0	
Liberal Democrats	Fiona Mcanespie	232	20.5	
Labour	Samuel Thomas James	108	9.5	
UKIP	Juan Pablo Kosidowski	82	7.2	
Green	Paul Sunners	43	3.8	
Majority		437	38.5	
Turnout		1,134	46	

=== Rodbourne Cheney ===
Rodbourne Cheney
Party	Candidate	Votes	%	±%
Labour	Des Moffatt	1,660	62.76	
Conservative	Stephanie Clark	695	26.28	
Green	Roderick Hebden-Leeder	181	6.84	
Liberal Democrats	Fraser McCormick	109	4.12	
Majority		965	36.48	
Turnout		2645	30	
Labour hold		Swing		

=== Shaw ===
Shaw
Party	Candidate	Votes	%	±%
Conservative	Keith Williams	1,268	50.84	
Labour	Graham Philpot	840	33.68	
Green	Nigel Kimber	221	8.86	
Liberal Democrats	Nicholas Roberts	165	6.62	
Majority		428	17.16	
Turnout		2494	32	
Conservative hold		Swing		

=== St Andrews ===
St Andrews
Party	Candidate	Votes	%	±%
Conservative	Vera Tomlinson	1,360	59.83	
Labour	Maura Clarke	519	22.83	
UKIP	Susan Short	249	10.95	
Liberal Democrats	Deborah King	145	6.38	
Majority		841	37.0	
Turnout		2273	29	
Conservative hold		Swing		

=== St Margaret & South Marston ===
St Margaret and South Marston
Party	Candidate	Votes	%	±%
Conservative	Russell Holland	1,409	49.65	
Labour	Andrew Pedersen	880	31.00	
UKIP	Michael Viret	393	13.85	
Liberal Democrats	Dawn Pajak	81	2.85	
Green	Howard March	75	2.64	
Majority		529	18.65	
Turnout		2838	32	
Conservative hold		Swing		

=== Walcot & Park North ===
Walcot & Park North
Party	Candidate	Votes	%	±%
Labour	Stephen Allsopp	1,424	53.35	
Conservative	Ellen Heavens	563	21.09	
UKIP	Stephen Halden	432	16.19	
Liberal Democrats	Kathleen McCarthy	151	5.66	
Green	Jennifer Miles	86	3.22	
Social Democratic Party (UK)	Paulos Chatzinopoulos	13	0.49	
Majority		861	32.26	
Turnout		2669	32	
Labour hold		Swing		

=== Wroughton & Wichelstowe ===
Wroughton & Wichelstowe
Party	Candidate	Votes	%	±%
Conservative	Brian Ford	1,212	54.62	
Green	Talis Kimberley-Fairbourn	326	14.69	
Labour	Imtiyaz Shaikh	305	13.74	
UKIP	Malcolm Jefferies	258	11.63	
Liberal Democrats	Christopher Shepherd	118	5.31	
Majority		886	39.93	
Turnout		2219	38	
Conservative hold		Swing		
