= 2023 Swindon Borough Council election =

- 4 May 2023

19 of the 57 seats to Swindon Borough Council 29 seats needed for a majority

	First party	Second party
Leader	David Renard (defeated)	Jim Robbins
Party	Conservative	Labour
Seats before	32	23
Seats won	2	16
Seats after	22	33
Seat change	▼10	▲9
	Third party	Fourth party
Party	Liberal Democrats	Independent
Seats before	0	1
Seats won	1	0
Seats after	1	1
Seat change	▲1	Steady
- Map of the results of the 2023 Swindon council election. Conservatives in blue and Labour in red. Wards in grey had no election in 2023.
Leader before election
David Renard
Conservative
Leader after election
Jim Robbins
Labour

The 2023 Swindon Borough Council election took place on 4 May 2023 to elect councillors to Swindon Borough Council in Wiltshire, England. This was on the same day as other local elections across England. There were 19 of the 57 seats on the council up for election.

Prior to the election the Conservatives held a majority of the seats on the council. At the election Labour took control of the council, and the Conservative leader, David Renard, lost his seat.

== Summary ==
=== Election results ===
2023 Swindon Council election
Party	This election				Full council			This election		
Party	Candidates	Seats	Net	Seats %	Other	Total	Total %	Votes	Votes %	+/−
Labour	{{{candidates}}}	16	▲9	84.2	17	33	57.9	29,901	51.9	+5.9
Conservative	{{{candidates}}}	2	▼10	10.5	20	22	38.6	19,977	34.7	-8.0
Liberal Democrats	{{{candidates}}}	1	▲1	5.3	0	1	1.8	4,563	7.9	+1.3
Independent	{{{candidates}}}	0	Steady	0.0	1	1	1.8	259	0.4	N/A
Green	{{{candidates}}}	0	Steady	0.0	0	0	0.0	2,824	4.9	+0.7
TUSC	{{{candidates}}}	0	Steady	0.0	0	0	0.0	138	0.2	-0.2

== Ward results ==
The Statement of Persons Nominated, which details the candidates standing in each ward, was released by Swindon Borough Council following the close of nomination on 5 April 2023.

The results were as follows:

=== Blunsdon & Highworth ===
Blundson and Highworth
Party	Candidate	Votes	%	±%
Conservative	Nick Gardiner	1,509	45.2	−8.5
Labour Co-op	Lesley Ann Gow	1,168	35.0	+3.0
Green	Andrew Day	418	12.5	−1.8
Liberal Democrats	Deborah King	241	7.2	N/A
Majority		341		
Turnout		3,372	37.39	
Registered electors		9,019		
Conservative hold		Swing		

=== Central ===
Central
Party	Candidate	Votes	%	±%
Labour	Adorabelle Amaral-Shaikh*	2,960	61.8	+16.9
Conservative	John Barreto	1,577	32.9	−16.2
Liberal Democrats	Hannah Pajak	177	3.7	−2.1
Independent	Mariano Rodrigues	73	1.5	N/A
Majority		1,383		
Turnout		4,813	46.96	
Registered electors		10,249		
Labour hold		Swing		

=== Chiseldon & Lawn ===
Chiseldon & Lawn
Party	Candidate	Votes	%	±%
Labour Co-op	Neil Lawrence Hopkins	1,376	51.2	+16.7
Conservative	Jenny Mary Jeffries*	1,010	37.6	−7.0
Liberal Democrats	Fareed Ahmed Quidwai	299	11.1	−9.6
Majority		366		
Turnout		2,711	43.52	
Registered electors		6,229		
Labour Co-op gain from Conservative		Swing		

=== Covingham & Dorcan ===
Covingham & Dorcan
Party	Candidate	Votes	%	±%
Conservative	Dale Heenan*	1,302	46.2	−15.0
Labour	Tate Pullen	1,133	40.2	+10.5
Liberal Democrats	Malcolm Salmon	178	6.3	−0.3
Green	Howard March	162	5.8	N/A
TUSC	Scott Hunter	41	1.5	−1.1
Majority		169		
Turnout		2,834	34.22	
Registered electors		8,281		
Conservative hold				

=== Eastcott ===
Eastcott
Party	Candidate	Votes	%	±%
Labour Co-op	Paul Andrew Dixon*	1,919	60.0	+11.7
Liberal Democrats	Stan Pajak	714	22.3	−11.8
Conservative	Raul Fernandes	417	13.0	−4.6
Green	Chris Noyce	148	4.6	N/A
Majority		1,205		
Turnout		3,225	40.37	
Registered electors		7,989		
Labour Co-op hold		Swing		

=== Gorse Hill & Pinehurst ===
Gorse Hill & Pinehurst
Party	Candidate	Votes	%	±%
Labour	John Ballman*	1,600	56.5	−4.4
Conservative	Brenda Victoria Fernandes	941	33.2	−5.9
Green	Andy Bentley	205	7.2	N/A
Liberal Democrats	Zubair Farooq Khan	85	3.0	N/A
Majority		659		
Turnout		3,225	30.94	
Registered electors		9,211		
Labour hold		Swing		

=== Haydon Wick ===
Haydon Wick
Party	Candidate	Votes	%	±%
Labour Co-op	Stanka Adamcova	1,828	57.3	+5.8
Conservative	David Charles Renard*	1,176	36.8	−11.7
Liberal Democrats	Omar Syed Muhammad	188	5.9	N/A
Majority		652		
Turnout		3,216	36.73	
Registered electors		8,756		
Labour gain from Conservative		Swing		

=== Liden, Eldene & Park South ===
Liden, Eldene & Park South
Party	Candidate	Votes	%	±%
Labour	Mike Davies	1,575	58.6	+4.2
Conservative	Bazil Stanley Solomon*	974	36.3	−9.3
Liberal Democrats	Caroline Thomas	137	5.1	N/A
Majority		601		
Turnout		2,709	33.74	
Registered electors		8,028		
Labour gain from Conservative		Swing		

=== Lydiard & Freshbrook ===
Lydiard & Freshbrook
Party	Candidate	Votes	%	±%
Labour	Repi Begum	1,489	52.7	+3.3
Conservative	Caryl Sydney-Smith*	1,098	38.8	−7.1
Liberal Democrats	Bilal Quidwai	143	5.1	N/A
TUSC	Rob Pettefar	97	3.4	−1.3
Majority		391		
Turnout		2,875	35.62	
Registered electors		8,071		
Labour gain from Conservative				

=== Mannington & Western ===
Mannington & Western
Party	Candidate	Votes	%	±%
Labour Co-op	Fay Howard	1,495	65.1	+3.2
Conservative	Roy Stephen	632	27.5	−2.7
Liberal Democrats	Fraser Graham McCormick	169	7.4	−0.5
Majority		863		
Turnout		2,327	31.05	
Registered electors		7,495		
Labour Co-op hold		Swing		

=== Old Town ===
Old Town
Party	Candidate	Votes	%	±%
Labour	Chris Watts	2,047	64.5	+2.0
Conservative	Ellen Heavens	717	22.6	−4.1
Green	Bill Hughes	222	7.0	+0.9
Liberal Democrats	Martin Wiltshire	190	6.0	+1.3
Majority		1,330		
Turnout		3,192	39.39	
Registered electors		8,104		
Labour gain from Conservative				

=== Penhill & Upper Stratton ===
Penhill & Upper Stratton
Party	Candidate	Votes	%	±%
Labour Co-op	Ravi Venkatesh	1,452	53.2	+1.4
Conservative	David Ibitoye*	1,045	38.3	−3.1
Liberal Democrats	Michelle Horrobin	231	8.5	+1.6
Majority		407		
Turnout		2,744	30.14	
Registered electors		9,104		
Labour Co-op gain from Conservative				

=== Priory Vale ===
Priory Vale
Party	Candidate	Votes	%	±%
Labour Co-op	Rajhia Ali	1,357	47.6	−2.7
Conservative	Vinay Manro*	1,200	42.1	−7.2
Green	Lorna Terry	173	6.1	N/A
Liberal Democrats	Geoffrey King	121	4.2	N/A
Majority		157		
Turnout		2,868	33.13	
Registered electors		8,657		
Labour Co-op gain from Conservative				

=== Rodbourne Cheney ===
Rodbourne Cheney
Party	Candidate	Votes	%	±%
Labour	Jim Patrick Grant*	1,649	60.5	+4.0
Conservative	Siddu Vempati	762	28.0	−8.6
Green	Rod Hebden	190	7.0	+0.1
Liberal Democrats	Zoe Claire McCormick	124	4.6	N/A
Majority		881		
Turnout		2,739	29.85	
Registered electors		9,177		
Labour hold		Swing		

=== Shaw ===
Shaw
Party	Candidate	Votes	%	±%
Labour Co-op	Junab Ali	1,525	49.2	+14.0
Conservative	Nandini Singh	1,309	42.2	−6.4
Liberal Democrats	Michael Dickinson	267	8.6	N/A
Majority		216		
Turnout		3,130	39.2	
Registered electors		7,984		
Labour Co-op gain from Conservative		Swing		

=== St Andrews ===
St Andrews
Party	Candidate	Votes	%	±%
Labour	Jason Mills	1,525	40.4	+5.6
Conservative	Steve Heyes*	1,305	34.6	−7.6
Green	Bradley Williams	829	22.0	−1.0
Liberal Democrats	Ebad Syed	117	3.1	N/A
Majority		220	5.8	N/A
Turnout		3,791	29.75	
Registered electors		12,741		
Labour gain from Conservative				

=== St Margaret & South Marston ===
St Margaret and South Marston
Party	Candidate	Votes	%	±%
Labour	Thomas Butcher	1,645	49.8	−1.8
Conservative	Matthew Vallender	1,289	39.0	−9.4
Green	Ella March	224	6.8	N/A
Liberal Democrats	Chris Shepherd	148	4.5	N/A
Majority		356	10.65	
Turnout		3,340	36.18	
Registered electors		9,232		
Labour gain from Conservative				

=== Walcot & Park North ===
Walcot & Park North
Party	Candidate	Votes	%	±%
Labour	Emma Bushell*	1,681	58.2	+7.4
Conservative	Angelo Estrocio	860	29.8	−9.7
Independent	David Norris	186	6.4	N/A
Liberal Democrats	Dawn Pajak	160	5.5	−4.2
Majority		821		
Turnout		2,898	32.55	
Registered electors		8,902		
Labour Co-op hold		Swing		

=== Wroughton and Wichelstowe ===
Wroughton and Wichelstowe
Party	Candidate	Votes	%	±%
Liberal Democrats	Adam Poole	874	35.6	+6.1
Conservative	Gayle Cook	854	34.7	−10.8
Labour	Saleh Ahmed	477	19.4	+4.1
Green	Pippa Fairbourn	253	10.3	+0.7
Majority		20		
Turnout		2,475	37.21	
Registered electors		6,651		
Liberal Democrats gain from Conservative				

== By-elections ==
=== St Margaret & South Marston ===
St Margaret & South Marston: 20 July 2023
Party	Candidate	Votes	%	±%
Conservative	Matthew Thomas Vallender	1,143	50.6	+11.6
Labour	Joseph Paul George Polson	1,118	49.4	−0.4
Turnout		2,278	24.65	
Registered electors		9,240		
Conservative gain from Labour				

The St Margaret and South Marston by-election was triggered by the death of Labour councillor Pam Adams.
