= 2019 Swindon Borough Council election =

2019 Swindon Borough Council Election
- 2 May 2019

19 of the 57 seats to Swindon Borough Council 29 seats needed for a majority
	First party	Second party	Third party
Party	Conservative	Labour	Liberal Democrats
Seats before	31	23	2
Seats won	12	7	0
Seats after	32	22	2
Seat change	▲1	▼1	Steady
Popular vote	20,574	20,361	3,364
Percentage	39.6%	39.2%	6.5%
- Winner in each ward for the 2019 Swindon Borough Council election. Grey signifies uncontested.
Council control before election
Conservatives
Council control after election
Conservatives

The 2019 Swindon Borough Council election took place on 2 May 2019, to elect members of Swindon Borough Council in England. This was on the same day as other local elections.

== Results summary ==
2019 Swindon Borough Council election
Party	This election				Full council			This election		
Party	Candidates	Seats	Net	Seats %	Other	Total	Total %	Votes	Votes %	+/−
Conservative	{{{candidates}}}	12	▲1	63.2	20	32	57.1	20,574	39.6	-1.8
Labour	{{{candidates}}}	7	▼1	36.8	15	22	39.3	20,361	39.2	-3.2
Liberal Democrats	{{{candidates}}}	0	Steady	0.0	2	2	3.6	3,364	6.5	-1.2
UKIP	{{{candidates}}}	0	Steady	0.0	0	0	0.0	3,682	7.1	+3.2
Green	{{{candidates}}}	0	Steady	0.0	0	0	0.0	3,452	6.7	+2.1
Independent	{{{candidates}}}	0	Steady	0.0	0	0	0.0	468	0.9	New

== Ward results ==
=== Blunsdon & Highworth ===
Blunsdon & Highworth
Party	Candidate	Votes	%	±%
Conservative	Alan Bishop	1,654	52.1	−4.5
Labour	Jamie Cope	756	23.8	−6.2
Green	Andrew Day	453	14.3	+8.2
Liberal Democrats	Malcolm Salmon	312	9.8	+5.7
Majority		898	28.3	
Turnout		3,175	37.7	
Conservative hold		Swing		

=== Central ===
Central
Party	Candidate	Votes	%	±%
Labour	Adorabelle Shaikh	2,454	67.9	−3.7
Conservative	Mohammad Chowdhury	531	14.7	−2.5
Liberal Democrats	Raymond James	348	9.6	+4.4
Green	Bob Heritage	283	7.8	+4.2
Majority		1,923	53.2	
Turnout		3,616	38.8	
Labour hold		Swing		

=== Chiseldon & Lawn ===
Chiseldon & Lawn
Party	Candidate	Votes	%	±%
Conservative	Jenny Jefferies	1,079	50.8	−2.9
Green	Paul Sunners	549	25.9	+17.2
Labour	Peter Bates	494	23.3	−4.0
Majority		530	24.9	
Turnout		2,122	38.5	
Conservative hold		Swing		

=== Covingham & Dorcan ===
Covingham & Dorcan
Party	Candidate	Votes	%	±%
Conservative	Dale Heenan	1,742	60.8	−6.6
Labour	Tom Smith	747	26.1	−2.3
UKIP	Melanie Bailey	374	13.1	+10.2
Majority		995	34.7	
Turnout		2,863	35.1	
Conservative hold		Swing		

=== Eastcott ===
Eastcott
Party	Candidate	Votes	%	±%
Labour	Paul Dixon	1,506	52.0	+6.1
Liberal Democrats	Toby Robson	971	33.5	−4.6
Conservative	Victoria Pratt	245	8.5	−2.0
UKIP	Susan Day	174	6.0	+3.8
Majority		535	18.5	
Turnout		2,896	38.0	
Labour hold		Swing		

=== Gorse Hill & Pinehurst ===
Gorse Hill & Pinehurst
Party	Candidate	Votes	%	±%
Labour	John Ballman	1,327	52.1	−0.7
Conservative	Adam John	560	22.0	−8.3
UKIP	Aubrey Attwater	379	14.9	+7.6
Green	Andy Bentley	282	11.1	+5.0
Majority		767	30.1	
Turnout		2,548	29.0	
Labour hold		Swing		

=== Haydon Wick ===
Haydon Wick
Party	Candidate	Votes	%	±%
Conservative	David Renard	1,436	50.1	+0.6
Labour	Stanka Adamcova	806	28.1	−10.2
UKIP	Ed Gerrard	364	12.7	+8.6
Green	Jacek Zmarzlik	262	9.1	+3.0
Majority		630	22.0	
Turnout		2,868	32.9	
Conservative hold		Swing		

=== Liden, Eldene & Park South ===
Liden, Eldene & Park South
Party	Candidate	Votes	%	±%
Labour	Bazil Solomon	1,196	45.0	+0.8
Conservative	Zachary Hawson	914	34.4	−6.7
UKIP	Martin Costello	387	14.6	+7.6
Liberal Democrats	Krista Salmon	160	6.0	+1.3
Majority		282	10.6	
Turnout		2,657	33.6	
Labour hold		Swing		

=== Lydiard & Freshbrook ===
Lydiard & Freshbrook
Party	Candidate	Votes	%	±%
Conservative	Caryl Sydney-Smith	1,433	52.3	+3.6
Labour	Trish Philpot	1,309	47.7	+6.8
Majority		124	4.6	
Turnout		2,742	34.9	
Conservative hold		Swing		

=== Mannington & Western ===
Mannington & Western
Party	Candidate	Votes	%	±%
Labour	Steph Exell	1,116	51.0	−6.6
Conservative	John Lenton	573	26.2	−0.7
UKIP	Sheila Attwater	289	13.2	+7.8
Liberal Democrats	Fraser McCormick	212	9.7	+4.9
Majority		543	24.8	
Turnout		2,190	31.0	
Labour hold		Swing		

=== Old Town ===
Old Town
Party	Candidate	Votes	%	±%
Conservative	Nick Burns-Howell	1,167	39.0	−2.1
Labour	Neil Hopkins	1,152	38.5	−11.9
Green	Bill Hughes	274	9.2	+5.6
Liberal Democrats	Peter Oliver	239	8.0	+4.7
UKIP	Jason Costello	158	5.3	+3.7
Majority		15	0.5	
Turnout		2,990	39.3	
Conservative hold		Swing		

=== Penhill & Upper Stratton ===
Penhill & Upper Stratton
Party	Candidate	Votes	%	±%
Conservative	David Ibitoye	1,086	41.5	+3.3
Labour	Kate Linnegar	785	30.0	−18.7
Independent	Teresa Page	468	17.9	New
Green	Katharine Henery	172	6.6	+3.7
Liberal Democrats	Michelle Horrobin	109	4.2	−0.2
Majority		301	11.5	
Turnout		2,620	29.2	
Conservative gain from Labour		Swing		

=== Priory Vale ===
Priory Vale
Party	Candidate	Votes	%	±%
Conservative	Vinay Manro	1,260	59.4	+0.7
Labour	Ravikumar Venkatesh	860	40.6	+11.4
Majority		400	18.8	
Turnout		2,120	26.8	
Conservative hold		Swing		

=== Rodbourne Cheney ===
Rodbourne Cheney
Party	Candidate	Votes	%	±%
Labour	Jim Grant	1,185	46.3	−7.0
Conservative	Jake Chandler	981	38.3	+5.3
UKIP	Mark Edes	395	15.4	+9.9
Majority		204	8.0	
Turnout		2,561	29.3	
Labour hold		Swing		

=== Shaw ===
Shaw
Party	Candidate	Votes	%	±%
Conservative	Nick Martin	1,248	44.2	−1.8
Labour	John Firth	961	34.0	−6.7
Green	Ken Kimber	338	12.0	+7.7
UKIP	Adrian Costello	278	9.8	+5.7
Majority		287	10.2	
Turnout		2,825	36.0	
Conservative hold		Swing		

=== St. Andrew's ===
St. Andrew's
Party	Candidate	Votes	%	±%
Conservative	Steve Hayes	1,476	51.8	−3.0
Labour	Thomas Craigie	754	26.5	−2.9
Green	Steven Pipe	617	21.7	+15.3
Majority		722	25.3	
Turnout		2,847	27.0	
Conservative hold		Swing		

=== St. Margaret & South Marston ===
St. Margaret & South Marston
Party	Candidate	Votes	%	±%
Conservative	Robert Jandy	1,381	44.6	−5.3
Labour	Barrie Jennings	1,336	43.2	+1.5
UKIP	Andy Osbourne	378	12.2	+9.1
Majority		45	1.4	
Turnout		3,095	35.4	
Conservative hold		Swing		

=== Walcot & Park North ===
Walcot & Park North
Party	Candidate	Votes	%	±%
Labour	Emma Bushell	1,384	53.6	−1.9
Conservative	Roy Stephen	615	23.8	−5.7
UKIP	Steve Halden	339	13.1	+7.1
Liberal Democrats	Dawn Pajak	245	9.5	+4.2
Majority		769	29.8	
Turnout			30.0	
Labour hold		Swing		

=== Wroughton & Wichelstowe ===
Wroughton & Wichelstowe
Party	Candidate	Votes	%	±%
Conservative	Cathy Martyn	1,193	46.2	+10.3
Liberal Democrats	Jamie Taylor	768	29.7	−6.4
Labour	Sam James	233	9.0	−4.5
Green	Andrew Francis	222	8.6	−3.1
UKIP	Lincoln Williams	167	6.5	+3.7
Majority		425	16.5	
Turnout		2,583	42.5	
Conservative hold		Swing		
