= 2014 Swindon Borough Council election =

2014 UK local government election

Map of the results of the 2014 Swindon council election. Conservatives in blue, Labour in red and Liberal Democrats in yellow. Wards in grey were not contested in 2014.

The 2014 Swindon Borough Council election took place on 22 May 2014 to elect members of Swindon Borough Council in England. This was on the same day as other local elections. The Conservatives gained 1 seat to retain control of the council.

== Overall result ==
Swindon Council Election, 2014
Party	Seats	Gains	Losses	Net gain/loss	Seats %	Votes %	Votes	+/−
Conservative	30	1	0	+ 1	52.6			
Labour	23	0	1	1	40.4			
Liberal Democrats	4	0	0	0	7.0			
UKIP	0	0	0	0	0.0			
Green	0	0	0	0	0.0			
Independent	0	0	0	0	0.0			
Total	57							

== Ward Elections ==
The results of the election are:

=== Blunsdon & Highworth Ward ===
Blunsdon & Highworth Ward
Party	Candidate	Votes	%	±%
Conservative	Steve Weisinger	1,689	48.1	+3.3
Labour	Phil Beaumont	831	23.7	–7.6
UKIP	Ross Shugar	621	17.7	N/A
Green	Andrew Donald Day	245	7.0	–6.0
Liberal Democrats	Clive Hooper	125	3.6	–7.4
Majority		858	24.4	N/A
Turnout		3,521	40.19	+5.96
Registered electors		8,760		
Conservative hold		Swing		

=== Central Ward ===
Central Ward
Party	Candidate	Votes	%	±%
Labour	Junab Ali*	1,386	38.0	–32.1
Liberal Democrats	Imtiyaz Shaikh	1,189	32.6	+25.4
Conservative	Timothy Michael French	495	13.6	+0.8
UKIP	Brian David Stone	454	12.4	N/A
Independent	Nicholas Gary Kearns	127	3.5	N/A
Majority		197	5.4	N/A
Turnout		3,686	39.72	+8.72
Registered electors		9,281		
Labour hold		Swing		

=== Chiseldon & Lawn Ward ===
Chiseldon & Lawn Ward
Party	Candidate	Votes	%	±%
Conservative	Eric Shaw	911	44.3	+1.5
UKIP	Jennifer Mary Jefferies	457	22.2	N/A
Labour	Irene Anne Cooke	373	18.1	+0.5
Green	Paul Sunners	207	10.1	N/A
Liberal Democrats	Raymond James	109	5.3	–5.7
Majority		454	22.1	N/A
Turnout		2,067	44.08	+2.35
Registered electors		4,666		
Conservative hold		Swing		

=== Covingham & Dorcan Ward ===
Covingham & Dorcan Ward
Party	Candidate	Votes	%	±%
Conservative	Kevin James Parry	1,449	39.1	–1.9
Labour	Julian Charles Price *	1,186	32.0	–4.5
UKIP	Brian James Osbourn	926	25.0	+8.2
Green	Chantelle Smith	141	3.8	N/A
Majority		263	7.1	N/A
Turnout		3,712	41.82	+4.49
Registered electors		8,877		
Conservative gain from Labour		Swing		

=== Eastcott Ward ===
Eastcott Ward
Party	Candidate	Votes	%	±%
Liberal Democrats	Dave Wood *	1,308	44.0	–5.6
Labour	Emma Bushell	930	31.3	–3.4
UKIP	Terence Richard Davis	278	9.3	N/A
Conservative	David Malcolm Bell	263	8.8	+0.5
Green	John Valentine Hughes	195	6.6	–0.8
Majority		378	12.67	N/A
Turnout		2,984	38.69	+2.99
Registered electors		7,712		
Liberal Democrats hold		Swing		

=== Gorse Hill & Pinehurst Ward ===
Gorse Hill & Pinehurst Ward
Party	Candidate	Votes	%	±%
Labour	Carol Hannah Shelley	1,152	39.4	–28.1
UKIP	Ian Christopher Robertson-Molden	791	27.0	N/A
Conservative	Edward Mark Gillams	716	24.5	+3.1
Green	Stephen Thompson	266	9.1	N/A
Majority		361	12.3	N/A
Turnout		2,930	32.49	+6.34
Registered electors		9,019		
Labour hold		Swing		

=== Haydon Wick Ward ===
Haydon Wick Ward
Party	Candidate	Votes	%	±%
Conservative	Garry John Perkins	1,209	37.9	–5.7
Labour	Maura Julia Clarke	1,019	32.0	+0.8
UKIP	Edmund Gerrard	816	25.6	+15.0
Liberal Democrats	Garry Porter	145	4.5	–1.8
Majority		190	6.0	N/A
Turnout		3,208	34.74	+2.16
Registered electors		9,235		
Conservative hold		Swing		

=== Liden, Eldene & Park South Ward ===
Liden, Eldene & Park South Ward
Party	Candidate	Votes	%	±%
Labour	Derique Joseph Montaut *	978	34.9	–7.8
Conservative	Graham Charles Cherry	807	28.8	–4.8
UKIP	Robert William Sheppard	798	28.4	+11.6
Green	David Christopher Miles	129	4.6	N/A
Liberal Democrats	Hannah Pajak McCance	94	3.3	–3.7
Majority		171	6.1	N/A
Turnout		2820	32.54	–0.33
Registered electors		8,666		
Labour hold		Swing		

=== Lydiard & Freshbrook Ward ===
Lydiard & Freshbrook Ward
Party	Candidate	Votes	%	±%
Conservative	Timothy Swinyard	1,190	36.9	+2.1
Labour	Mohammed Jamal Miah	925	28.7	–2.7
UKIP	John Lenton	791	24.5	+12.0
Liberal Democrats	Christopher Shepherd	178	5.5	–5.3
Green	Livio Pavone	140	4.3	–6.2
Majority		265	8.2	N/A
Turnout		3,236	37.61	+4.23
Registered electors		8,605		
Conservative hold		Swing		

=== Mannington & Western Ward ===
Mannington & Western Ward
Party	Candidate	Votes	%	±%
Labour	James Robbins *	977	42.7	–8.6
UKIP	Lincoln Williams	598	26.1	N/A
Conservative	Caryl Sydney-Smith	561	24.5	–0.6
Liberal Democrats	Geoffrey Kin	152	6.6	–2.8
Majority		379	16.6	N/A
Turnout		2,308	30.93	+4.60
Registered electors		7,463		
Labour hold		Swing		

=== Old Town Ward ===
Old Town Ward
Party	Candidate	Votes	%	±%
Labour	Nadine Watts *	1,352	45.8	+20.8
Conservative	Claire Ellis	1,067	36.1	–5.1
UKIP	John Short	365	12.4	+5.2
Liberal Democrats	Deborah King	171	5.8	–3.0
Majority		285	9.6	N/A
Turnout		2,960	37.76	+3.17
Registered electors		7,838		
Labour hold		Swing		

=== Penhill & Upper Stratton Ward ===
Penhill & Upper Stratton Ward
Party	Candidate	Votes	%	±%
Labour	Joseph Tray *	1,195	40.8	–22.1
UKIP	David Rowland	872	29.7	N/A
Conservative	Harriet Maltby	712	24.3	–4.9
Green	Robert Heritage	153	5.2	N/A
Majority		323	11.0	N/A
Turnout		2,942	31.14	+2.31
Registered electors		9,449		
Labour hold		Swing		

=== Priory Vale Ward ===
Priory Vale Ward
Party	Candidate	Votes	%	±%
Conservative	Emma Faramarzi *	1,232	50.9	–6.3
UKIP	Balbir Virik	519	21.4	+7.0
Labour	Michelle Agostino	513	21.2	–0.5
Liberal Democrats	Margaret Hooper	158	6.5	–0.3
Majority		713	29.4	N/A
Turnout		2,435	28.15	+4.67
Registered electors		8,651		
Conservative hold		Swing		

=== Rodbourne Cheney Ward ===
Rodbourne Cheney Ward
Party	Candidate	Votes	%	±%
Labour	Peter Watts *	1,305	43.3	–18.2
UKIP	Peter Thompson-Watt	859	28.6	N/A
Conservative	Diane Rodgers	668	22.2	–9.1
Green	Simon Fairbourn	174	5.8	N/A
Majority		446	14.8	N/A
Turnout		3,026	35.76	+5.64
Registered electors		8,463		
Labour hold		Swing		

=== Shaw Ward ===
Shaw Ward
Party	Candidate	Votes	%	±%
Conservative	Dwynwen Mary Martin	1,122	36.5	–13.0
Labour	Stephanie Exell	862	28.0	–4.1
UKIP	Christopher Tyler	552	17.9	N/A
Independent	Richard Symonds	223	7.3	N/A
Green	Nigel Kimber	203	6.6	N/A
Liberal Democrats	James Farr	113	3.7	–7.4
Majority		260	8.5	N/A
Turnout		3,084	36.44	+7.73
Registered electors		8,463		
Conservative hold		Swing		

=== St Andrews Ward ===
St Andrews Ward (2 seats)
Party	Candidate	Votes	%	±%
Conservative	Gemma McCracken	1,164	51.5	–11.4
Conservative	Mary Friend *	1,124	–	
Labour	Jason Mills	502	22.2	–7.0
Labour	John Keepin	491	–	
UKIP	Gary Belben	421	18.6	N/A
UKIP	Anthony Garrett	405	–	
Liberal Democrats	Margaret Mistry	172	7.6	–0.3
Turnout		2,196	27.36	+2.92
Registered electors		8,027		
Conservative hold		Swing		
Conservative hold		Swing		

Extra vacancy caused by the resignation of Peter Heaton-Jones

=== St Margaret & South Marston Ward ===
St Margaret & South Marston Ward
Party	Candidate	Votes	%	±%
Conservative	Colin Lovell *	1,351	39.2	–6.5
Labour	Christopher Watts	1,039	30.2	–2.5
UKIP	James Faulkner	893	25.9	N/A
Liberal Democrats	Clive Puckey	160	4.6	–2.8
Majority		312	9.1	N/A
Turnout		3,459	39.98	+9.83
Registered electors		8,651		
Conservative hold		Swing		

=== Walcot & Park North Ward ===
Walcot & Park North Ward
Party	Candidate	Votes	%	±%
Labour	Abdul Amin *	1,144	39.3	–8.7
UKIP	Melanie Stanbury	837	28.8	+16.3
Conservative	Emily Pryor	566	19.5	+0.5
Liberal Democrats	Kathleen McCarthy	177	6.1	–1.8
Green	Jennifer Miles	171	5.9	–3.1
SDP	Pavlos Chatzinopoulos	14	0.5	N/A
Majority		307	10.6	N/A
Turnout		2,920	32.00	+3.3
Registered electors		9,124		
Labour hold		Swing		

=== Wroughton & Wichelstowe Ward ===
Wroughton & Wichelstowe Ward
Party	Candidate	Votes	%	±%
Conservative	Wayne Crabbe *	867	33.3	+1.4
Liberal Democrats	Georgina Akers	490	18.8	–9.4
UKIP	Susan Short	483	18.5	N/A
Labour	Paul Dixon	360	13.8	–0.6
Green	Talis Kimberley-Fairbourn	281	10.8	+5.6
Independent	John Newman	124	4.8	N/A
Majority		377	14.5	N/A
Turnout		2,620	41.08	+3.71
Registered electors		6,378		
Conservative hold		Swing		
