= Swindon Borough Council elections =

Local government elections in Wiltshire, England

Swindon Borough Council is the local authority for the unitary authority of Swindon in Wiltshire, England. Until 1 April 1997 its area was a non-metropolitan district called Thamesdown, with Wiltshire County Council providing the county-level services.

== Election results ==
Composition of the council
Year	Conservative	Labour	Liberal Democrats (Note: Includes totals for the predecessors of the Liberal Democrats, the Liberal Party and SDP (both of which participated in the Alliance).)	Reform	Independents & Others	Council control after election
Local government reorganisation; council established (46 seats)
1973	18	26	0	–	2	Labour
New ward boundaries (46 seats)
1976	22	21	1	–	2	No overall control
1978	20	24	1	–	1	Labour
1979	19	26	0	–	1	Labour
1980	14	31	0	–	1	Labour
New ward boundaries (49 seats)
1982	14	32	2	–	1	Labour
1983	16	30	2	–	1	Labour
1984	15	31	2	–	1	Labour
New ward boundaries (54 seats)
1986	12	38	3	–	1	Labour
1987	12	35	6	–	1	Labour
1988	11	36	6	–	1	Labour
1990	10	39	4	–	1	Labour
1991	9	39	5	–	1	Labour
1992	14	33	6	–	1	Labour
1994	12	33	8	–	1	Labour
1995	8	37	8	–	1	Labour
1996	3	41	9	–	1	Labour
Thamesdown becomes a unitary authority, named changed to Swindon (54 seats)
1998	5	40	9	–	0	Labour
1999	5	39	10	–	0	Labour
New ward boundaries (59 seats)
2000	23	28	8	–	0	No overall control
2002	22	29	8	–	0	No overall control
2003	29	22	8	–	0	No overall control
2004	32	20	7	–	0	Conservative
2006	40	14	3	–	2	Conservative
2007	43	13	3	–	0	Conservative
2008	42	12	3	–	2	Conservative
2010	41	13	4	–	1	Conservative
2011	38	17	4	–	0	Conservative
New ward boundaries (59 seats)
2012	29	24	4	–	0	Conservative
2014	30	23	4	–	0	Conservative
New ward boundaries (59 seats)
2015	32	23	2	–	0	Conservative
2016	30	25	2	–	0	Conservative
2018	29	26	2	–	0	Conservative
2019	32	22	2	–	0	Conservative
2021	36	20	0	–	1	Conservative
2022	34	23	0	–	0	Conservative
2023	22	33	1	–	1	Labour
2024	15	41	1	–	0	Labour
New ward boundaries (57 seats)
2026	23	19	1	14	0	No overall control

== District council ==
- 1973 Thamesdown Borough Council election
- 1976 Thamesdown Borough Council election (New ward boundaries)
- 1978 Thamesdown Borough Council election
- 1979 Thamesdown Borough Council election
- 1980 Thamesdown Borough Council election
- 1982 Thamesdown Borough Council election (Some new ward boundaries & borough boundary changes)
- 1983 Thamesdown Borough Council election
- 1984 Thamesdown Borough Council election
- 1986 Thamesdown Borough Council election (New ward boundaries)
- 1987 Thamesdown Borough Council election
- 1988 Thamesdown Borough Council election
- 1990 Thamesdown Borough Council election
- 1991 Thamesdown Borough Council election
- 1992 Thamesdown Borough Council election
- 1994 Thamesdown Borough Council election
- 1995 Thamesdown Borough Council election
- 1996 Thamesdown Borough Council election

== Unitary authority ==
- 1998 Swindon Borough Council election
- 1999 Swindon Borough Council election
- 2000 Swindon Borough Council election (New ward boundaries increased the number of seats by 5)
- 2002 Swindon Borough Council election
- 2003 Swindon Borough Council election
- 2004 Swindon Borough Council election
- 2006 Swindon Borough Council election
- 2007 Swindon Borough Council election
- 2008 Swindon Borough Council election
- 2010 Swindon Borough Council election
- 2011 Swindon Borough Council election
- 2012 Swindon Borough Council election (New ward boundaries)
- 2014 Swindon Borough Council election
- 2015 Swindon Borough Council election (New ward boundaries)
- 2016 Swindon Borough Council election
- 2018 Swindon Borough Council election
- 2019 Swindon Borough Council election
- 2021 Swindon Borough Council election
- 2022 Swindon Borough Council election
- 2023 Swindon Borough Council election
- 2024 Swindon Borough Council election
- 2026 Swindon Borough Council election (New ward boundaries)

== Results maps ==
2000 results map

2002 results map

2003 results map

2004 results map

2006 results map

2007 results map

2008 results map

2010 results map

2011 results map

2012 results map

2014 results map

2015 results map

2016 results map

2018 results map

2019 results map

2021 results map

2022 results map

2023 results map

2024 results map

2026 results map

== By-election results ==
A by-election for the Central ward took place on 15 May 1997. It was won by the Labour Party.

1997 Central by-election
Party	Candidate	Votes	%	±%
Labour		548	46.3	
Liberal Democrats		300	25.3	
Conservative		224	18.9	
Green		69	5.8	
Socialist Labour		44	53.7.8	
Majority		248	21.0	
Turnout		1,185	20.7	
Labour hold		Swing		

A by-election for the Parks ward took place on 21 August 1997. It was won by the Labour Party.

1997 Parks by-election
Party	Candidate	Votes	%	±%
Labour		715	66.0	−4.4
Conservative		297	27.4	+11.2
Liberal Democrats		72	6.6	−6.8
Majority		418	38.6	
Turnout		1,084	15.2	
Labour hold		Swing		

A by-election for the St Margaret ward took place on 30 January 2003. It was won by the Conservative Party.

2003 St Margaret by-election
Party	Candidate	Votes	%	±%
Conservative	Raymond Fisher	814	52.5	+5.3
Labour		409	26.4	−13.2
Liberal Democrats		258	16.6	+3.4
UKIP		69	4.5	+4.5
Majority		405	26.1	
Turnout		1,550	20.6	
Conservative gain from Labour		Swing		

A by-election for the Central ward took place on 22 January 2004. It was won by the Labour Party.

2004 Central by-election
Party	Candidate	Votes	%	±%
Labour		513	37.9	+0.3
Liberal Democrats		359	26.5	−12.1
Conservative		229	16.9	−0.6
SA		119	8.8	+8.8
Green		71	5.2	+5.2
SOU		41	3.0	−3.2
UKIP		21	1.6	+1.6
Majority		154	11.4	
Turnout		1,353	19.4	
Labour hold		Swing		

A by-election for the Western ward took place on 22 January 2004. It was won by the Labour Party.

2004 Western by-election
Party	Candidate	Votes	%	±%
Labour		829	47.5	+4.2
Conservative		651	37.3	+11.3
Liberal Democrats		154	8.8	−13.5
UKIP		79	4.5	−3.9
Green		34	1.9	+1.9
Majority		178	10.2	
Turnout		1,747	23.5	
Labour hold		Swing		

A by-election for the Walcot ward took place on 3 February 2005. It was won by the Labour Party.

2005 Walcot by-election
Party	Candidate	Votes	%	±%
Labour	Peter Mallinson	706	38.4	−3.4
Conservative		586	31.9	−1.8
Liberal Democrats		338	18.4	+1.2
Independent		106	5.8	+5.8
Green		60	3.3	−3.9
UKIP		43	2.3	+2.3
Majority		120	6.5	
Turnout		1,839	35.0	
Labour gain from Conservative		Swing		

A by-election for the Moredon ward took place on 4 November 2010. It was won by the Labour Party.

2010 Moredon by-election
Party	Candidate	Votes	%	±%
Labour	Jenny Millin	887	47.5	+12.6
Conservative	Toby Elliott	755	40.4	+1.0
UKIP	William Oram	129	6.9	+6.9
Liberal Democrats	Chris Ward	98	5.2	−13.3
Majority		132	7.1	
Turnout		1,869	23.7	
Labour gain from Conservative		Swing		

A by-election for the Blunsdon and Highworth ward took place on 15 November 2012. It was won by the Conservative Party.

2012 Blunsdon and Highworth by-election
Party	Candidate	Votes	%	±%
Conservative	Steve Weisinger	1,453		
Labour	Phil Beaumont	1,075		
UKIP	John Lenton	195		
Green	Andrew Donald Day	111		
Liberal Democrats	Cath Smith	23		
Majority		378		
Turnout			32.6	
Conservative hold		Swing		

A by-election for the Haydon Wick ward took place on 8 August 2013. It was won by the Conservative Party.

2013 Haydon Wick by-election
Party	Candidate	Votes	%	±%
Conservative	Oliver Donachie	1,376	49.6	+6.0
Labour	Maura Clarke	887	32.0	+0.8
UKIP	Ed Gerrard	426	15.4	+4.8
Liberal Democrats	Sean Davey	83	3.0	−3.3
Majority		489	17.6	
Turnout		2,772		
Conservative hold		Swing		

A by-election for the Priory Vale ward took place on 24 June 2021. It was won by the Conservative Party.

2021 Priory Vale by-election
Party	Candidate	Votes	%	±%
Conservative	Kate Tomlinson	1,139	60.6	+6.4
Labour	Ian Edwards	508	27.0	−5.9
Liberal Democrats	Joseph Polson	102	5.4	+5.4
Green	Stephen Litchfield	83	4.4	−3.4
Independent	Elena Mari	47	2.5	+2.5
Majority		631	33.6	
Turnout		1,879		
Conservative hold		Swing		

A by-election for the St Margaret and South Marston ward took place on 20 July 2023. It was won by the Conservative Party.

2023 St Margaret and South Marston by-election
Party	Candidate	Votes	%	±%
Conservative	Matthew Vallender	1,143	50.6	+11.6
Labour	Joseph Polson	1,118	49.4	−0.4
Majority		25	1.2	
Turnout		2,261		
Conservative gain from Labour		Swing		

A by-election for the Rodbourne Cheney ward took place on 17 October 2024. It was won by the Conservative Party.

2024 Rodbourne Cheney by-election
Party	Candidate	Votes	%	±%
Conservative	Sudha Nukana	991	48.6	+15.6
Labour	Meural Cardoso	694	34.0	−19.8
Green	Roderick Hebden	173	8.5	−0.3
Independent	Alex Petrarche	100	4.9	+4.9
Liberal Democrats	Ciaran Skinner	82	4.0	−0.5
Majority		297	14.6	
Turnout		2,040		
Conservative gain from Labour		Swing		
