= 2003 Swindon Borough Council election =

2003 UK local government election

Map of the results of the 2003 Swindon council election. Conservatives in blue, Labour in red and Liberal Democrats in yellow. Wards in grey were not contested in 2003.

The 2003 Swindon Borough Council election took place on 1 May 2003 to elect members of Swindon Unitary Council in Wiltshire, England. One third of the council was up for election and the council stayed under no overall control.

After the election, the composition of the council was

- Conservative 29
- Labour 22
- Liberal Democrat 8

== Voting trial ==
Swindon was one of 3 councils which trialed voting by television in 2003 for the first time anywhere in the world. Voters in Swindon also had 8 electronic information kiosks in the town centre where they could vote, telephone and internet voting. These trials, which were open for voting in the week before the election, followed a trial of electronic voting in the 2002 election which saw turnout increase by 3.5%.

Overall turnout in the election was 29.82%, lower than in 2002. However the number of electronic votes increased by 75% from 2002 to 11,055, including 349 cast by television.

== Election result ==
Swindon local election result 2003
Party	Seats	Gains	Losses	Net gain/loss	Seats %	Votes %	Votes	+/−
Conservative	12			+6	60.0	41.8	16,983	+3.2%
Labour	5			-6	25.0	30.7	12,455	-3.5%
Liberal Democrats	3			0	15.0	25.3	10,287	+1.0%
Socialist Alliance	0			0	0	0.7	289	+0.3%
UKIP	0			0	0	0.7	265	+0.7%
Green	0			0	0	0.6	232	-1.2%
Swindon Org UK People Before Profit	0			0	0	0.3	102	+0.3%

== Ward results ==
Abbey Meads
Party	Candidate	Votes	%	±%
Conservative	Peter Stoddart	651	64.9	−5.5
Liberal Democrats	Derek Richards	182	18.1	+8.0
Labour	Ruairi Tobin	170	16.9	−2.6
Majority		469	46.8	−4.1
Turnout		1,003	24.0	−4.9

Central
Party	Candidate	Votes	%	±%
Liberal Democrats	Michael Dickinson	632	38.6	+3.9
Labour	David Cox	616	37.6	−4.3
Conservative	Olive Clapham	287	17.5	+0.9
Swindon Org UK People Before Profit	Karsten Evans	102	6.2	+6.2
Majority		16	1.0	
Turnout		1,637	23.1	−2.3

Covingham and Nythe
Party	Candidate	Votes	%	±%
Conservative	Glenn Smith	1,323	53.4	+13.8
Labour	Peter Mallinson	766	30.9	−16.9
Liberal Democrats	Ellen Aylett	388	15.7	+3.1
Majority		557	22.5	
Turnout		2,477	35.8	+0.1

Dorcan
Party	Candidate	Votes	%	±%
Conservative	Andrew Albinson	992	44.0	+2.4
Labour	Peter Brown	951	42.2	−2.3
Liberal Democrats	John Phipps	311	13.8	+2.2
Majority		41	1.8	
Turnout		2,254	32.5	−1.7

Eastcott
Party	Candidate	Votes	%	±%
Liberal Democrats	Martin Wiltshire	1,039	53.7	+5.9
Labour	Richard Young	502	26.0	−0.5
Conservative	Valerie Butt	393	20.3	+4.0
Majority		537	27.8	+6.5
Turnout		1,934	25.5	−2.6

Freshbrook and Grange Park
Party	Candidate	Votes	%	±%
Liberal Democrats	Geraldine Robertson	987	46.9	+6.0
Conservative	Gerald Boydell	727	34.5	−0.2
Labour	James Grant	391	18.6	−5.9
Majority		260	12.4	+6.2
Turnout		2,105	27.3	−0.8

Gorse Hill and Pinehurst
Party	Candidate	Votes	%	±%
Labour	John Ballman	603	40.4	−13.9
Liberal Democrats	Steven Camburn	352	23.6	+12.8
Conservative	Mark Furkins	348	23.3	−0.8
Socialist Alliance	Andrew Newman	189	12.7	+1.8
Majority		251	16.8	−13.4
Turnout		1,492	21.6	−1.1

Haydon Wick
Party	Candidate	Votes	%	±%
Conservative	Ian Dobie	1,203	52.5	+4.6
Labour	John Keepin	625	27.3	−7.4
Liberal Democrats	Tel Hudson	462	20.2	+2.8
Majority		578	25.2	+12.0
Turnout		2,290	28.8	−1.2

Highworth
Party	Candidate	Votes	%	±%
Conservative	Melanie Duff	1,176	47.2	−3.3
Labour	Lynn Vardy	866	34.7	+6.6
Liberal Democrats	Jennifer Shorten	452	18.1	−3.4
Majority		310	12.4	−10.0
Turnout		2,494	38.3	−0.4

Moredon
Party	Candidate	Votes	%	±%
Labour	Maureen Caton	787	40.5	−5.9
Conservative	Dale Heenan	759	39.0	+3.5
Liberal Democrats	Andrew Sharp	301	15.5	−2.6
UKIP	Trevor Prescott	98	5.0	+5.0
Majority		28	1.4	−9.4
Turnout		1,945	26.0	+1.3

Old Town and Lawn
Party	Candidate	Votes	%	±%
Conservative	Fionuala Foley	2,000	54.8	+14.3
Liberal Democrats	Mark Wheaver	1,160	31.8	−17.1
Labour	Maire Darker	259	7.1	+0.2
Green	John Hughes	232	6.4	+2.7
Majority		840	23.0	
Turnout		3,651	47.6	−5.1

Parks
Party	Candidate	Votes	%	±%
Labour	Fay Howard	775	53.7	−10.7
Conservative	Natasha Young	350	24.3	+4.9
Liberal Democrats	Jacob Pajak	317	22.0	+5.8
Majority		425	29.5	−15.5
Turnout		1,442	20.8	−1.0

Penhill
Party	Candidate	Votes	%	±%
Labour	Andy Harrison	613	50.6	−8.9
Liberal Democrats	Louisa Sharp	326	26.9	+5.0
Conservative	Donald Day	172	14.2	−4.4
Socialist Alliance	Roy North	100	8.3	+8.3
Majority		287	23.7	−13.9
Turnout		1,211	26.5	+0.8

Shaw and Nine Elms
Party	Candidate	Votes	%	±%
Conservative	Garry Perkins	912	49.2	−4.0
Liberal Democrats	Amber Johnson	481	25.9	+5.8
Labour	Neil Heavens	461	24.9	−1.8
Majority		431	23.2	−3.3
Turnout		1,854	26.8	−0.4

St Margaret
Party	Candidate	Votes	%	±%
Conservative	Christopher Van Roon	1,273	54.4	+7.2
Labour	Patricia Spry	678	29.0	−10.6
Liberal Democrats	David Payne	390	16.7	+3.5
Majority		595	25.4	+17.8
Turnout		2,341	31.0	+0.5

St Philip
Party	Candidate	Votes	%	±%
Conservative	Deborah Baylies	1,107	45.6	+5.8
Labour	Eriqua Ballman	926	38.2	−7.2
Liberal Democrats	Martin Wiltshire	393	16.2	+6.5
Majority		181	7.5	
Turnout		2,426	34.0	+2.8

Toothill and Westlea
Party	Candidate	Votes	%	±%
Conservative	Steve Wakefield	879	50.4	
Labour	Philip Rashid	503	28.9	
Liberal Democrats	Leigh Bint	361	20.7	
Majority		376	21.6	
Turnout		1,743	29.4	

Walcot
Party	Candidate	Votes	%	±%
Conservative	Laura Holiday	654	40.9	
Labour	Christian Eley	566	35.4	
Liberal Democrats	Kathleen McCarthy	378	23.7	
Majority		88	5.5	
Turnout		1,598	31.1	

Western
Party	Candidate	Votes	%	±%
Labour	Keith Small	863	43.3	−6.9
Conservative	Halina Roberts	519	26.0	+0.8
Liberal Democrats	Russell Scott-Browne	444	22.3	+8.1
UKIP	Michael Morton	167	8.4	+2.4
Majority		344	17.3	−7.8
Turnout		1,993	26.3	−2.2

Wroughton and Chiseldon
Party	Candidate	Votes	%	±%
Conservative	William Morton	1,258	46.2	+2.4
Liberal Democrats	Victor Goodman	930	34.2	−3.7
Labour	Sarah Bush	534	19.6	+4.9
Majority		328	12.0	+6.0
Turnout		2,722	36.1	−3.9
