= 2003 Walsall Metropolitan Borough Council election =

2003 UK local government election

The 2003 Walsall Metropolitan Borough Council election took place on 1 May 2003 to elect members of Walsall Metropolitan Borough Council in the West Midlands, England. One third of the council was up for election and the council stayed under no overall control.

After the election, the composition of the council was

- Labour 26
- Conservative 25
- Liberal Democrat 7
- Vacant 2

== Election result ==
Overall turnout at the election was 26.7%.

Walsall local election result 2003
Party	Seats	Gains	Losses	Net gain/loss	Seats %	Votes %	Votes	+/−
Conservative	8			+1	44.4	42.0	18,182	+0.8%
Labour	8			-1	44.4	35.2	15,224	-4.7%
Liberal Democrats	2			0	11.1	10.9	4,732	+1.5%
Independent	0			0	0	4.9	2,137	-0.2%
Socialist Alliance	0			0	0	4.6	1,970	+2.6%
UKIP	0			0	0	2.4	1,050	+0.9%

== Ward results ==
Aldridge Central and South
Party	Candidate	Votes	%	±%
Conservative	Thomas Ansell	1,869	59.3	+1.3
Liberal Democrats	Royston Sheward	827	26.2	+12.6
Labour	Steven King	457	14.5	−4.1
Majority		1,042	33.0	−6.4
Turnout		3,153	32.7	−2.9

Aldridge North and Walsall Wood
Party	Candidate	Votes	%	±%
Conservative	Graham Eardley	1,734	69.9	+6.2
Labour	Peter Upton	747	30.1	−6.2
Majority		987	39.8	+12.4
Turnout		2,481	25.1	−2.7

Bentley and Darlaston North
Party	Candidate	Votes	%	±%
Labour	Keith Chambers	1,157	60.1	−3.4
Conservative	Jennifer Beale	767	39.9	+3.4
Majority		390	20.3	−6.8
Turnout		1,924	20.6	−2.7

Birchills-Leamore
Party	Candidate	Votes	%	±%
Labour	Carol Rose	916	53.2	−8.6
Conservative	Mohammed Arshad	566	32.9	−0.4
Socialist Alliance	Martin Lynch	240	13.9	+9.0
Majority		350	20.3	−8.2
Turnout		1,722	18.8	−5.2

Blakenall
Party	Candidate	Votes	%	±%
Labour	Ian Robertson	745	56.4	−2.9
Socialist Alliance	Peter Smith	308	23.3	+14.4
Conservative	Chad Pitt	268	20.3	+0.4
Majority		437	33.1	−6.3
Turnout		1,321	18.0	−1.8

Bloxwich West
Party	Candidate	Votes	%	±%
Labour	Frederick Westley	1,125	47.5	+1.1
Conservative	Desmond Pitt	952	40.2	+1.4
Socialist Alliance	Alan Davies	290	12.3	+12.3
Majority		173	7.3	−0.3
Turnout		2,367	22.0	−5.7

Brownhills
Party	Candidate	Votes	%	±%
Conservative	David Turner	1,114	56.2	+9.5
Labour	Violet Upton	869	43.8	−9.5
Majority		245	12.4	
Turnout		1,983	21.7	−3.2

Darlaston South
Party	Candidate	Votes	%	±%
Labour	Dorreen Farrell-Evans	972	61.8	−8.4
Conservative	Haqnawaz Khan	308	19.6	−10.2
Socialist Alliance	Alan Johnston	292	18.6	+18.6
Majority		664	42.2	+1.8
Turnout		1,572	19.1	−2.5

Paddock
Party	Candidate	Votes	%	±%
Conservative	Zahid Ali	1,264	33.2	−10.8
Independent	Edward Moorman	831	21.8	+0.6
Liberal Democrats	Daniel Barker	777	20.4	+9.4
Labour	Martin Evans	535	14.1	−6.6
UKIP	Derek Bennett	359	9.4	+9.4
Socialist Alliance	David Church	38	1.0	+1.0
Majority		433	11.4	−11.5
Turnout		3,804	36.0	−3.4

Palfrey
Party	Candidate	Votes	%	±%
Conservative	Mohammad Yasin	1,510	47.8	+15.0
Labour	Mark Pulford	1,020	32.3	−13.3
Independent	Richard Cullum	348	11.0	+11.0
Socialist Alliance	Azra Jabbar	279	8.8	−12.7
Majority		490	15.5	
Turnout		3,157	33.5	−3.7

Pelsall
Party	Candidate	Votes	%	±%
Conservative	Marco Longhi	1,927	54.2	−5.9
Liberal Democrats	Linda Dickens	898	25.3	+5.5
Labour	Wendy Collins	624	17.6	+0.0
Socialist Alliance	Derek Roddy	105	3.0	+3.0
Majority		1,029	29.0	−11.3
Turnout		3,554	31.6	−5.2

Pheasey
Party	Candidate	Votes	%	±%
Conservative	Christopher Towe	1,156	50.8	+15.2
Labour	Maria-Rosaria Burley	1,118	49.2	+9.4
Majority		38	1.7	
Turnout		2,274	33.0	−3.0

Pleck
Party	Candidate	Votes	%	±%
Labour	Dennis Anson	1,070	58.7	−2.7
Conservative	Doris Silvester	531	29.1	+3.4
Socialist Alliance	Brian Powell	222	12.2	+12.2
Majority		539	29.6	−6.1
Turnout		1,823	27.4	−2.2

Short Heath
Party	Candidate	Votes	%	±%
Liberal Democrats	Doreeen Shires	891	40.9	−12.5
Independent	Frederick Harris	466	21.4	+21.4
Labour	Gareth Walker	452	20.7	−8.2
Conservative	Rachel Walker	372	17.1	−0.6
Majority		425	19.5	−5.1
Turnout		2,181	25.9	+1.9

St. Matthews
Party	Candidate	Votes	%	±%
Labour	Mohammad Nazir	1,337	50.8	+1.7
Conservative	Susan Allen	831	31.5	−3.4
Liberal Democrats	Louise Shires	356	13.5	+6.7
Socialist Alliance	Stephanie Peart	110	4.2	+2.3
Majority		506	19.2	+5.0
Turnout		2,634	37.0	+0.0

Streetly
Party	Candidate	Votes	%	±%
Conservative	Brian Douglas-Maul	2,135	62.5	−2.6
UKIP	Steven Grey	691	20.2	+7.3
Labour	Thomas Charlton	590	17.3	−4.7
Majority		1,444	42.3	−0.8
Turnout		3,416	32.0	−0.9

Willenhall North
Party	Candidate	Votes	%	±%
Liberal Democrats	Valerie Woodruff	983	51.3	−5.5
Labour	Robert Matthews	468	24.4	−2.9
Conservative	Lisa Hodgetts	380	19.8	+3.9
Socialist Alliance	Alan Paddock	86	4.5	+4.5
Majority		515	26.9	−2.6
Turnout		1,917	20.7	−2.1

Willenhall South
Party	Candidate	Votes	%	±%
Labour	Sean Coughlan	1,022	50.8	−4.0
Conservative	Steven Turner	498	24.8	−2.0
Independent	Gerald Watkins	492	24.5	+24.5
Majority		524	26.0	−2.0
Turnout		2,012	21.5	−1.5
