= 2003 Southampton City Council election =

2003 UK local government election

Map of the results of the 2003 Southampton council election. Liberal Democrats in yellow, Conservatives in blue and Labour in red.

The 2003 Southampton Council election took place on 1 May 2003 to elect members of Southampton Unitary Council in Hampshire, England. One third of the council was up for election and the council stayed under no overall control.

After the election, the composition of the council was:

- Liberal Democrat 18
- Labour 16
- Conservative 12
- Liberal 1
- Independent 1

== Election result ==
The results saw the Liberal Democrats become the largest party on the council with 18 seats, but without a majority, after making 3 gains. They gained the seats of Coxford and Millbrook from Liberal Party councillors who had previously left the Liberal Democrats, and the seat of Woolston from Labour. This was the first time the Liberal Democrats, or their predecessors the Liberal Party, had been the largest party in Southampton for over 90 years.

Labour were reduced to 16 seats after losing another seat in Sholing to the Conservatives who went up to 12 seats. The Liberal Party defeats reduced them to only 1 seat, while 1 independent who was not up for re-election remained. Overall turnout was up by only 0.8% from 2002 at 29%, despite all voters having the option to vote by post.

Following the election, discussions were held in order to decide who would be to take control of the council, with Labour trying to remain in control and the Liberal Democrats looking to take over. The Conservatives refused to support either of the other groups, meaning that the Liberal and independent councillors held the balance, as Labour's Parvin Damani had a potential casting vote as mayor. However the full council meeting on 21 May saw Liberal Democrat Adrian Vinson become council leader by 1 vote, after gaining the support of independent and formerly Labour councillor Paul Russell, after Vinson had earlier offered Russell a cabinet post.

Southampton local election result 2003
Party	Seats	Gains	Losses	Net gain/loss	Seats %	Votes %	Votes	+/−
Liberal Democrats	6	3	0	▲3	37.5	30.7	14,710	▼0.8
Conservative	6	1	0	▲1	37.5	30.0	14,403	▲1.6
Labour	4	0	2	▼2	25.0	30.1	14,442	▼5.4
BNP	0	0	0	Steady	0.0	2.5	1,179	▲2.5
Liberal	0	0	2	▼2	0.0	2.1	1,023	▲2.1
UKIP	0	0	0	Steady	0.0	1.9	893	▲1.6
Green	0	0	0	Steady	0.0	1.4	652	▲0.1
Socialist Alliance	0	0	0	Steady	0.0	1.0	477	▲0.5
Independent	0	0	0	Steady	0.0	0.4	201	▼1.8

== Ward results ==
=== Bargate ===
Bargate
Party	Candidate	Votes	%	±%
Labour	Parvin Damani	779	46.1	
Conservative	Tina Lanning	494	29.2	
Liberal Democrats	Maureen Kirkwood	416	24.6	
Majority		285	16.9	
Turnout		1,689	15.5	−1.0
Labour hold		Swing		

=== Bassett ===
Bassett
Party	Candidate	Votes	%	±%
Conservative	Alec Samuels	1,673	46.2	
Liberal Democrats	Judith Webb	1,221	33.7	
Labour	Michael Lewkowicz	480	13.2	
Liberal	Violet Riddle	139	3.8	
UKIP	Michael Cottrell	111	3.1	
Majority		452	12.5	
Turnout		3,624	34.0	+2.3
Conservative hold		Swing		

=== Bevois ===
Bevois
Party	Candidate	Votes	%	±%
Labour	Jacqui Rayment	1,021	47.0	
Liberal Democrats	Christine Hordley	464	21.3	
Conservative	Pamela Rees	399	18.4	
Green	David Cromwell	191	8.8	
Socialist Alliance	Ella Noyes	99	4.6	
Majority		557	25.7	
Turnout		2,174	21.5	−4.0
Labour hold		Swing		

=== Bitterne ===
Bitterne
Party	Candidate	Votes	%	±%
Labour	Matthew Stevens	1,268	44.2	
Conservative	Ivan White	740	25.8	
Liberal Democrats	Robert Naish	487	17.0	
BNP	Jason Brown	288	10.0	
UKIP	Conrad Brown	84	2.9	
Majority		528	18.4	
Turnout		2,867	28.7	−1.2
Labour hold		Swing		

=== Bitterne Park ===
Bitterne Park
Party	Candidate	Votes	%	±%
Conservative	Peter Baillie	1,457	42.0	
Liberal Democrats	Frederick Tucker	1,287	37.1	
Labour	Joseph Hannigan	603	17.4	
Liberal	Kenneth Bellwood	118	3.4	
Majority		170	4.9	
Turnout		3,465	34.2	+1.6
Conservative hold		Swing		

=== Coxford ===
Coxford
Party	Candidate	Votes	%	±%
Liberal Democrats	Kenneth Darke	1,187	39.3	
Labour	Sarah Bogle	933	30.9	
Conservative	Lesley Matthews	361	12.0	
Liberal	Michael Gausden	245	8.1	
BNP	Edwin Gamon	197	6.5	
UKIP	Leslie Obee	95	3.1	
Majority		254	8.4	
Turnout		3,018	28.8	+2.3
Liberal Democrats gain from Liberal		Swing		

=== Freemantle ===
Freemantle
Party	Candidate	Votes	%	±%
Conservative	Brian Parnell	1,308	43.9	
Labour	Norman Rides	861	28.9	
Liberal Democrats	Barbara Cummins	487	16.3	
Green	Darren Pickering	256	8.6	
Socialist Alliance	Mark Abel	70	2.3	
Majority		447	15.0	
Turnout		2,982	28.9	+1.0
Conservative hold		Swing		

=== Harefield ===
Harefield
Party	Candidate	Votes	%	±%
Conservative	Adrian Johnson	1,792	50.6	
Labour	Kenneth Tew	1,143	32.3	
Liberal Democrats	Simon Hordley	606	17.1	
Majority		649	18.3	
Turnout		3,541	33.7	+0.7
Conservative hold		Swing		

=== Millbrook ===
Millbrook
Party	Candidate	Votes	%	±%
Liberal Democrats	Christopher Proctor	1,338	41.2	
Labour	Nigel Clark	763	23.5	
Conservative	Michael Ball	502	15.5	
Liberal	George Melrose	367	11.3	
BNP	Terrie Rintoul	230	7.1	
Socialist Alliance	Derek Twine	49	1.5	
Majority		575	17.7	
Turnout		3,249	30.3	+1.6
Liberal Democrats gain from Liberal		Swing		

=== Peartree ===
Peartree
Party	Candidate	Votes	%	±%
Liberal Democrats	John Slade	1,519	49.1	
Labour	Roger Iles	814	26.3	
Conservative	Michael Denness	616	19.9	
UKIP	Martin Daish	146	4.7	
Majority		705	22.8	
Turnout		3,095	30.4	+2.1
Liberal Democrats hold		Swing		

=== Portswood ===
Portswood
Party	Candidate	Votes	%	±%
Liberal Democrats	Calvin Horner	1,528	47.5	
Conservative	Edward Daunt	700	21.8	
Labour	Ann Wardle	562	17.5	
Green	Joseph Cox	205	6.4	
Socialist Alliance	Jeanne Butterfield	136	4.2	
Liberal	Susan Pike	86	2.7	
Majority		828	25.7	
Turnout		3,217	30.3	−2.0
Liberal Democrats hold		Swing		

=== Redbridge ===
Redbridge
Party	Candidate	Votes	%	±%
Labour	Peter Marsh-Jenks	1,235	43.3	
Conservative	Enid Greenham	699	24.5	
Liberal Democrats	Edward Blake	598	21.0	
BNP	Jason Robinson	275	9.6	
Socialist Alliance	Paul Nicholson	46	1.6	
Majority		536	18.8	
Turnout		2,853	27.0	+2.0
Labour hold		Swing		

=== Shirley ===
Shirley
Party	Candidate	Votes	%	±%
Conservative	Richard Forbes	1,579	44.2	
Labour	Warwick Payne	1,028	28.8	
Liberal Democrats	David Newman	657	18.4	
Independent	Simon Hardy	201	5.6	
UKIP	Kevin Costigane	106	3.0	
Majority		551	15.4	
Turnout		3,571	35.1	−0.5
Conservative hold		Swing		

=== Sholing ===
Sholing
Party	Candidate	Votes	%	±%
Conservative	Gavin Dick	1,269	37.6	
Labour	Paul Jenks	1,225	36.3	
Liberal Democrats	Colin McPhee	588	17.4	
UKIP	Tony Weaver	256	7.6	
Socialist Alliance	Leonora Goergen	39	1.2	
Majority		44	1.3	
Turnout		3,377	32.2	+0.4
Conservative gain from Labour		Swing		

=== Swaythling ===
Swaythling
Party	Candidate	Votes	%	±%
Liberal Democrats	Terence Holden-Brown	1,066	46.4	
Labour	Michael Brainsby	636	27.7	
Conservative	Robert Alexander	432	18.8	
UKIP	Rodney Caws	95	4.1	
Liberal	June Mitchell	68	3.0	
Majority		430	18.7	
Turnout		2,297	23.8	+0.5
Liberal Democrats hold		Swing		

=== Woolston ===
Woolston
Party	Candidate	Votes	%	±%
Liberal Democrats	David Simpson	1,261	42.6	
Labour	Julian Price	1,091	36.8	
Conservative	Brian Lankford	382	12.9	
BNP	Debbyann Payne	189	6.4	
Socialist Alliance	Matthew Wilkinson	38	1.3	
Majority		170	5.8	
Turnout		2,961	29.8	−0.1
Liberal Democrats gain from Labour		Swing		

Preceded by 2002 Southampton Council election	Southampton local elections	Succeeded by 2004 Southampton Council election
