= 2002 Southampton City Council election =

2002 UK local government election

Map of the results of the 2002 Southampton council election. Labour in red, Liberal Democrats in yellow and Conservatives in blue.

The 2002 Southampton Council election took place on 2 May 2002 to elect members of Southampton Unitary Council in Hampshire, England. The whole council was up for election with boundary changes since the last election in 2000 increasing the number of seat by 3. The council stayed under no overall control.

== Election result ==
The results saw no party win a majority on the council, with Labour just remaining the largest party. The Conservatives gained 4 seats, but the Conservative group leader, Conor Burns, lost his seat. Burns came fourth in Bassett ward behind his two party colleagues and Liberal Democrat Elizabeth Mizon.

Southampton local election result 2002
Party	Seats	Gains	Losses	Net gain/loss	Seats %	Votes %	Votes	+/−
Labour	19			▼3	39.6	35.5	46,669	▼3.9
Liberal Democrats	18			▲2	37.5	31.5	41,346	▲0.7
Conservative	11			▲4	22.9	28.4	37,359	▼3.5
Independent	0			Steady	0	2.2	2,875	▼0.8
Green	0			Steady	0	1.3	1,744	▼1.1
Socialist Alliance	0			Steady	0	0.5	687	▲0.5
UKIP	0			Steady	0	0.3	401	▲0.1
Socialist Labour	0			Steady	0	0.1	148	▲0.1
Socialist Alternative	0			Steady	0	0.1	109	▲0.1

== Ward results ==
=== Bargate ===
Bargate (3)
Party	Candidate	Votes	%
Labour	Richard Harris	819	
Labour	John Noon	811	
Labour	Parvin Damani	787	
Conservative	Clifford Combes	501	
Conservative	Elsie Warbrick	458	
Conservative	Tina Lanning	448	
Liberal Democrats	Roger Blades	258	
Liberal Democrats	Valerie Grant	258	
Liberal Democrats	Beaulis Hills	213	
UKIP	Lorraine Barter	104	
Socialist Labour	Daniel Angus	91	
UKIP	Hugo Lamb-Hickman	61	
Socialist Labour	Michael Holmes	57	
Turnout		4,866	16.5

=== Bassett ===
Bassett (3)
Party	Candidate	Votes	%
Liberal Democrats	Elizabeth Mizon	1,481	
Conservative	John Hannides	1,470	
Conservative	Alec Samuels	1,386	
Conservative	Conor Burns	1,352	
Liberal Democrats	Roger Byatt	1,294	
Liberal Democrats	Brian Chapman	1,282	
Labour	Michael Brainsby	551	
Labour	Caran Clay	469	
Labour	Jean Taylor	457	
Turnout		9,742	31.7

=== Bevois ===
Bevois (3)
Party	Candidate	Votes	%
Labour	Derek Burke	902	
Labour	Stephen Barnes-Andrews	855	
Labour	Jacqueline Rayment	775	
Independent	Bashir Ahmed	768	
Independent	Harjap Singh	736	
Independent	Anthony Broomes	640	
Conservative	Jean Baker	353	
Conservative	Edward Glossop	326	
Conservative	Susan Proctor	312	
Liberal Democrats	Susan Pike	298	
Liberal Democrats	Michael Beckett	286	
Liberal Democrats	Maureen Kirkwood	261	
Green	David Cromwell	244	
Socialist Alternative	Gavin Marsh	109	
Socialist Alliance	Ella Noyes	109	
Turnout		6,974	25.5

=== Bitterne ===
Bitterne (3)
Party	Candidate	Votes	%
Labour	Penelope Baldwin	1,432	
Labour	Christine Kelly	1,420	
Labour	Perry McMillan	1,366	
Conservative	John Hartwell	709	
Conservative	Arthur Weaver	616	
Conservative	Peter Nightingale	563	
Liberal Democrats	Diana Wills	349	
Liberal Democrats	Gregory Key	347	
Liberal Democrats	Robert Naish	341	
Turnout		7,143	29.9

=== Bitterne Park ===
Bitterne Park (3)
Party	Candidate	Votes	%
Liberal Democrats	Nigel Impey	1,257	
Liberal Democrats	Anne Work	1,254	
Conservative	Peter Baillie	1,245	
Conservative	Eric Mintram	1,212	
Liberal Democrats	Mark Cooper	1,174	
Conservative	Matthew Dean	1,121	
Labour	Sarah Bogle	685	
Labour	Jonathan Walters	645	
Labour	David Furnell	637	
Turnout		9,230	32.6

=== Coxford ===
Coxford (3)
Party	Candidate	Votes	%
Liberal Democrats	Peter Galton	1,328	
Liberal Democrats	Harry Mitchell	1,272	
Liberal Democrats	Michael Gausden	1,185	
Labour	Susanne Fletcher	1,000	
Labour	Donald Thomas	968	
Labour	Stephen Fricker	927	
Conservative	Phyllis Boniface	398	
Conservative	Jacqueline Mason	377	
Conservative	Pamela Rees	352	
Turnout		7,807	26.5

=== Freemantle ===
Freemantle (3)
Party	Candidate	Votes	%
Conservative	Jeremy Moulton	1,087	
Labour	Simon Letts	1,062	
Conservative	Brian Parnell	1,060	
Labour	Nigel Clark	1,044	
Conservative	Michael Ball	1,039	
Labour	Funda Pepperell	993	
Liberal Democrats	Barbara Cummins	494	
Liberal Democrats	James Rogerson	401	
Green	Owain Clarke	348	
Liberal Democrats	Philip Melrose	344	
Green	Darren Pickering	314	
Socialist Alliance	Mark Abel	140	
UKIP	Ronald Smith	74	
Turnout		8,400	27.9

=== Harefield ===
Harefield (3)
Party	Candidate	Votes	%
Conservative	Royston Smith	1,538	
Conservative	Richard Halderthay	1,512	
Conservative	Adrian Johnson	1,501	
Labour	Warwick Payne	1,287	
Labour	Kenneth Tew	1,252	
Labour	Norman Rides	1,206	
Liberal Democrats	Joyce Smerdon	438	
Liberal Democrats	Sylvia Drake	431	
Liberal Democrats	Simon Hordley	422	
Green	Andrew Shaw	204	
Turnout		9,791	33.0

=== Millbrook ===
Millbrook (3)
Party	Candidate	Votes	%
Liberal Democrats	Peter Wakeford	1,651	
Liberal Democrats	Virginia Moore	1,587	
Liberal Democrats	George Melrose	1,548	
Labour	Ceren Davis	795	
Labour	Eileen Sharp	759	
Labour	Richard Fricker	710	
Conservative	William Reynard	394	
Conservative	Terry Withington	393	
Conservative	Julian Isaacson	390	
Green	Joseph Cox	237	
Turnout		8,464	28.7

=== Peartree ===
Peartree (3)
Party	Candidate	Votes	%
Liberal Democrats	Gerry Drake	1,462	
Liberal Democrats	Norah Goss	1,404	
Liberal Democrats	John Slade	1,315	
Labour	Carolyn Burfitt	764	
Labour	Peter Davis	732	
Labour	Roger Iles	725	
Conservative	Marie Chamberlain	430	
Conservative	Keith Worthy	394	
Conservative	Brian Lankford	386	
Turnout		7,612	28.3

=== Portswood ===
Portswood (3)
Party	Candidate	Votes	%
Liberal Democrats	Jill Baston	1,830	
Liberal Democrats	Adrian Vinson	1,675	
Liberal Democrats	Calvin Horner	1,623	
Conservative	Liam Ascough	827	
Conservative	Nicholas Howells	803	
Conservative	Edward Daunt	798	
Labour	Joseph Hannigan	667	
Labour	Joan Rogers	654	
Labour	Jacob Rahman	591	
Socialist Alliance	Philip Pope	154	
Socialist Alliance	Anthony Twine	140	
Turnout		9,762	32.3

=== Redbridge ===
Redbridge (3)
Party	Candidate	Votes	%
Labour	Paul Russell	1,444	
Labour	Dennis Harryman	1,357	
Labour	Peter Marsh-Jenks	1,283	
Liberal Democrats	Jill Rudge	831	
Conservative	Enid Greenham	567	
Conservative	Lesley Matthews	531	
Conservative	Christina Philbrick	512	
Liberal Democrats	Edward Blake	466	
Liberal Democrats	June Mitchell	414	
Socialist Alliance	Paul Nicholson	78	
Socialist Alliance	Mathew Danaher	66	
Turnout		7,549	25.0

=== Shirley ===
Shirley (3)
Party	Candidate	Votes	%
Conservative	Edwina Cooke	1,462	
Conservative	Terence Matthews	1,388	
Conservative	Paulette Holt	1,382	
Labour	Anthony Rees	1,177	
Labour	William Kearns	1,126	
Labour	Stuart Webb	997	
Independent	Simon Hardy	731	
Liberal Democrats	Paul Kobryn	457	
Liberal Democrats	Violet Riddle	404	
Green	John Spottiswoode	397	
Liberal Democrats	Stephen Trent	384	
UKIP	Valerie Aston	162	
Turnout		10,067	35.6

=== Sholing ===
Sholing (3)
Party	Candidate	Votes	%
Labour	Susan Blatchford	1,525	
Labour	June Bridle	1,508	
Labour	Paul Jenks	1,291	
Conservative	Lesley Hilliam	1,227	
Conservative	Philip Lankford	1,174	
Conservative	Philip Williams	1,105	
Liberal Democrats	Rita Gatesman	468	
Liberal Democrats	Kenneth Hawkins	454	
Liberal Democrats	John Hills	437	
Turnout		9,189	31.8

=== Swaythling ===
Swaythling (3)
Party	Candidate	Votes	%
Liberal Democrats	David Beckett	1,154	
Liberal Democrats	Ann Milton	1,048	
Liberal Democrats	Terence Holden-Brown	1,006	
Labour	Christine Medway-Bull	678	
Labour	Michael Collins	663	
Labour	Ann Wardle	646	
Conservative	Emma Webster	404	
Conservative	Richard Forbes	402	
Conservative	Benjamin Guy	387	
Turnout		6,388	23.3

=== Woolston ===
Woolston (3)
Party	Candidate	Votes	%
Labour	Carol Cunio	1,443	
Labour	Richard Williams	1,412	
Labour	Julian Price	1,372	
Liberal Democrats	David Simpson	1,077	
Liberal Democrats	David Newman	1,025	
Liberal Democrats	Colin McPhee	958	
Conservative	Roy Chamberlain	365	
Conservative	John Martin	363	
Conservative	Doris Moore	339	
Turnout		8,364	29.9

Preceded by 2000 Southampton Council election	Southampton local elections	Succeeded by 2003 Southampton Council election
