= 2006 Swindon Borough Council election =

2006 UK local government election

Map of the results of the 2006 Swindon council election. Conservatives in blue, Labour in red and Liberal Democrat in orange. Wards in grey were not contested in 2006.

The 2006 Swindon Borough Council election took place on 4 May 2006 to elect members of Swindon Unitary Council in Wiltshire, England. One third of the council was up for election and the Conservative Party stayed in overall control of the council.

After the election, the composition of the council was:

- Conservative 40
- Labour 14
- Liberal Democrat 3
- Independent 2

== Campaign ==
19 seats were contested in the election, with a total of 70 candidates standing and 10 sitting councillors not defending their seats. From the parties defending seats in the election these included 19 each from the Conservative and Labour parties and 15 Liberal Democrats. Other candidates included 11 from the Green Party, 2 Socialist Unity and 3 independents. The election also saw the British National Party (BNP) stand for Swindon council for the first time, with one candidate, Reg Bates, standing in Gorse Hill and Pinehurst ward. His candidature led a group comprising trade unions, the Labour Party, community groups and some independent socialists to form an alliance in opposition to the BNP.

Issues in the election included regeneration, with the different parties proposing different ideas including a library, art gallery, redeveloped car park and the preservation of green spaces. The Conservatives defended their record in control of the council, saying that they had improved services and increased council tax by lower percentages than Labour had when they had been in control of the council. Labour said they would protect services the Conservatives were cutting, deal with anti-social behaviour and criticised the Conservatives for increasing council tax. Meanwhile, the Liberal Democrats said they would stand up for local residents and make the town centre attractive for everyone.

For the election a new website was launched by the council where voters could register in order to get reminders to vote, in an effort to increase turnout.

== Election result ==
The results saw the Conservatives strengthen their control of the council after gaining 5 seats to hold 40 of the 59 seats. 3 of the gains came from Labour who were reduced to 14 seats, with both of Labour's Swindon Members of Parliament blaming the defeats on national issues. The other two Conservative gains were from the Liberal Democrats who fell to 3 seats, while the 2 independent councillors were not defending seats in 2006. Overall turnout in the election was 34.21%, up on the 32.7% in the 2004 election.

Swindon local election result 2006
Party	Seats	Gains	Losses	Net gain/loss	Seats %	Votes %	Votes	+/−
Conservative	13	5	0	+5	68.4	47.6	20,819	+2.5
Labour	5	0	3	−3	26.3	30.2	13,203	+2.4
Liberal Democrats	1	0	2	−2	5.3	14.1	6,156	−6.2
Green	0	0	0	0	0.0	5.8	2,534	+0.9
Independent	0	0	0	0	0.0	1.0	458	+0.6
BNP	0	0	0	0	0.0	0.7	319	+0.7
Socialist Unity	0	0	0	0	0.0	0.6	244	+0.6

== Ward results ==
Abbey Meads
Party	Candidate	Votes	%	±%
Conservative	J Tomlinson	1,329	70.4	+12.2
Labour	G Lawson	261	13.8	−7.3
Liberal Democrats	L Sharp	158	8.4	−12.3
Green	E Bushell	139	7.4	+7.4
Majority		1,068	56.6	+19.5
Turnout		1,887		
Conservative hold		Swing		

Blunsdon
Party	Candidate	Votes	%	±%
Conservative	G Dart	875	83.7	+11.5
Labour	J Sefton	171	16.3	+1.8
Majority		704	67.3	+9.6
Turnout		1,046		
Conservative hold		Swing		

Central
Party	Candidate	Votes	%	±%
Labour	R Wright	1,005	46.5	+3.9
Conservative	K Leakey	642	29.7	+4.1
Liberal Democrats	H Thompson	317	14.7	−4.7
Green	K Evans	139	6.4	−2.2
Independent	D Rowland	56	2.6	+2.6
Majority		363	16.8	−0.2
Turnout		2,159		
Labour hold		Swing		

Covingham and Nythe
Party	Candidate	Votes	%	±%
Conservative	P Young	1,526	57.5	+5.4
Labour	M Dilley	1,126	42.5	+9.8
Majority		400	15.1	−4.3
Turnout		2,652		
Conservative gain from Labour		Swing		

Dorcan
Party	Candidate	Votes	%	±%
Conservative	A James	1,266	49.1	−1.5
Labour	N Butler	785	30.4	−2.1
Liberal Democrats	E Aylett	311	12.0	−4.9
Green	S Smith	219	8.5	+8.5
Majority		481	18.6	+0.5
Turnout		2,581		
Conservative hold		Swing		

Eastcott
Party	Candidate	Votes	%	±%
Liberal Democrats	D Wood	1,201	48.9	+2.7
Labour	M Ofori	508	20.7	−0.2
Conservative	P Gregory	483	19.7	−1.6
Green	J Hughes	263	10.7	−0.9
Majority		693	28.2	+3.4
Turnout		2,455		
Liberal Democrats hold		Swing		

Freshbrook and Grange Park
Party	Candidate	Votes	%	±%
Conservative	M Bray	1,127	45.2	+2.5
Liberal Democrats	H Teague	835	33.5	−6.2
Labour	N Heavens	364	14.6	−3.0
Green	M Harrison	166	6.7	+6.7
Majority		292	11.7	+8.7
Turnout		2,492		
Conservative gain from Liberal Democrats		Swing		

Gorse Hill and Pinehurst
Party	Candidate	Votes	%	±%
Labour	M Fanning	825	41.3	−2.9
Conservative	R Barnett	421	21.1	−6.0
BNP	R Bates	319	16.0	+16.0
Liberal Democrats	D Pajak	169	8.5	−8.9
Independent	C Hunt	154	7.7	+7.7
Socialist Unity	R North	109	5.5	−5.9
Majority		404	20.2	+3.0
Turnout		1,997		
Labour hold		Swing		

Haydon Wick
Party	Candidate	Votes	%	±%
Conservative	D Ranard	1,368	55.8	+1.1
Labour	I Carroll	697	28.4	+3.6
Liberal Democrats	A Sharp	385	15.7	−4.8
Majority		671	27.4	−2.5
Turnout		2,450		
Conservative hold		Swing		

Highworth
Party	Candidate	Votes	%	±%
Conservative	J Short	1,423	54.8	+3.7
Labour	A Durrant	691	26.6	+0.9
Green	A Day	282	10.9	+2.8
Liberal Democrats	C Shepherd	202	7.8	−7.3
Majority		732	28.2	+2.8
Turnout		2,598		
Conservative hold		Swing		

Moredon
Party	Candidate	Votes	%	±%
Conservative	D Wren	1,047	45.0	+0.9
Labour	D Montaut	1,010	43.4	+5.0
Liberal Democrats	J Pajak	269	11.6	−1.1
Majority		37	1.6	−4.1
Turnout		2,326		
Conservative gain from Labour		Swing		

Old Town and Lawn
Party	Candidate	Votes	%	±%
Conservative	B Mattock	2,020	58.6	+2.6
Liberal Democrats	M Wheaver	586	17.0	−8.3
Labour	R Brooks	495	14.3	+5.5
Green	C Smith	349	10.1	+0.3
Majority		1,434	41.6	+10.9
Turnout		3,450		
Conservative gain from Liberal Democrats		Swing		

Parks
Party	Candidate	Votes	%	±%
Labour	B Thompson	694	42.6	−1.1
Conservative	G Cherry	580	35.6	+12.0
Green	D Miles	355	21.8	+10.7
Majority		114	7.0	−13.1
Turnout		1,629		
Labour hold		Swing		

Penhill
Party	Candidate	Votes	%	±%
Labour	D Glaholm	544	45.2	−5.4
Liberal Democrats	T Hudson	372	30.9	+4.0
Conservative	H Tomlinson	287	23.9	+9.7
Majority		172	14.3	−9.4
Turnout		1,203		
Labour hold		Swing		

Shaw and Nine Elms
Party	Candidate	Votes	%	±%
Conservative	K Williams	1,255	60.2	+5.3
Labour	J Doyle	377	18.1	+2.1
Liberal Democrats	J Farr	270	12.9	−1.0
Green	J Miles	184	8.8	+1.1
Majority		878	42.1	+3.2
Turnout		2,086		
Conservative hold		Swing		

St Margaret
Party	Candidate	Votes	%	±%
Conservative	M Edwards	1,569	63.4	+9.0
Labour	M Spry	904	36.6	+9.6
Majority		665	26.9	−0.5
Turnout		2,473		
Conservative hold		Swing		

St Philip
Party	Candidate	Votes	%	±%
Conservative	D Sammels	1,117	41.8	−2.1
Labour	T Page	1,094	41.0	+0.4
Liberal Democrats	A Richards	230	8.6	−0.3
Green	R Smith	230	8.6	+2.0
Majority		23	0.9	−2.5
Turnout		2,671		
Conservative gain from Labour		Swing		

Western
Party	Candidate	Votes	%	±%
Labour	K Small	1,226	46.3	+6.9
Conservative	J Milton	870	32.9	−0.4
Liberal Democrats	M Cousens	417	15.7	+5.3
Socialist Unity	A Newman	135	5.1	+5.1
Majority		356	13.4	+8.4
Turnout		2,648		
Labour hold		Swing		

Wroughton and Chiseldon
Party	Candidate	Votes	%	±%
Conservative	E Shaw	1,614	55.1	−0.8
Liberal Democrats	L Newman	434	14.8	−7.7
Labour	M Gladman	426	14.5	−0.5
Independent	J Newman	248	8.5	+8.5
Green	R Heritage	208	7.1	+0.5
Majority		1,180	40.3	+7.0
Turnout		2,930		
Conservative hold		Swing		
