= 2011 Swindon Borough Council election =

2011 UK local government election

Map of the results of the 2011 Swindon council election. Conservatives in blue, Labour in red and Liberal Democrats in yellow. Wards in grey were not contested in 2011.

The 2011 Swindon Borough Council election took place on 5 May 2011 to elect members of Swindon Unitary Council in Wiltshire, England. One third of the council was up for election and the Conservative Party stayed in overall control of the council.

After the election, the composition of the council was

- Conservative 38
- Labour 17
- Liberal Democrat 4

== Background ==
Before the election the Conservatives controlled the council with 40 seats, compared to 15 for Labour and 4 for the Liberal Democrats. 20 of the 59 seats were being contested, with the winners only serving for one year as the 2012 election would see every seat being contested after boundary changes. Since the 2010 election Labour had gained Moredon in a by-election and had the independent, former Conservative, councillor Steve Wakefield of Toothill and Westlea ward join the party, both in November 2010.

During the campaign both the national Labour leader Ed Miliband and the Labour Shadow Works and Pensions Secretary Liam Byrne visited Swindon to support the local party.

== Election result ==
The results saw the Conservatives stay in control of the council with 38 seats, but lose 2 seats to Labour, who moved to 17 seats. Labour gained the seats of St Philip and Walcot from the Conservatives, while coming close in Eastcott against the Liberal Democrats and in Covingham and Nythe, Dorcan and Freshbrook and Grange Park, which were held by the Conservatives. The Labour victory in Walcot defeated the Conservative cabinet member Peter Mallinson, with the winning candidate Ellen Osa becoming the first female black councillor in Swindon. Overall turnout at the election was 38.26%, ranging from a high of 46.08% in Highworth to a low of 29.62% in Parks.

The outgoing leader of the Labour group, Derique Montaut, said the results meant that "For Labour it builds us up to a situation where we are moving up to 2012 and taking control of the council". However the Conservative leader of the council, Ron Bluh, said that while "It obviously wasn't one of the better nights", the seats lost had been the "two most marginal seats" and "so there's no great surprise".

Following the election Jim Grant was elected as the new leader of the Labour group on the council, defeating Mark Dempsey and Bob Wright.

Swindon local election result 2011
Party	Seats	Gains	Losses	Net gain/loss	Seats %	Votes %	Votes	+/−
Conservative	10	0	2	-2	50.0	41.4	23,985	-1.1%
Labour	9	2	0	+2	45.0	38.8	22,486	+8.3%
Liberal Democrats	1	0	0	0	5.0	10.1	5,863	-11.7%
UKIP	0	0	0	0	0	6.0	3,464	+4.0%
Green	0	0	0	0	0	2.1	1,243	+1.0%
Independent	0	0	0	0	0	1.4	805	+1.2%
BNP	0	0	0	0	0	0.1	73	-1.8%
SDP	0	0	0	0	0	0.1	33	+0.1%

== Ward results ==
Abbey Meads
Party	Candidate	Votes	%	±%
Conservative	Peter Stoddart	2,610	60.4	+5.2
Labour	Mark Viner	1,109	25.6	+5.7
Liberal Democrats	Aneta Golebiewska	368	8.5	−13.2
UKIP	Gary Belben	237	5.5	+2.3
Majority		1,501	34.7	+1.2
Turnout		4,324	31.3	
Conservative hold		Swing	-0.3	

Central
Party	Candidate	Votes	%	±%
Labour	Derique Montaut	1,829	64.9	+12.1
Conservative	Paul Gregory	471	16.7	−9.2
Liberal Democrats	Gary Porter	213	7.6	−7.5
Green	Robert Heritage	155	5.5	+2.5
UKIP	Eleanor Pomagalski	95	3.4	+3.4
Independent	Karsten Evans	55	2.0	+0.7
Majority		1,358	48.2	+21.3
Turnout		2,818	34.3	
Labour hold		Swing	+10.6	

Covingham and Nythe
Party	Candidate	Votes	%	±%
Conservative	Emma Faramarzi	1,354	43.2	−1.3
Labour	Peter Watts	1,205	38.4	+7.5
UKIP	Corinna Allen	352	11.2	+3.0
Liberal Democrats	Christopher Ward	224	7.1	−9.4
Majority		149	4.8	−8.8
Turnout		3,135	44.3	
Conservative hold		Swing	-4.4	

Dorcan
Party	Candidate	Votes	%	±%
Conservative	Andrew Albinson	1,366	47.5	+6.1
Labour	Gerard Meheran	1,193	41.5	+10.3
Liberal Democrats	Clive Hooper	166	5.8	−8.3
Green	Simon Smith	152	5.3	+3.5
Majority		173	6.0	−4.3
Turnout		2,877	43.4	
Conservative hold		Swing	-2.1	

Eastcott
Party	Candidate	Votes	%	±%
Liberal Democrats	Nicola Sewell	1,213	39.3	−6.5
Labour	Christopher Watts	1,091	35.4	+9.5
Conservative	David Gould	501	16.2	−7.0
Green	John Hughes	185	6.0	+0.9
UKIP	Vincent Pomagalski	94	3.0	+3.0
Majority		122	4.0	−16.0
Turnout		3,084	38.2	
Liberal Democrats hold		Swing	-8.0	

Freshbrook and Grange Park
Party	Candidate	Votes	%	±%
Conservative	Michael Dickinson	1,320	45.0	−1.3
Labour	Neil Heavens	1,046	35.7	+8.4
Liberal Democrats	Heidi Teague	331	11.3	−15.2
UKIP	John Lenton	237	8.1	+8.1
Majority		274	9.3	−9.7
Turnout		2,934	39.3	
Conservative hold		Swing	-4.8	

Gorse Hill and Pinehurst
Party	Candidate	Votes	%	±%
Labour	John Ballman	1,257	59.7	+16.3
Conservative	Wendy Welch	474	22.5	−5.6
Liberal Democrats	Lynda Barber	179	8.5	−10.7
UKIP	Robin Tingey	122	5.8	+5.8
BNP	Reginald Bates	73	3.5	−5.8
Majority		783	37.2	+21.9
Turnout		2,105	30.3	
Labour hold		Swing	-10.9	

Haydon Wick
Party	Candidate	Votes	%	±%
Conservative	Claire Ellis	1,766	55.5	+5.7
Labour	Timothy Page	947	29.8	+3.6
UKIP	Edmund Gerrard	259	8.1	+3.2
Liberal Democrats	David Pajak	209	6.6	−12.6
Majority		819	25.7	+2.1
Turnout		3,181	40.6	
Conservative hold		Swing	+1.0	

Highworth
Party	Candidate	Votes	%	±%
Conservative	Alan Bishop	1,662	54.7	+7.5
Labour	Hazel Beaumont	951	31.3	+3.8
Liberal Democrats	Jennifer Shorten	249	8.2	−12.4
Green	Andrew Day	179	5.9	+1.2
Majority		711	23.4	+3.7
Turnout		3,041	46.1	
Conservative hold		Swing	+1.8	

Moredon
Party	Candidate	Votes	%	±%
Labour	Jennifer Millin	1,142	43.8	+9.0
Conservative	Toby Elliott	1,091	41.8	+2.4
UKIP	Kathleen Webb	237	9.1	+9.1
Liberal Democrats	Tracy Ockley	137	5.3	−13.3
Majority		51	2.0	
Turnout		2,607	35.2	
Labour hold		Swing	+3.3	

Old Town and Lawn
Party	Candidate	Votes	%	±%
Conservative	Fionuala Foley	2,249	53.1	+3.7
Labour	Cindy Matthews	1,040	24.5	+5.6
Liberal Democrats	Joan Mortimer	446	10.5	−13.2
Green	Denis Harrison	261	6.2	+1.8
UKIP	Noel Gardner	243	5.7	+2.1
Majority		1,209	28.5	+2.8
Turnout		4,239	44.4	
Conservative hold		Swing	-0.9	

Parks
Party	Candidate	Votes	%	±%
Labour	Fay Howard	1,115	53.7	+10.6
Conservative	Timothy Swinyard	383	18.4	−8.6
UKIP	Terence Hayward	193	9.3	+2.7
Independent	Graham Cherry	179	8.6	+8.6
Liberal Democrats	Catherine Smith	100	4.8	−9.8
Green	David Miles	75	3.6	+1.9
SDP	Stephen Halden	33	1.6	+1.6
Majority		732	35.2	+19.2
Turnout		2,078	29.6	
Labour hold		Swing	+9.6	

Penhill
Party	Candidate	Votes	%	±%
Labour	Paul Baker	737	52.3	+17.9
Liberal Democrats	Trevor Smith	393	27.9	−11.6
Conservative	Jaki Fairbrother	217	15.4	−4.1
Independent	Caroline Dollery	61	4.3	+4.3
Majority		344	24.4	
Turnout		1,408	31.8	
Labour hold		Swing	+14.2	

Shaw and Nine Elms
Party	Candidate	Votes	%	±%
Conservative	Garry Perkins	1,424	52.0	−2.2
Labour	Michael Heal	769	28.1	+5.9
Liberal Democrats	James Farr	344	12.6	−11.0
UKIP	Robert Feal-Martinez	200	7.3	+7.3
Majority		655	23.9	−6.7
Turnout		2,737	38.8	
Conservative hold		Swing	-4.0	

St Margaret
Party	Candidate	Votes	%	±%
Conservative	Russell Holland	1,609	51.5	+3.9
Labour	Nigel Chalk	1,046	33.5	+3.7
UKIP	Margaret Thompson-Watt	269	8.6	+8.6
Liberal Democrats	Deborah King	199	6.4	−16.2
Majority		563	18.0	+0.1
Turnout		3,123	38.5	
Conservative hold		Swing	+0.1	

St Philip
Party	Candidate	Votes	%	±%
Labour	Joseph Tray	1,540	49.8	+9.5
Conservative	Paul Findlow	1,207	39.0	−2.4
UKIP	Peter Thompson-Watt	228	7.4	+7.4
Liberal Democrats	Ann Richards	119	3.8	−14.5
Majority		333	10.8	
Turnout		3,094	42.9	
Labour gain from Conservative		Swing	+5.9	

Toothill and Westlea
Party	Candidate	Votes	%	±%
Labour	Stephen Wakefield	978	42.8	+16.8
Conservative	Daniel Bissex	946	41.4	−19.3
Liberal Democrats	Christopher Shepherd	140	6.1	−7.1
UKIP	Tiffany Pomagalski	122	5.3	+5.3
Green	Marilyn Harrison	97	4.2	+4.2
Majority		32	1.4	
Turnout		2,283	39.9	
Labour hold		Swing	+18.0	

Walcot
Party	Candidate	Votes	%	±%
Labour	Ellen Osa	1,063	48.9	+10.6
Conservative	Peter Mallinson	768	35.3	−10.9
Liberal Democrats	Kathleen McCarthy	204	9.4	−6.1
Green	Jennifer Miles	139	6.4	+6.4
Majority		295	13.6	
Turnout		2,174	38.8	
Labour gain from Conservative		Swing	+10.7	

Western
Party	Candidate	Votes	%	±%
Labour	Des Moffatt	1,692	58.1	+14.7
Conservative	John Haines	752	25.8	−5.1
UKIP	Gregory Heathcliffe	262	9.0	+9.0
Liberal Democrats	Geoffrey King	208	7.1	−10.3
Majority		940	32.3	+19.8
Turnout		2,914	34.6	
Labour hold		Swing	+9.9	

Wroughton and Chiseldon
Party	Candidate	Votes	%	±%
Conservative	Wayne Crabbe	1,815	47.8	−4.3
Labour	Geraint Day	736	19.4	−5.2
Independent	William Hurst	510	13.4	+13.4
Liberal Democrats	Victor Godman	421	11.1	−12.2
UKIP	Susan Cassell	314	8.3	+8.3
Majority		1,079	28.4	+0.9
Turnout		3,796	45.8	
Conservative hold		Swing	+0.4	
