= Socialist Green Unity Coalition =

Electoral alliance at the 2005 United Kingdom general election

The Socialist Green Unity Coalition was an electoral alliance formed by leftist parties and political organisations in Great Britain prior to 2005 parliamentary election after the Respect Unity Coalition (which the SGUC constituent organisations regarded as little more than a vehicle for the Socialist Workers Party) rejected requests to discuss an electoral arrangement to avoid clashes in 2005. It was established in September 2004, named in November 2004 and publicly launched in February 2005. After the 2005 election the coalition continued to operate as a liaison and co-ordinating body but has not extended its remit much beyond electoral co-ordination.

Participating organisations included the Socialist Party and the Alliance for Green Socialism (standing under their own name), Alliance for Workers' Liberty, Socialist Unity Network (both standing as Socialist Unity) and the Democratic Socialist Alliance, whose candidates in 2005 were also members of the United Socialist Party. Many of these organisations were in the previous Socialist Alliance before they voted to support the established of the Respect Unity Coalition and dissolve the Socialist Alliance.

All the SGUC member organisations campaigned on a common platform including calls for an end to privatisation, for defence of the welfare state, an end to poverty and for full employment. The SGUC also gave greater priority than most of its individual members to the question of the environment and building a sustainable economic system - largely due to the influence of the Alliance for Green Socialism.

== The 2005 elections ==
The Socialist Party contested the 2005 election as Socialist Alternative in Bootle, Brighton Kemptown, Bristol North West, Cardiff South and Penarth, Coventry North East, Coventry South, Leicester West, Lewisham Deptford, Newcastle East and Wallsend, Sheffield Heeley, Stoke-on-Trent Central, Swansea West, Wakefield, Walthamstow, Wythenshawe and Sale East.

Coalition members stood against the Green Party in some constituencies (because the Green Party would not negotiate an electoral arrangement to avoid such clashes) but agreed not to compete with the Respect Coalition or the Scottish Socialist Party. It received over 12,000 in 2005 votes and did not come close to winning any seats and only succeeded in holding its deposit in one seat, Coventry North East, where its candidate was former Militant MP Dave Nellist.

=== Candidates ===
Socialist Alternative Party

- Birmingham Northfield: Louise Houldey (Soc Alt)
- Bootle: Peter Glover (Soc Alt)
- Brighton Kemptown: Phil Clarke (Soc Alt)
- Bristol North West: Graeme Jones (Soc Alt)
- Cardiff South & Penarth: Dave Bartlett (Soc Alt)
- Coventry North East: Dave Nellist (Soc Alt)
- Coventry North West: Nicola Downes (Soc Alt)
- Coventry South: Rob Windsor (Soc Alt)
- Leicester West: Steve Score (Soc Alt)
- Lewisham Deptford: Ian Page (Soc Alt)
- Newcastle upon Tyne East & Wallsend: William Hopwood (Soc Alt)
- Sheffield Heeley: Mark Dunnell (Soc Alt)
- Stoke-on-trent Central: Jim Cessford (Soc Alt)
- Swansea West: Robert Williams (Soc Alt)
- Wakefield: Mick Griffiths (Soc Alt)
- Walthamstow: Nancy Taaffe (Soc Alt)
- Wythenshawe & Sale East: Lynn Worthington (Soc Alt)

Alliance for Green Socialism:

- Brighton Pavilion: Tony Greenstein (Green Soc)
- Kensington & Chelsea: Eddie Adams (Green Soc)
- Leeds North East: Celia Foote (Green Soc)
- Leeds North West: Jeannie Sutton (Green Soc)
- Pontefract & Castleford: Bob Hague (Green Soc)

Democratic Socialist Alliance - People Before Profit

- Liverpool Wavertree: Paul Filby (Dem Soc All)
- Crawley: Robin Burnham (Dem Soc All)

Socialist Unity Network

- Nottingham East: Pete Ratcliff (Soc Unity)
- Swindon North: Andy Newman (Soc Unity)

== After 2005 ==
Following the election, the coalition agreed to remain in existence for future elections and to run a campaign in support of fair pensions. It stood candidates in the 2006 United Kingdom local elections.

== Disbanding ==
The SGUC went into decline following the 2005 general election. As of January 2010, the Socialist Party's continuing membership of SGUC is unclear as they have allied themselves with the TUSC (Trade Unionist and Socialist Coalition) from which other SGUC members (notably the Alliance for Green Socialism) had withdrawn. The Alliance for Green Socialism stood candidates under their own name in 2010, 2015, 2017 and 2019 respectively.

This, and a lack of recent electoral activity, suggests that the SGUC has been dissolved.
