= 2008 Swindon Borough Council election =

2008 UK local government election

Map of the results of the 2008 Swindon council election. Conservatives in blue, Labour in red and Liberal Democrats in yellow. Wards in grey were not contested in 2008.

The 2008 Swindon Borough Council election took place on 4 May 2008 to elect members of Swindon Unitary Council in Wiltshire, England. One third of the council was up for election and the Conservative Party stayed in overall control of the council.

After the election, the composition of the council was

- Conservative 43
- Labour 12
- Liberal Democrat 3
- Independent 1

== Campaign ==
Several unusual events attracted attention during the campaign. A Yorkshire Terrier was reported as having received a polling card for the election, with his owner being faced with being charged with supplying false electoral information and as a result had to write a letter of apology. Meanwhile, Swindon council got a look-alike of Captain Jack Sparrow to hand out balloons and leaflets on the election in an attempt to increase interest in the election.

== Election result ==
The results saw each party end with the same number of seats as before the election with the Conservatives remaining in control with 43 seats. The Conservatives gained one seat from Labour in Park ward but Labour also took a seat back from the Conservatives in Central ward. In total 15 councillors were re-elected with Labour staying on 12 seats, the Liberal Democrats 3 and 1 independent.

Swindon local election result 2008
Party	Seats	Gains	Losses	Net gain/loss	Seats %	Votes %	Votes	+/−
Conservative	17	1	1	0	77.3	54.8	25,109	+8.0%
Labour	4	1	1	0	18.2	25.3	11,567	-3.6%
Liberal Democrats	1	0	0	0	4.5	14.5	6,644	+1.3%
UKIP	0	0	0	0	0	5.0	2,301	+1.3%
Independent	0	0	0	0	0	0.4	181	+0.1%

== Ward results ==
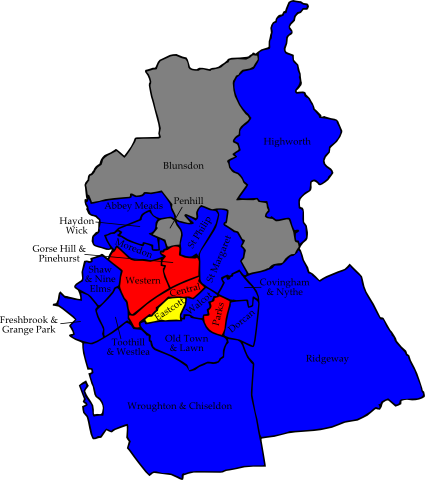
Map of the results of the 2008 Swindon council election with ward names. Coloured by party which finished top in each ward.

Abbey Meads
Party	Candidate	Votes	%	±%
Conservative	Vera Tomlinson	1,836	75.9	+6.6
Labour	Gerald Lawson	266	11.0	−4.9
Liberal Democrats	Richard Law	226	9.3	+0.7
UKIP	Robin Tingey	90	3.7	+3.7
Majority		1,570	64.9	+11.4
Turnout		2,418		
Conservative hold		Swing		

Central
Party	Candidate	Votes	%	±%
Labour	Junab Ali	902	44.1	−3.0
Conservative	Kevin Leakey	664	32.5	+3.9
Liberal Democrats	Hannah Pajak	224	11.0	−2.0
UKIP	Eric Bagwell	130	6.4	+6.4
Independent	David Cox	125	6.1	+1.6
Majority		238	11.6	−6.9
Turnout		2,045		
Labour gain from Conservative		Swing		

Covingham and Nythe
Party	Candidate	Votes	%	±%
Conservative	Dale Heenan	1,362	57.6	+3.4
Labour	Joanne Dilley	586	24.8	−2.1
UKIP	Cynthia Desmond	264	11.2	−0.5
Liberal Democrats	David Pajak	152	6.4	−0.8
Majority		776	32.8	+5.5
Turnout		2,364		
Conservative hold		Swing		

Dorcan (2)
Party	Candidate	Votes	%	±%
Conservative	Kevin Parry	1,326		
Conservative	Roderick Bluh	1,292		
Labour	Cindy Matthews	447		
Labour	Samuel James	430		
UKIP	Robert Sheppard	294		
Liberal Democrats	Ellen Aylett	286		
Turnout		4,075		
Conservative hold		Swing		
Conservative hold		Swing		

Eastcott
Party	Candidate	Votes	%	±%
Liberal Democrats	Stanley Pajak	1,237	58.6	+19.0
Conservative	Paul Gregory	496	23.5	−1.4
Labour	Sarah Bush	378	17.9	−5.8
Majority		741	35.1	+20.3
Turnout		2,111		
Liberal Democrats hold		Swing		

Freshbrook and Grange Park
Party	Candidate	Votes	%	±%
Conservative	Peter Greenhalgh	1,184	60.4	+11.4
Liberal Democrats	Judith Peppitt	535	27.3	−1.2
Labour	Jamal Miah	240	12.3	−4.4
Majority		649	33.1	+12.5
Turnout		1,959		
Conservative hold		Swing		

Gorse Hill and Pinehurst
Party	Candidate	Votes	%	±%
Labour	Ericqua Ballman	736	44.6	−0.2
Conservative	Louise Gallavin	687	41.6	+16.0
Liberal Democrats	Leslie Wood	229	13.9	+5.8
Majority		49	3.0	−16.3
Turnout		1,652		
Labour hold		Swing		

Haydon Wick
Party	Candidate	Votes	%	±%
Conservative	Rex Barnett	1,363	61.0	
Labour	John Keepin	440	19.7	
UKIP	Michael Stuckey	246	11.0	
Liberal Democrats	Tel Hudson	186	8.3	
Majority		923	41.3	
Turnout		2,235		
Conservative hold		Swing		

Highworth
Party	Candidate	Votes	%	±%
Conservative	Anthony Peake	1,345	62.3	+5.5
Labour	Phillip Beaumont	492	22.8	−3.7
Liberal Democrats	Jennifer Shorten	321	14.9	+7.9
Majority		853	39.5	+9.2
Turnout		2,158		
Conservative hold		Swing		

Moredon
Party	Candidate	Votes	%	±%
Conservative	Colin Lovell	1,110	54.4	+6.7
Labour	James d'Avila	590	28.9	−6.7
UKIP	Kathleen Webb	229	11.2	+2.4
Liberal Democrats	Heidi Teague	111	5.4	−2.5
Majority		520	25.5	+13.4
Turnout		2,040		
Conservative hold		Swing		

Old Town and Lawn
Party	Candidate	Votes	%	±%
Conservative	Michael Bawden	2,015	64.2	+5.5
Liberal Democrats	Mark Wheaver	538	17.1	+1.5
Labour	Walid Meah	409	13.0	−0.4
UKIP	Noel Gardner	177	5.6	+0.4
Majority		1,477	47.1	+4.0
Turnout		3,139		
Conservative hold		Swing		

Parks (2)
Party	Candidate	Votes	%	±%
Labour	Stephen Allsopp	815		
Conservative	Graham Cherry	746		
Labour	Mark Dempsey	703		
Conservative	Claire Ellis	628		
UKIP	Terence Hayward	248		
Liberal Democrats	Mark Grant	153		
Liberal Democrats	John Kurton	125		
Turnout		3,418		
Labour hold		Swing		
Conservative gain from Labour		Swing		

Ridgeway
Party	Candidate	Votes	%	±%
Conservative	Andrew Bennett	652	61.6	+6.9
Liberal Democrats	Thomas Pajak	351	33.1	−2.8
Labour	Mary Gladman	56	5.3	−4.1
Majority		301	28.4	+9.5
Turnout		1,059		
Conservative hold		Swing		

Shaw and Nine Elms
Party	Candidate	Votes	%	±%
Conservative	Nicholas Martin	1,291	70.5	+14.4
Liberal Democrats	James Farr	333	18.2	+0.5
Labour	Mohammad Talukdar	208	11.4	−5.5
Majority		958	52.3	+13.9
Turnout		1,832		
Conservative hold		Swing		

St Margaret
Party	Candidate	Votes	%	±%
Conservative	Raymond Fisher	1,337	59.2	+7.4
Labour	Michael Spry	517	22.9	−5.6
UKIP	Robert Feal-Martinez	217	9.6	+0.2
Liberal Democrats	Ann Morgan	187	8.3	−2.0
Majority		820	36.3	+12.9
Turnout		2,258		
Conservative hold		Swing		

St Philip
Party	Candidate	Votes	%	±%
Conservative	Maire Darker	1,300	52.7	+10.8
Labour	Joseph Tray	771	31.3	−9.4
UKIP	Peter Thompson-Watt	232	9.4	+2.3
Liberal Democrats	Ann Richards	163	6.6	+0.4
Majority		529	21.5	+20.3
Turnout		2,466		
Conservative hold		Swing		

Toothill & Westlea
Party	Candidate	Votes	%	±%
Conservative	Dwynwen Martin	961	60.7	+8.4
Labour	Abdul Amin	412	26.0	+4.1
Liberal Democrats	Christopher Shepherd	209	13.2	−2.7
Majority		549	34.7	+4.4
Turnout		1,582		
Conservative hold		Swing		

Walcot
Party	Candidate	Votes	%	±%
Conservative	Mavis Childs	783	46.2	+7.2
Labour	Carol Heavens	648	38.3	+1.6
Liberal Democrats	Kathleen McCarthy	263	15.5	+2.6
Majority		135	8.0	+5.7
Turnout		1,694		
Conservative hold		Swing		

Western
Party	Candidate	Votes	%	±%
Labour	James Grant	1,161	45.6	−3.8
Conservative	Peter Heaton-Jones	990	38.9	+13.4
UKIP	Gregory Heathcliffe	174	6.8	−0.5
Liberal Democrats	Clive Hooper	166	6.5	−3.0
Independent	Michael Morton	56	2.2	−0.1
Majority		171	6.7	−17.1
Turnout		2,547		
Labour hold		Swing		

Wroughton and Chiseldon
Party	Candidate	Votes	%	±%
Conservative	Brian Ford	1,741	63.3	+8.0
Liberal Democrats	Victor Godman	649	23.6	+1.2
Labour	Sandra Parsons	360	13.1	−1.7
Majority		1,092	39.7	+6.8
Turnout		2,750		
Conservative hold		Swing		
