= Socialist Unity Network =

The Socialist Unity Network was a small network of the far-left in the United Kingdom which was not affiliated with any single political party. It grew out of the Socialist Alliance (SA) in England, and was initiated by several non-aligned members of the SA executive in March 2004.

Members of the network were supporters of Respect – The Unity Coalition and other left electoral initiatives including the Green Party. The main aspect of the network was its now defunct website, which had regularly updated articles from a wide range of socialist perspectives on issues including the possibilities of creating socialist unity.

== History ==
The network was formed in March 2004 by several non-aligned members of the Socialist Alliance in England, and grew to include left-wing activists from a range of political parties and campaigning organisations, and those with no party affiliation. It was centrally involved in the debates around the winding down of the Socialist Alliance and the formation of Respect. It produced its own leaflets on occasions and in the 2005 General Election some members of the network stood as "Socialist Unity" candidates, providing a banner under which independent socialists could choose to stand, as part of the Socialist Green Unity Coalition, a coalition with the Socialist Party.

Socialist Unity candidates stood again in the 2006 council elections, gaining over 5% of the vote in Swindon, and over 10% in Hackney. The network also produced a 2005 election guide with Red Pepper magazine.

Leading members included Jim Jepps (later a Green Party activist), Declan O'Neill, Andy Newman (later a Labour Party member), Matthew Caygill, John Nicholson, Martin Wicks (of Swindon Trades Council), Pete Green, Nick Bird, Salman Shaheen (journalist, and co-editor of Third Estate blog), Reuben Rosenberg (journalist, and co-editor of Third Estate blog) and Tawfiq Chahboune.

== Core beliefs ==
The "who we are" section on the socialist unity network webpage stated:

The Socialist Unity Network originated in the Socialist Alliance. It is not a political group conceived to add to the competition between the many socialist organisations which already exist. It is a network of activists which campaigns for the widest practical collaboration of left groups and movements resisting the attacks of the Blair government.

In England the left has failed to make the break with the sectarian legacy that has dogged the "far left" for so long. Such divisions undermine our ability to build a fightback against the Blair government.

The Socialist Unity Network therefore believes that, in the interests of building resistance and striving to create the conditions in which a socialist alternative to New Labour can emerge, it is necessary to strive to develop collaborative methods of working as widely as possible. This is similar to the process that led to the formation of the SSP in Scotland, which was the result of a number of years of common work and discussion which enabled previously competing and sometimes hostile organisations to overcome old antagonisms and to develop greater political agreement.
