= 2004 Swindon Borough Council election =

2004 UK local government election

Map of the results of the 2004 Swindon council election. Conservatives in blue, Labour in red and Liberal Democrats in yellow. Wards in grey were not contested in 2004.

The 2004 Swindon Borough Council election took place on 10 June 2004 to elect members of Swindon Unitary Council in Wiltshire, England. One third of the council was up for election and the Conservative Party gained overall control of the council from no overall control.

After the election, the composition of the council was

- Conservative 33
- Labour 19
- Liberal Democrat 7

== Election result ==
Swindon local election result 2004
Party	Seats	Gains	Losses	Net gain/loss	Seats %	Votes %	Votes	+/−
Conservative	14			+4	70.0	45.1	19,466	+3.3%
Labour	5			-3	25.0	27.8	11,971	-2.9%
Liberal Democrats	1			-1	5.0	20.3	8,749	-5.0%
Green	0			0	0	4.9	2,101	+4.3%
UKIP	0			0	0	0.7	311	+0.0%
Socialist Alliance	0			0	0	0.6	249	-0.1%
Independent	0			0	0	0.4	166	+0.4%
Socialist	0			0	0	0.2	105	+0.2%

== Ward results ==
Abbey Meads
Party	Candidate	Votes	%	±%
Conservative	Charles Lister	641	58.2	−6.7
Labour	James Grant	232	21.1	+4.2
Liberal Democrats	Richard Law	228	20.7	+2.6
Majority		409	37.1	−9.7
Turnout		1,101		

Central
Party	Candidate	Votes	%	±%
Labour	Sinead Maire Darker	796	42.6	+5.0
Conservative	Matthew McCue	479	25.6	+8.1
Liberal Democrats	Tel Hudson	363	19.4	−19.2
Green	Karsten Evans	161	8.6	+8.6
Socialist Alliance	Andrew Newman	69	3.7	+3.7
Majority		317	17.0	
Turnout		1,868		

Covingham and Nythe
Party	Candidate	Votes	%	±%
Conservative	Dale Heenan	1,327	52.1	−1.3
Labour	Patricia Spry	834	32.7	+1.8
Liberal Democrats	Ellen Aylett	386	15.2	−0.5
Majority		493	19.4	−3.1
Turnout		2,547		

Dorcan
Party	Candidate	Votes	%	±%
Conservative	Roderick Bluh	1,232	50.6	+6.6
Labour	David Cox	792	32.5	−9.7
Liberal Democrats	Kathleen McCarthy	411	16.9	+3.1
Majority		440	18.1	+16.3
Turnout		2,435		

Eastcott
Party	Candidate	Votes	%	±%
Liberal Democrats	Stanley Pajak	978	46.2	−7.5
Conservative	Brenda Craven	452	21.3	+1.0
Labour	Richard Young	443	20.9	−5.1
Green	Christine Smith	245	11.6	+11.6
Majority		526	24.8	−3.0
Turnout		2,118		

Freshbrook and Grange Park
Party	Candidate	Votes	%	±%
Conservative	Peter Greenhalgh	1,013	42.7	+8.2
Liberal Democrats	Tracy Fisher	942	39.7	−7.2
Labour	Sarah Bush	418	17.6	−1.0
Majority		71	3.0	
Turnout		2,373		

Gorse Hill and Pinehurst
Party	Candidate	Votes	%	±%
Labour	Ericqua Ballman	701	44.2	+3.8
Conservative	Halina Roberts	429	27.1	+3.8
Liberal Democrats	Jacob Pajak	275	17.4	−6.2
Socialist Alliance	Roy North	180	11.4	−1.3
Majority		272	17.2	+0.4
Turnout		1,585		

Haydon Wick
Party	Candidate	Votes	%	±%
Conservative	Wayne Lawley	1,271	54.7	+2.2
Labour	John Keepin	576	24.8	−2.5
Liberal Democrats	Derek Richards	475	20.5	+0.3
Majority		695	29.9	+4.7
Turnout		2,322		

Highworth
Party	Candidate	Votes	%	±%
Conservative	Anthony Peake	1,260	51.1	+3.9
Labour	Lynn Vardy	633	25.7	−9.0
Liberal Democrats	Jennifer Shorten	371	15.1	−3.0
Green	Andrew Day	200	8.1	+8.1
Majority		627	25.4	+13.0
Turnout		2,464		

Moredon
Party	Candidate	Votes	%	±%
Conservative	Colin Lovell	954	44.1	+5.1
Labour	James D'Avila	830	38.4	−2.1
Liberal Democrats	Andrew Sharp	274	12.7	−2.8
Socialist	Jean Walker	105	4.9	+4.9
Majority		124	5.7	
Turnout		2,163		

Old Town and Lawn
Party	Candidate	Votes	%	±%
Conservative	Michael Bawden	1,954	56.0	+1.2
Liberal Democrats	Mark Wheaver	883	25.3	−6.5
Green	John Hughes	342	9.8	+3.4
Labour	Michael Szymanski	308	8.8	+1.7
Majority		1,071	30.7	+7.7
Turnout		3,487		

Parks
Party	Candidate	Votes	%	±%
Labour	Stephen Allsopp	686	43.7	−10.0
Conservative	Natasha Young	371	23.6	−0.7
Liberal Democrats	Helen Thompson	340	21.6	−0.4
Green	Melvin Collins	174	11.1	+11.1
Majority		315	20.1	−9.4
Turnout		1,571		

Ridgeway
Party	Candidate	Votes	%	±%
Conservative	Andrew Bennett	600	54.7	
Liberal Democrats	Adelaide Dudman	393	35.9	
Labour	Ruairi Tobin	103	9.4	
Majority		207	18.9	
Turnout		1,096		

Shaw and Nine Elms
Party	Candidate	Votes	%	±%
Conservative	Nicholas Martin	1,213	54.9	+5.7
Labour	Neil Heavens	353	16.0	−8.9
Liberal Democrats	Amber Johnson	307	13.9	−12.0
Green	Linda Lee	170	7.7	+7.7
Independent	James Withey	166	7.5	+7.5
Majority		860	38.9	+15.7
Turnout		2,209		

St Margaret
Party	Candidate	Votes	%	±%
Conservative	Raymond Fisher	1,302	54.4	+0.0
Labour	Michael Spry	647	27.0	−2.0
Liberal Democrats	David Payne	445	18.6	+1.9
Majority		655	27.4	+2.0
Turnout		2,394		

St Philip
Party	Candidate	Votes	%	±%
Conservative	Philip Sharp	1,182	43.9	−1.7
Labour	Teresa Page	1,091	40.6	+2.4
Liberal Democrats	Jose Tocha	240	8.9	−7.3
Green	Raymond Smith	177	6.6	+6.6
Majority		91	3.4	−4.1
Turnout		2,690		

Toothill and Westlea
Party	Candidate	Votes	%	±%
Conservative	Dwynwen Martin	841	48.2	−2.2
Labour	Norman Butler	443	25.4	−3.5
Liberal Democrats	Judith Peppitt	259	14.9	−5.8
Green	Marilyn Harrison	201	11.5	+11.5
Majority		398	22.8	+1.2
Turnout		1,744		

Walcot
Party	Candidate	Votes	%	±%
Labour	Mavis Childs	745	41.8	+6.4
Conservative	Russell Holland	601	33.7	−7.2
Liberal Democrats	David Pajak	307	17.2	−6.5
Green	Simon Smith	128	7.2	+7.2
Majority		144	8.1	
Turnout		1,781		

Western
Party	Candidate	Votes	%	±%
Labour	Michael Barnes	928	38.4	−4.9
Conservative	Mark Edwards	805	33.3	+7.3
UKIP	Michael Morton	311	12.9	+4.5
Liberal Democrats	Rebecca Poole	251	10.4	−11.9
Green	Raymond Burcham	121	5.0	+5.0
Majority		123	5.1	−12.2
Turnout		2416		

Wroughton and Chiseldon
Party	Candidate	Votes	%	±%
Conservative	Brian Ford	1,539	55.9	+9.7
Liberal Democrats	Victor Godman	621	22.5	−11.7
Labour	Sandra Parsons	412	15.0	−4.6
Green	Robert Heritage	182	6.6	+6.6
Majority		918	33.3	+21.3
Turnout		2,754		
