= 2002 Swindon Borough Council election =

2002 UK local government election

Map of the results of the 2002 Swindon council election. Labour in red, Conservatives in blue and Liberal Democrats in yellow. Wards in grey were not contested in 2002.

The 2002 Swindon Borough Council election took place on 2 May 2002 to elect members of Swindon Unitary Council in Wiltshire, England. One third of the council was up for election and the council stayed under no overall control.

After the election, the composition of the council was

- Labour 29
- Conservative 22
- Liberal Democrat 8

== Voting pilot ==
The election in Swindon was one of thirty that trialed different methods of voting or counting in the 2002 local elections, with Swindon having a trial of voting via the internet. The trial results had 5% of voters using the phone to cast a vote and over 10% voting via the internet. A survey in Swindon found that those who voted via the Internet were more likely to be younger and male than those who voted at a polling station. Overall turnout in the election was 31.33%.

== Election result ==
Swindon local election result 2002
Party	Seats	Gains	Losses	Net gain/loss	Seats %	Votes %	Votes	+/−
Labour	9	1	1	0	47.4	34.2	13,539	
Conservative	7	1	1	0	36.8	38.6	15,250	
Liberal Democrats	3	0	0	0	15.8	24.3	9,609	
Green	0	0	0	0	0	1.8	703	
Socialist Alliance	0	0	0	0	0	0.4	170	
Rock 'n' Roll Loony	0	0	0	0	0	0.3	138	
Independent	0	0	0	0	0	0.3	128	

== Ward results ==
Abbey Meads
Party	Candidate	Votes	%	±%
Conservative	Justin Tomlinson	705	70.4	
Labour	Michelle Mahon	195	19.5	
Liberal Democrats	Katherine Pajak	101	10.1	
Majority		510	50.9	
Turnout		1,001	28.9	
Conservative hold		Swing		

Blunsdon
Party	Candidate	Votes	%	±%
Conservative	Doreen Dart	796	72.2	
Labour	Lynn Vardy	160	14.5	
Liberal Democrats	Ruth Fitchett	146	13.2	
Majority		636	57.7	
Turnout		1,102	42.1	
Conservative hold		Swing		

Central
Party	Candidate	Votes	%	±%
Labour	David Nash	758	41.9	
Liberal Democrats	Michael Dickinson	628	34.7	
Conservative	Peter Bates	300	16.6	
Green	Simon Smith	85	4.7	
Rock 'n' Roll Loony	John Stuart	37	2.0	
Majority		130	7.2	
Turnout		1,808	25.4	
Labour hold		Swing		

Covingham and Nythe
Party	Candidate	Votes	%	±%
Labour	Maureen Dilley	1,188	47.8	
Conservative	Angela Watts	984	39.6	
Liberal Democrats	Adelaide Dudman	313	12.6	
Majority		204	8.2	
Turnout		2,485	35.7	
Labour hold		Swing		

Dorcan
Party	Candidate	Votes	%	±%
Labour	David Wren	1,056	44.5	
Conservative	Garry Perkins	986	41.6	
Liberal Democrats	Mark Wheaver	275	11.6	
Rock 'n' Roll Loony	Bridget Jeffery	55	2.3	
Majority		70	3.0	
Turnout		2,372	34.2	
Labour gain from Conservative		Swing		

Eastcott
Party	Candidate	Votes	%	±%
Liberal Democrats	Michael Evemy	1,030	47.8	
Labour	Richard Young	571	26.5	
Conservative	Russell Holland	352	16.3	
Green	Christine Smith	155	7.2	
Rock 'n' Roll Loony	Roland Gillard	46	2.1	
Majority		459	21.3	
Turnout		2,154	28.1	
Liberal Democrats hold		Swing		

Freshbrook and Grange Park
Party	Candidate	Votes	%	±%
Liberal Democrats	Christopher Shepherd	879	40.9	
Conservative	Michael Bray	746	34.7	
Labour	Phil Rashid	526	24.5	
Majority		133	6.2	
Turnout		2,151	28.1	
Liberal Democrats hold		Swing		

Gorse Hill and Pinehurst
Party	Candidate	Votes	%	±%
Labour	Maurice Fanning	847	54.3	
Conservative	Mark Furkins	376	24.1	
Socialist Alliance	Andrew Newman	170	10.9	
Liberal Democrats	Jacob Pajak	168	10.8	
Majority		471	30.2	
Turnout		1,561	22.7	
Labour hold		Swing		

Haydon Wick
Party	Candidate	Votes	%	±%
Conservative	David Renard	1,133	47.9	
Labour	Fay Howard	821	34.7	
Liberal Democrats	Tel Hudson	411	17.4	
Majority		312	13.2	
Turnout		2,365	30.0	
Conservative gain from Labour		Swing		

Highworth
Party	Candidate	Votes	%	±%
Conservative	Lisa Hawkes	1,293	50.5	
Labour	Peter Mallinson	719	28.1	
Liberal Democrats	Jenny Shorten	550	21.5	
Majority		574	22.4	
Turnout		2,562	38.7	
Conservative hold		Swing		

Moredon
Party	Candidate	Votes	%	±%
Labour	Derique Montaut	843	46.4	
Conservative	Kirt Wakefield	646	35.5	
Liberal Democrats	Nigel Bass	329	18.1	
Majority		197	10.8	
Turnout		1,818	24.7	
Labour hold		Swing		

Old Town and Lawn
Party	Candidate	Votes	%	±%
Liberal Democrats	Wendy Johnson	1,933	48.9	
Conservative	Colin Lovell	1,603	40.5	
Labour	John Newman	273	6.9	
Green	John Hughes	147	3.7	
Majority		330	8.3	
Turnout		3,956	52.7	
Liberal Democrats hold		Swing		

Parks
Party	Candidate	Votes	%	±%
Labour	Barrie Thompson	973	64.4	
Conservative	Natasha Young	293	19.4	
Liberal Democrats	Ellen Aylett	245	16.2	
Majority		680	45.0	
Turnout		1,511	21.8	
Labour hold		Swing		

Penhill
Party	Candidate	Votes	%	±%
Labour	David Glaholm	687	59.5	
Liberal Democrats	Clive Fitchett	253	21.9	
Conservative	Donald Day	215	18.6	
Majority		434	37.6	
Turnout		1,155	25.7	
Labour hold		Swing		

Shaw and Nine Elms
Party	Candidate	Votes	%	±%
Conservative	Douglas Stewart	1,000	53.2	
Labour	Neil Heavens	502	26.7	
Liberal Democrats	John Phipps	379	20.1	
Majority		498	26.5	
Turnout		1,881	27.2	
Conservative hold		Swing		

St Margaret
Party	Candidate	Votes	%	±%
Conservative	Bernard Baker	1,069	47.2	
Labour	Alison Durrant	897	39.6	
Liberal Democrats	John Newman	300	13.2	
Majority		172	7.6	
Turnout		2,266	30.5	
Conservative hold		Swing		

St Philip
Party	Candidate	Votes	%	±%
Labour	Philip Steele	1,006	45.4	
Conservative	Raymond Fisher	882	39.8	
Liberal Democrats	Martin Wiltshire	214	9.7	
Green	Raymond Smith	113	5.1	
Majority		124	5.6	
Turnout		2,215	31.2	
Labour hold		Swing		

Western
Party	Candidate	Votes	%	±%
Labour	Kevin Small	1,068	50.2	
Conservative	Paul Saunders	535	25.2	
Liberal Democrats	Elizabeth Clifton-Page	301	14.2	
Independent	Michael Morton	128	6.0	
Green	Robert Heritage	94	4.4	
Majority		533	25.1	
Turnout		2,126	28.5	
Labour hold		Swing		

Wroughton and Chiseldon
Party	Candidate	Votes	%	±%
Conservative	Jemima Milton	1,336	43.8	
Liberal Democrats	Clive Hooper	1,154	37.9	
Labour	Andy Harrison	449	14.7	
Green	James Bevan	109	3.6	
Majority		182	6.0	
Turnout		3,048	40.0	
Conservative hold		Swing		
