= 1973 Thamesdown Borough Council election =

1973 English local election

June 7, 1973	1976 →

46 seats to Thamesdown Borough Council 24 seats needed for a majority

	First party	Second party
Leader			Independents
Party	Labour	Conservative
Last election	N/A	N/A	N/A
Seats won	26	18	2
Seats after	26	18	2
Seat change	▲26	▲18	▲2

The 1973 Thamesdown Borough Council election took place on 7 June 1973 to elect members of Thamesdown Borough Council, a predecessor to Swindon Borough Council in Swindon, Wiltshire, England. It was the first election to the district council, although it acted as a "shadow authority" until 1 April 1974, where it gained full responsibilities as laid out in the Local Government Act 1972.

The whole council was up for election, and Labour gained a majority, winning 26 out of 46 seats on the council.

Thamesdown Borough Council election 1973
Party	Seats	Gains	Losses	Net gain/loss	Seats %	Votes %	Votes	+/−
Labour	26	26	0	+26	56.5	54.9	62,427	N/A
Conservative	18	18	0	+18	39.1	31.9	35,381	N/A
Independent	2	2	0	+2	4.3	2.6	2,947	N/A
Liberal	0	0	0	0	0.0	11.1	12,577	N/A
Communist	0	0	0	0	0.0	0.4	478	N/A

== Results by ward ==
Blundson
Party	Candidate	Votes	%	±%
Conservative	G. Law	456	44.4	N/A
Independent	C. Jones	341	33.2	N/A
Labour	V. Baxter	189	18.4	N/A
Liberal	I. Grigg	41	4.0	N/A
Majority		115	43.4	N/A
Turnout		N/A	51.1	N/A
Registered electors		1,977		
Conservative win (new seat)				

Chiseldon
Party	Candidate	Votes	%	±%
Independent	S. Daniels	457	54.9	N/A
Labour	L. Blackman	375	45.1	N/A
Majority		82	9.9	N/A
Turnout		N/A	46.9	N/A
Registered electors		1,805		
Independent win (new seat)				

Highworth (2)
Party	Candidate	Votes	%	±%
Labour	Ms. E. Hazell	881	21.5	N/A
Independent	A. Burke Jones	844	20.6	N/A
Labour	J. Merriman	747	18.3	N/A
Conservative	E. Hudson	669	16.4	N/A
Conservative	M. Smith	572	14.0	N/A
Independent	G. Hawkes	378	9.2	N/A
Turnout		N/A	49.7	N/A
Registered electors		4,518		
Labour win (new seat)				
Independent win (new seat)				

North Swindon (6)
Party	Candidate	Votes	%	±%
Labour	L. Gowing	1,491	13.2	N/A
Labour	A. Durston	1,461	13.0	N/A
Labour	F. Cullen	1,459	13.0	N/A
Labour	J. Uzzell	1,415	12.5	N/A
Labour	A. Masters	1,413	12.5	N/A
Labour	Ms. I. Angelinetta	1,308	11.6	N/A
Conservative	F. Ashplant	467	4.1	N/A
Conservative	Ms. J. Ashplant	454	4.0	N/A
Conservative	I. Wilson	410	3.6	N/A
Conservative	Ms. I. Wilson	406	3.6	N/A
Conservative	M. Pitt	401	3.5	N/A
Conservative	Ms. E Thorp	395	3.5	N/A
Communist	W. Reeves	217	2.0	N/A
Turnout		N/A	18.7	N/A
Registered electors		11,628		
Labour win (new seat)				
Labour win (new seat)				
Labour win (new seat)				
Labour win (new seat)				
Labour win (new seat)				
Labour win (new seat)				

Wanborough (2)
Party	Candidate	Votes	%	±%
Conservative	J. Heyes	634	20.0	N/A
Conservative	Ms. G. Clasper	613	19.4	N/A
Labour	A. Paginton	534	16.9	N/A
Independent	G. Powell	494	15.6	N/A
Labour	E. Wareham	455	14.4	N/A
Independent	E. Bishop	433	13.7	N/A
Turnout		N/A	42	N/A
Registered electors		4,258		
Conservative win (new seat)				
Conservative win (new seat)				

West Swindon (6)
Party	Candidate	Votes	%	±%
Labour	L. Smith	2,292	13.6	N/A
Labour	D. Morgan	2,249	13.4	N/A
Labour	Ms. I. Redman	2,248	13.4	N/A
Labour	R. Smith	2,219	13.2	N/A
Labour	N. Fisher	2,201	13.1	N/A
Labour	R. Clarke	2,144	12.7	N/A
Conservative	R. Savage	1,886	11.2	N/A
Liberal	V. Horsburgh	667	4.0	N/A
Liberal	Ms. R. Grigg	667	4.0	N/A
Communist	E. Poole	261	1.6	N/A
Turnout		N/A	39.9	N/A
Registered electors		14,386		
Labour win (new seat)				
Labour win (new seat)				
Labour win (new seat)				
Labour win (new seat)				
Labour win (new seat)				
Labour win (new seat)				

Queens (3)
Party	Candidate	Votes	%	±%
Labour	P. Furkins	704	17.0	N/A
Labour	A. Roberts	683	16.4	N/A
Labour	D. Hobbs	658	15.8	N/A
Liberal	Ms. B. Schofield	634	15.2	N/A
Liberal	P. Chadwick	629	15.1	N/A
Liberal	M. Williams	616	14.8	N/A
Conservative	A. Macdonalds	85	2.0	N/A
Conservative	Ms. C. Hinch	79	1.9	N/A
Conservative	B. Blizzard	73	1.8	N/A
Turnout		N/A	41.7	N/A
Registered electors		3,494		
Labour win (new seat)				
Labour win (new seat)				
Labour win (new seat)				

Kings (3)
Party	Candidate	Votes	%	±%
Conservative	L. Baxter	748	14.7	N/A
Conservative	M. Bawden	669	13.1	N/A
Conservative	F. Richards	637	12.5	N/A
Labour	J. Booth	634	12.4	N/A
Labour	M. Lane	631	12.4	N/A
Labour	J. Cordon	579	11.4	N/A
Liberal	R. Scarfe	444	8.8	N/A
Liberal	J. Schofield	392	7.7	N/A
Liberal	R. Walker	359	7.0	N/A
Turnout		N/A	42.9	N/A
Registered electors		4,175		
Conservative win (new seat)				
Conservative win (new seat)				
Conservative win (new seat)				

East Swindon (6)
Party	Candidate	Votes	%	±%
Conservative	Ms. D. Bampton	1,351	8.9	N/A
Conservative	H. Matthews	1,333	8.8	N/A
Conservative	W. Davies	1,287	8.5	N/A
Conservative	M. Warr	1,270	8.4	N/A
Labour	B. Smith	1,262	8.3	N/A
Labour	J. Warren	1,259	8.3	N/A
Labour	M. Walters	1,255	8.3	N/A
Labour	L. Wass	1,254	8.3	N/A
Labour	D. Glaholm	1,244	8.2	N/A
Conservative	B. Tompson	1,233	8.1	N/A
Conservative	E. White	1,223	8.1	N/A
Labour	E. Rutson	1,216	8.0	N/A
Turnout		N/A	30.5	N/A
Registered electors		9,089		
Conservative win (new seat)				
Conservative win (new seat)				
Conservative win (new seat)				
Conservative win (new seat)				
Labour win (new seat)				
Labour win (new seat)				

South Swindon (6)
Party	Candidate	Votes	%	±%
Conservative	S. Macpherson	2,328	7.5	N/A
Conservative	Ms. F. Mortimer	2,269	7.3	N/A
Conservative	J. Pass	2,194	7.1	N/A
Conservative	C. Beard	2,161	7.0	N/A
Conservative	J. Stevens	2,081	6.7	N/A
Conservative	W. Turpin	2,041	6.6	N/A
Labour	A. Bown	1,931	6.2	N/A
Labour	P. Hatcher	1,647	5.3	N/A
Labour	Ms. L. Dowdall-Marsh	1,646	5.3	N/A
Labour	Ms. G. Rogers	1,629	5.3	N/A
Labour	E. Marsh	1,582	5.1	N/A
Labour	P. Hayes	1,557	5.0	N/A
Liberal	J. Newman	1,524	5.0	N/A
Liberal	Ms. J Richards	1,463	4.8	N/A
Liberal	G. Eggers	1,270	4.1	N/A
Liberal	Ms. J. Dinning	1,253	4.0	N/A
Liberal	Ms. M. Powell	1,219	4.0	N/A
Liberal	G. McMullin	1,183	3.8	N/A
Turnout		N/A	33.3	N/A
Registered electors		19,563		
Conservative win (new seat)				
Conservative win (new seat)				
Conservative win (new seat)				
Conservative win (new seat)				
Conservative win (new seat)				
Conservative win (new seat)				

Stratton St. Margaret (6)
Party	Candidate	Votes	%	±%
Labour	A. Miles	2,297	14.9	N/A
Labour	W. Hayward	2,113	13.7	N/A
Labour	Ms. B. Brettell	2,050	13.3	N/A
Labour	P. Jefferies	1,959	12.7	N/A
Labour	W. Winton	1,926	12.5	N/A
Labour	W. Warman	1,888	12.2	N/A
Conservative	Ms. B. Hall	1,106	7.2	N/A
Conservative	A. Macuen	1,090	7.1	N/A
Conservative	R. Stainer	1,021	6.6	N/A
Turnout		N/A	24.1	N/A
Registered electors		13,583		
Labour win (new seat)				
Labour win (new seat)				
Labour win (new seat)				
Labour win (new seat)				
Labour win (new seat)				
Labour win (new seat)				

Haydon Wick
Party	Candidate	Votes	%	±%
Labour	W. Wilks	484	45.4	N/A
Conservative	G. Francis	367	34.4	N/A
Liberal	E. Williams	216	20.2	N/A
Majority		117	11.0	N/A
Turnout		N/A	48.9	N/A
Registered electors		2,200		
Labour win (new seat)				

Queens (3)
Party	Candidate	Votes	%	±%
Conservative	W. Jones McKanan	1,317	22.8	N/A
Conservative	Ms. W. Reynolds	1,124	19.4	N/A
Labour	H. Garrett	930	16.1	N/A
Conservative	J. Hardacre	817	14.1	N/A
Labour	R. Bulmer	813	14.1	N/A
Labour	J. Brawley	785	13.6	N/A
Turnout		N/A	41.0	N/A
Registered electors		5,223		
Conservative win (new seat)				
Conservative win (new seat)				
Labour win (new seat)				
