= 1999 Swindon Borough Council election =

1999 UK local government election

The 1999 Swindon Borough Council election took place on 6 May 1999 to elect members of Swindon Unitary Council in Wiltshire, England. One third of the council was up for election and the Labour party stayed in overall control of the council.

After the election, the composition of the council was

- Labour: 39
- Liberal Democrat: 10
- Conservative: 5

== Election result ==
Overall turnout in the election was 25.6%.

Swindon local election result 1999
Party	Seats	Gains	Losses	Net gain/loss	Seats %	Votes %	Votes	+/−
Labour	14			-1	77.8	47.6		-0.4%
Liberal Democrats	4			+1	22.2	23.8		+4.0%
Conservative	0			0	0	27.4		-3.5%
