= 1998 Swindon Borough Council election =

1998 UK local government election

The 1998 Swindon Borough Council election took place on 7 May 1998 to elect members of Swindon Unitary Council in Wiltshire, England. One third of the council was up for election and the Labour party stayed in overall control of the council.

After the election, the composition of the council was

- Labour 40
- Liberal Democrat 9
- Conservative 5

== Election result ==
Overall turnout in the election was 25%.

Swindon local election result 1998
Party	Seats	Gains	Losses	Net gain/loss	Seats %	Votes %	Votes	+/−
Labour	11			+1	61.1	48.0		
Conservative	4			+2	22.2	30.9		
Liberal Democrats	3			0	16.7	19.8		
Independent	0			-3	0			
