= 2010 Swindon Borough Council election =

2010 UK local government election

Map of the results of the 2010 Swindon council election. Conservatives in blue, Labour in red and Liberal Democrats in yellow. Wards in grey were not contested in 2010.

The 2010 Swindon Borough Council election took place on 6 May 2010 to elect members of Swindon Unitary Council in Wiltshire, England. One third of the council was up for election and the Conservative Party stayed in overall control of the council.

After the election, the composition of the council was

- Conservative 41
- Labour 13
- Liberal Democrat 4
- Independent 1

== Election result ==
The Conservatives retained their majority in the election, just losing one seat to have 41 councillors. The Conservative defeat came in Parks ward with Labour gaining the seat, while the only other change came in Penhill where the Liberal Democrats gained a previously independent seat. Among the Conservatives to retain a seat was the leader of the council, Roderick Bluh, who held Dorcan by a reduced majority of 460. After the election the other parties on the council were Labour with 13 seats, Liberal Democrats 4 and 1 independent.

Swindon local election result 2010
Party	Seats	Gains	Losses	Net gain/loss	Seats %	Votes %	Votes	+/−
Conservative	13	0	1	-1	68.4	42.5	38,248	-12.3%
Labour	4	1	0	+1	21.1	30.5	27,402	+5.2%
Liberal Democrats	2	1	0	+1	10.5	21.8	19,579	+7.3%
UKIP	0	0	0	0	0	2.0	1,820	-3.0%
BNP	0	0	0	0	0	1.9	1,721	+1.9%
Green	0	0	0	0	0	1.1	1,016	+1.1%
Independent	0	0	1	-1	0	0.2	144	-0.2%

== Ward results ==
Abbey Meads
Party	Candidate	Votes	%	±%
Conservative	Peter Heaton-Jones	4,377	55.2	−20.7
Liberal Democrats	Catherine Smith	1,722	21.7	+12.4
Labour	Asif Rabbani	1,578	19.9	+8.9
UKIP	Rhian Vaughan	256	3.2	−0.5
Majority		2,655	33.5	−31.4
Turnout		7,933		
Conservative hold		Swing		

Blunsdon
Party	Candidate	Votes	%	±%
Conservative	Gloria Dart	1,246	62.3	−21.4
Liberal Democrats	Joan Mortimer	338	16.9	+16.9
Labour	Jamal Miah	291	14.6	−1.7
UKIP	Mark Patrick	124	6.2	+6.2
Majority		908	45.4	−21.9
Turnout		1,999		
Conservative hold		Swing		

Central
Party	Candidate	Votes	%	±%
Labour	Robert Wright	2,357	52.8	+8.7
Conservative	Kevin Leakey	1,155	25.9	−6.6
Liberal Democrats	Kathryn Spencer	673	15.1	+4.1
Green	Stephen Chadfield	136	3.0	+3.0
Independent	David Cox	84	1.9	−4.2
Independent	Karsten Evans	60	1.3	+1.3
Majority		1,202	26.9	+15.3
Turnout		4,465		
Labour hold		Swing		

Covingham and Nythe
Party	Candidate	Votes	%	±%
Conservative	Richard Hurley	2,228	44.5	−13.1
Labour	Jennifer Millin	1,548	30.9	+6.1
Liberal Democrats	Christopher Ward	824	16.5	+10.1
UKIP	Corinna Allen	409	8.2	−3.0
Majority		680	13.6	−29.2
Turnout		5,009		
Conservative hold		Swing		

Dorcan
Party	Candidate	Votes	%	±%
Conservative	Roderick Bluh	1,858	41.4	
Labour	Sarah Bush	1,398	31.2	
Liberal Democrats	Clive Hooper	634	14.1	
UKIP	Robert Sheppard	293	6.5	
BNP	Roger Hiett	222	4.9	
Green	David Miles	81	1.8	
Majority		460	10.3	
Turnout		4,486		
Conservative hold		Swing		

Eastcott
Party	Candidate	Votes	%	±%
Liberal Democrats	Dave Wood	2,139	45.8	−12.8
Labour	Mustafa Gulam	1,207	25.9	+8.0
Conservative	Valerie Butt	1,084	23.2	−0.3
Green	John Hughes	237	5.1	+5.1
Majority		932	20.0	−15.1
Turnout		4,667		
Liberal Democrats hold		Swing		

Freshbrook and Grange Park
Party	Candidate	Votes	%	±%
Conservative	Michael Bray	2,257	46.3	−14.1
Labour	Matthew Rhodes	1,330	27.3	+15.0
Liberal Democrats	Heidi Teague	1,290	26.5	−0.8
Majority		927	19.0	−14.1
Turnout		4,877		
Conservative hold		Swing		

Gorse Hill and Pinehurst
Party	Candidate	Votes	%	±%
Labour	Rochelle Russell	1,597	43.4	−1.2
Conservative	Jaki Fairbrother	1,034	28.1	−13.5
Liberal Democrats	Tracy Ockley	707	19.2	+5.3
BNP	Brian Freeman	342	9.3	+9.3
Majority		563	15.3	+12.3
Turnout		3,680		
Labour hold		Swing		

Haydon Wick
Party	Candidate	Votes	%	±%
Conservative	David Renard	2,681	49.8	−11.2
Labour	Joanna Felstead	1,409	26.2	+6.5
Liberal Democrats	Stephen Pike	1,033	19.2	+10.9
UKIP	Robin Tingey	265	4.9	−6.1
Majority		1,272	23.6	−17.7
Turnout		5,388		
Conservative hold		Swing		

Highworth
Party	Candidate	Votes	%	±%
Conservative	John Short	2,235	47.2	−15.1
Labour	Phillip Beaumont	1,301	27.5	+4.7
Liberal Democrats	Jennifer Shorten	974	20.6	+5.7
Green	Andrew Day	222	4.7	+4.7
Majority		934	19.7	−19.8
Turnout		4,732		
Conservative hold		Swing		

Moredon
Party	Candidate	Votes	%	±%
Conservative	David Wren	1,679	39.4	−15.0
Labour	Maureen Caton	1,485	34.8	+5.9
Liberal Democrats	George Ing	792	18.6	+13.2
BNP	Steven Fowler	310	7.3	+7.3
Majority		194	4.5	−21.0
Turnout		4,266		
Conservative hold		Swing		

Old Town and Lawn
Party	Candidate	Votes	%	±%
Conservative	Brian Mattock	3,144	49.4	−14.8
Liberal Democrats	Shirley Burnham	1,510	23.7	+6.6
Labour	Cindy Matthews	1,206	18.9	+5.9
Green	Meryl Grant	278	4.4	+4.4
UKIP	Noel Gardner	231	3.6	−2.0
Majority		1,634	25.7	−21.4
Turnout		6,369		
Conservative hold		Swing		

Parks
Party	Candidate	Votes	%	±%
Labour	Mark Dempsey	1,587	43.1	
Conservative	Graham Cherry	996	27.0	
Liberal Democrats	Kathleen McCarthy	539	14.6	
BNP	Reginald Bates	258	7.0	
UKIP	Terence Hayward	242	6.6	
Green	Jennifer Miles	62	1.7	
Majority		591	16.0	
Turnout		3,684		
Labour gain from Conservative		Swing		

Penhill
Party	Candidate	Votes	%	±%
Liberal Democrats	Andrew Harrison	898	39.5	+14.3
Labour	Laura Baker	782	34.4	−7.3
Conservative	Emma Carter	444	19.5	−0.5
BNP	Raymond Morris	152	6.7	−6.3
Majority		116	5.1	
Turnout		2,276		
Liberal Democrats gain from Independent		Swing		

Shaw and Nine Elms
Party	Candidate	Votes	%	±%
Conservative	Keith Williams	2,622	54.2	−16.3
Liberal Democrats	James Farr	1,142	23.6	+5.4
Labour	Carol Heavens	1,072	22.2	+10.8
Majority		1,480	30.6	−21.7
Turnout		4,836		
Conservative hold		Swing		

St Margaret
Party	Candidate	Votes	%	±%
Conservative	Mark Edwards	2,522	47.6	−11.6
Labour	Nigel Chalk	1,577	29.8	+6.9
Liberal Democrats	Lloyd James	1,194	22.6	+14.3
Majority		945	17.9	−18.4
Turnout		5,293		
Conservative hold		Swing		

St Philip
Party	Candidate	Votes	%	±%
Conservative	Janet Heenan	2,013	41.4	−11.3
Labour	Joseph Tray	1,962	40.3	+9.0
Liberal Democrats	Ann Richards	893	18.3	+11.7
Majority		51	1.0	−20.5
Turnout		4,868		
Conservative hold		Swing		

Western
Party	Candidate	Votes	%	±%
Labour	Kevin Small	2,275	43.4	−2.2
Conservative	Samantha Michael	1,619	30.9	−8.0
Liberal Democrats	Christopher Shepherd	911	17.4	+10.9
BNP	Glyn Hunt	437	8.3	+8.3
Majority		656	12.5	+5.8
Turnout		5,242		
Labour hold		Swing		

Wroughton and Chiseldon
Party	Candidate	Votes	%	±%
Conservative	Eric Shaw	3,054	52.1	−11.2
Labour	Sandra Parsons	1,440	24.6	+11.5
Liberal Democrats	Victor Godman	1,366	23.3	−0.3
Majority		1,614	27.5	−12.2
Turnout		5,860		
Conservative hold		Swing		
