= Socialist Alliance (England) =

Socialist Alliance logo

The Socialist Alliance was an electoral alliance of political parties in England from 1999 to 2005.

The alliance was formed in the 1990s by former Labour MP Dave Nellist of the Socialist Party, who chaired the alliance. They stood in the 1999 European Parliament election, including former Labour MEPs Ken Coates and Hugh Kerr. The 2000 London mayoral election campaign by Ken Livingstone after his Labour candidacy was blocked brought together activists as the London Socialist Alliance. Their London Assembly candidates received 3% of the vote, but the campaign drove national interest. By 2001 the alliance was supported by the Socialist Workers Party (SWP), Communist Party of Great Britain (Provisional Central Committee), the International Socialist Group, Workers Liberty, Workers Power, and Revolutionary Democratic Group, though the Socialist Labour Party refused to join. They were supported by left-wing representatives of the arts, comedians, lawyers, and trade unions. In February 2001, the alliance co-organised a week-long protest outside Parliament against sanctions on Iraq.

Former Labour NEC member Liz Davies joined during the 2001 election campaign. It stood 98 candidates in the 2001 general election, for which Ken Loach directed a party broadcast, polling around 500 votes or less than 2% on average. Candidates included China Miéville and national executive member Mike Marqusee co-wrote the manifesto. That September, the Green Party conference voted down a motion for a pact with the alliance. In 2002, Paul Foot came third for the alliance in the vote for the Mayor of Hackney. The same year, Nellist successfully defended his Sheffield City Council seat for the alliance.

The Socialist Party left the alliance in November 2001 after the SWP successfully changed the constitution from a federal system to One Member, One Vote. In 2003, the AWL and Workers Power also withdrew due to the SWP making concessions towards Islam and attempting a closer relationship with the Muslim Association of Britain.

Following the Iraq War of 2003, the SWP voted to dissolve the alliance and instead joining the Respect - The Unity Coalition. Nellist last stood for the Socialist Alliance in 2005.

== Members ==
- Alliance for Workers' Liberty (until 2003)
- Socialist Party (until 2001)
- Socialist Resistance
- Socialist Workers Party
- Workers Power (until 2003)

== See also ==
- Socialist Green Unity Coalition
- Welsh Socialist Alliance
