= South Marston =

Village in Wiltshire, England

Coordinates: 51.590°N 1.722°W

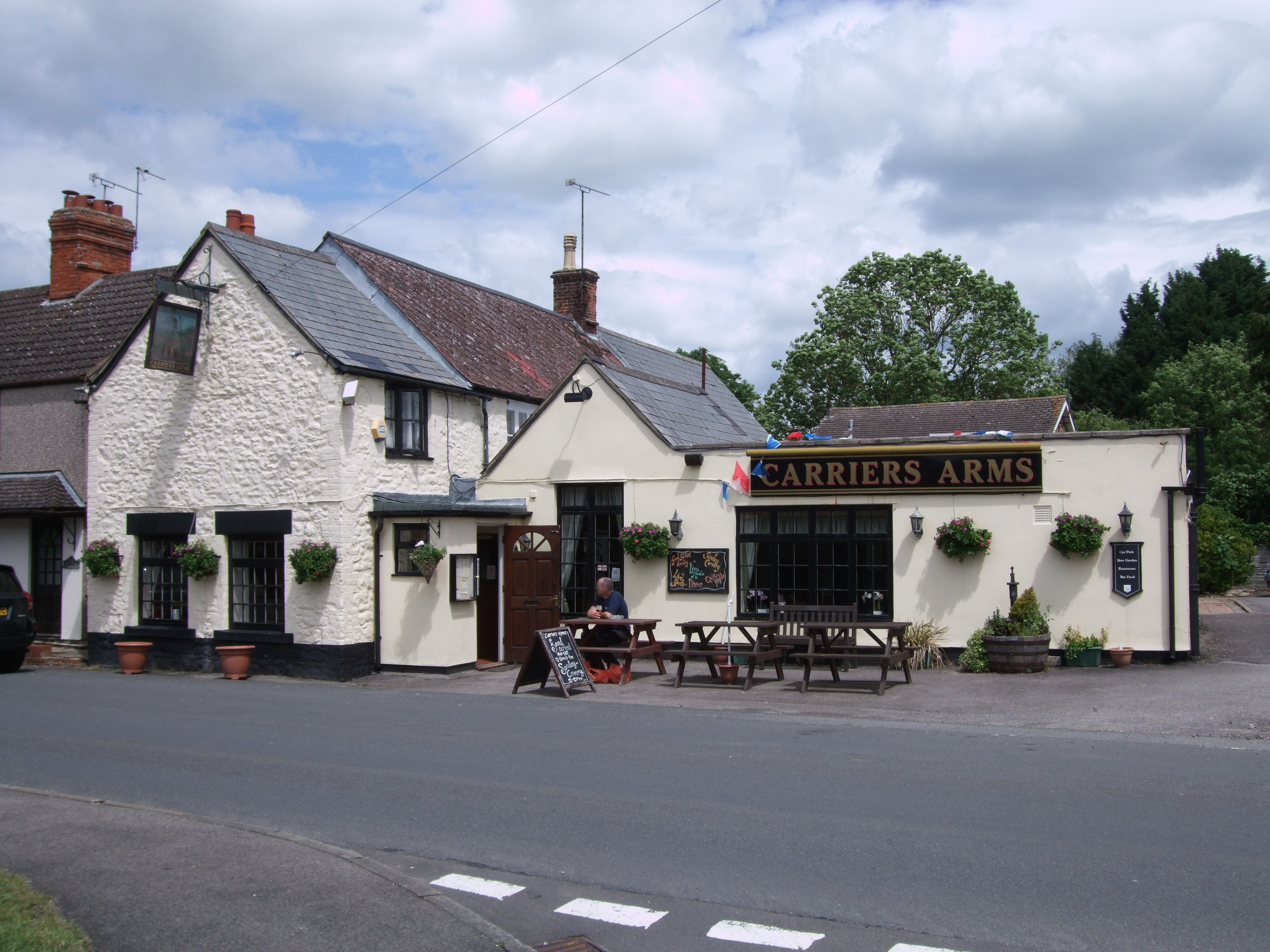
- The Carrier's Arms in 2012

- Location within Wiltshire
- Population: 860 (in 2021)
- OS grid reference: SU194879
- Civil parish: South Marston
- Unitary authority: Swindon
- Ceremonial county: Wiltshire
- Region: South West
- Country: England
- Sovereign state: United Kingdom
- Post town: Swindon
- Postcode district: SN3
- Dialling code: 01793
- Police: Wiltshire
- Fire: Dorset and Wiltshire
- Ambulance: South Western
- UK Parliament: Swindon North
- Website: Parish Council

South Marston is a village and civil parish in the Borough of Swindon, Wiltshire, England. The village is about 3 miles (5 km) north-east of Swindon town centre.

== History ==
The earliest documentary evidence for continuous settlement dates from the 13th century, but there is fragmentary archaeological evidence of occupation as far back as the Bronze Age.

It is claimed that there were Roman remains just outside South Marston in a field belonging to Rowborough Farm, but these have long disappeared. Ermin Way, a major Roman road linking Silchester and Gloucester, passed close to the village on the south-west side, separating it from Stratton St Margaret. There was a Roman station at Durocornovium, now Covingham, one mile south of the village.

The name "Marston" derives from a common Old English toponym meaning "marsh farm". This suggests that the village was founded before the Norman Conquest of England in 1066, although it is not recorded in the Domesday Book of 1086. Documentary evidence of the village exists from about 1280, when it is mentioned as part of Highworth Hundred. South Marston became a civil parish in 1894.

Alfred Bell bought the manor, farms and houses from the Earl of Carnarvon and others in the 1850s. He and his descendants rebuilt the manor house, built the school and repaired and refurbished the church. The manor house was demolished in the 1980s and replaced by a housing development.

== Parish church ==
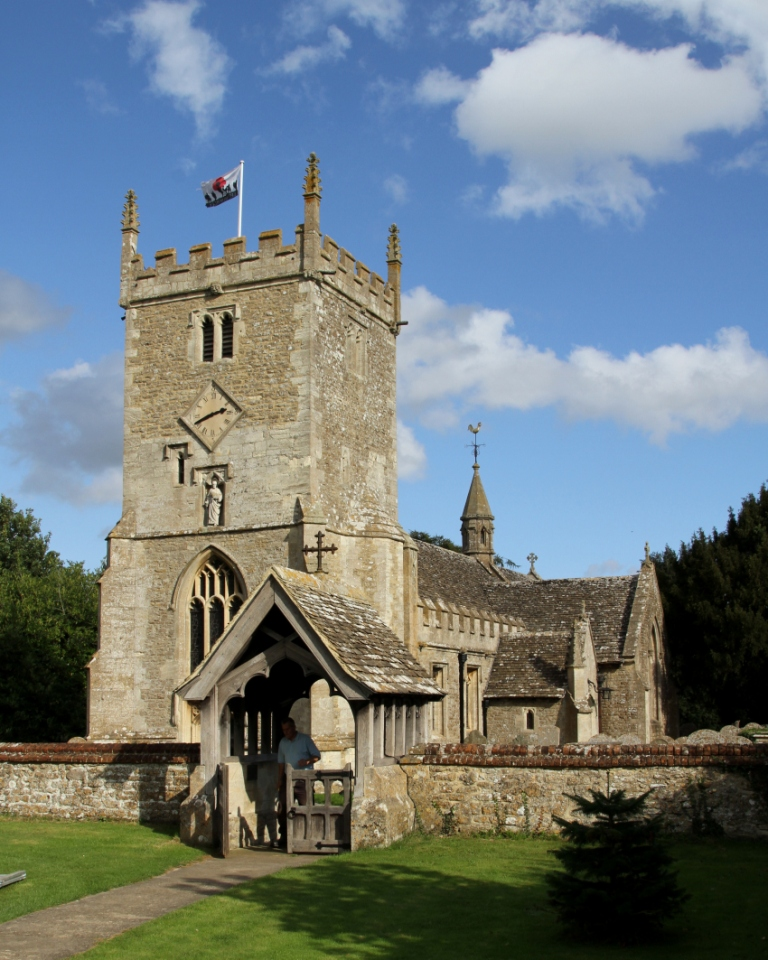
Church of St Mary Magdalene

The small Church of England parish church is dedicated to St Mary Magdalen. There is evidence of a Norman church in the simple north and south doorways; the plain font is also Norman. The present church, built in stone rubble with ashlar quoins and dressings, has a 13th-century chancel and 15th-century nave and west tower. The building was designated as Grade I listed in 1955.

Inside the church are several 18th-century monuments. Extensive restoration by the London architect John Belcher in 1886 included the addition of the south chapel and the small octagonal turret, with spire, above the east end of the nave; he also replaced the nave roof and the furnishings. The work was paid for by the Bell family, who bought the manor and village in the 1850s.

There is stained glass by Clayton and Bell, from 1886 and later. One of the six bells was cast by John Wallis in 1616; the others are from 1926.

South Marston was anciently a chapelry of Highworth, until it was made a parish in 1889. The benefice was united with that of Stanton Fitzwarren in 1955, and the incumbent was to live in South Marston parsonage house. Today, these parishes are covered by the Stratton team ministry, together with Stratton St Margaret.

== Politics ==
South Marston is part of St Margaret and South Marston ward which elects three councillors to Swindon Borough Council.

== Industries ==
Early in the Second World War, a Ministry of Aircraft Production shadow factory and airfield were built for Phillips & Powis Aircraft Ltd, and 1,090 Miles Master training aircraft were built there. Short Brothers Ltd also used another part of the airfield for final assembly and testing of locally-built Short Stirling bombers. Vickers-Armstrongs-Supermarine acquired the site in 1945 and produced Supermarine aircraft including Spitfire, Seafire, Attacker, Swift and Scimitar there until 1961; the factory continued to produce components for Vickers until the early 1980s.

In 1985, Honda bought the site, which straddles the boundary with Stratton St Margaret parish, and turned it over to car manufacture. It was the company's sole British plant and employed 3,500 in 2019 when Honda announced that it would close in 2021. In that year the site was sold to Panattoni, an American industrial real estate developer, who intended to use it for a large-scale logistics operation. Demolition of the car plant began in March 2024. The replacement buildings, to be called Panattoni Park, were to be built in stages over the next five or six years and cover around 5.5 million square feet.

The principal book storage facility for Oxford's Bodleian Libraries has been on South Marston Industrial Estate since 2010.

== Sport ==
Teams at the Vickers-Armstrongs works included a football team and a rugby team, who continue today under altered names: Swindon Supermarine F.C. and Supermarine RFC. Since the 1980s they have shared facilities at Hunts Copse just north of South Marston, alongside other sports, a bowls club and the Supermarine Sports & Social Club.

== Notable resident ==
Alfred Williams, poet and steam-hammer operator at Swindon Railway Works, died in South Marston on 10 April 1930 aged 52.
