= Stratton St Margaret =

Civil parish in Wiltshire, England

Coordinates: 51.586°N 1.762°W

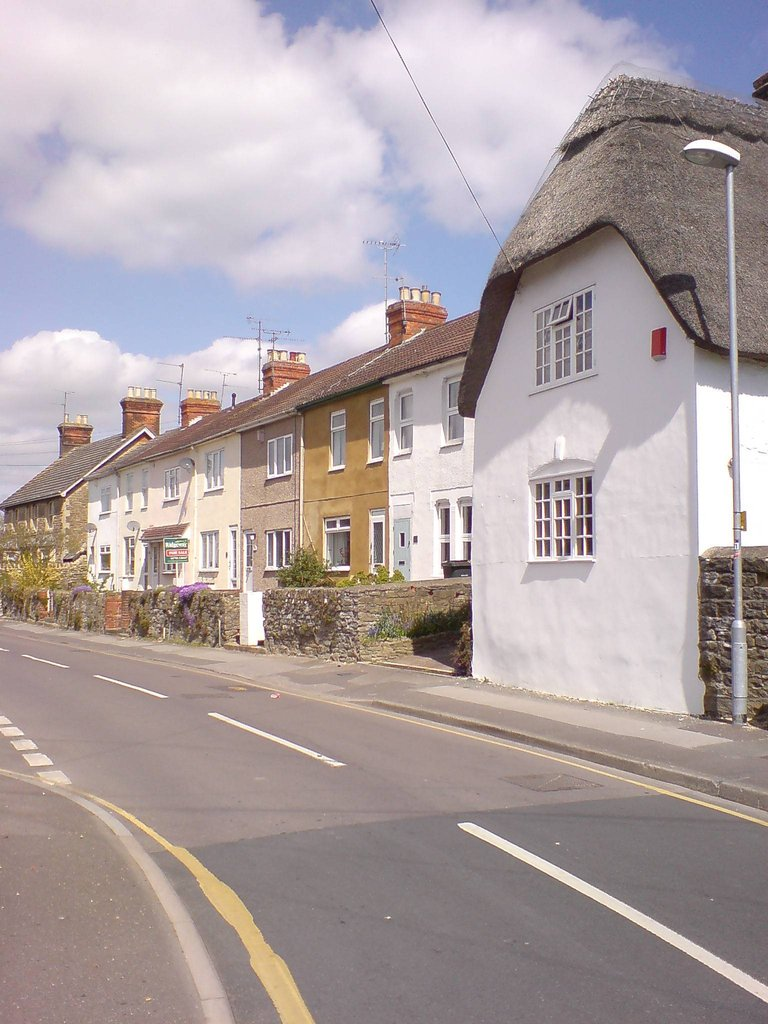
- Green Road, Stratton St Margaret

- Location within Wiltshire
- Population: 21,005 (in 2021)
- OS grid reference: SU166875
- Civil parish: Stratton St Margaret
- Unitary authority: Swindon
- Ceremonial county: Wiltshire
- Region: South West
- Country: England
- Sovereign state: United Kingdom
- Post town: SWINDON
- Postcode district: SN2, SN3
- Dialling code: 01793
- Police: Wiltshire
- Fire: Dorset and Wiltshire
- Ambulance: South Western
- UK Parliament: Swindon North
- Website: Parish Council

Stratton St Margaret is a civil parish in the Borough of Swindon, Wiltshire, England. The parish covers north-eastern suburbs of Swindon including Stratton St Margaret itself, along with Upper Stratton, Lower Stratton and Kingsdown.

== Geography ==
Stratton St Margaret, once a distinct village, has now become the northeastern part of Swindon and is rapidly becoming suburbanised. The area of the parish was originally much larger than it is now. Most of Gorse Hill was part of the parish until it was transferred to Swindon in 1890, and a large part of the Penhill housing estate was once fields to the north of Stratton St. Margaret. In the south, Nythe was separated from Stratton St. Margaret in 2015 and now forms part of Nythe, Eldene and Liden parish.

== History ==
Stratton derives its name from the Latin strata ("paved way" or "street") after the former Roman road whose course traverses the parish from northwest to southeast. The Domesday Book of 1086 records the toponym Stratone, when the parish was held by Nigel, physician to William the Conqueror. The village consisted of three hamlets: The Street; the area around Green Road and Dores Road and including the few houses at Kingsdown; and Stratton Green, mainly around Tilleys Lane. Footpaths and coffin-ways joined the hamlets. In 1316 Queen Margaret had Upper and Lower Stratton in dower, and began the association. In 1445 it is mentioned as "Margrete Stratton". In Saxon times it was a market town and had a fair.

Walter de Merton, Bishop of Rochester had a rectorship here and bought the manor which he presented to Merton College, Oxford who retained an interest until recent times. A priory here was confiscated by Henry VI and presented to King's College, Cambridge.

Highworth & Swindon Workhouse was built within the parish from 1834, having been relocated from Highworth. The hospital was built in 1852. In the 1881 Census, Charles Marlow, jockey of 1849 Derby winner 'Flying Dutchman', is recorded as living in the workhouse.

In the past, the people of Stratton were commonly known as 'crocodiles'. The name came from a local story that some Stratton men once armed themselves against a supposed crocodile found at the side of a road. It turned out to be a scarf.

== Governance ==
Stratton St Margaret Parish Council is the first tier of local government. Almost all of the parish, together with South Marston parish, are part of the St Margaret and South Marston ward which elects three members of Swindon Borough Council. The exception is a residential area in the south of the parish, around Colebrook Junior School and close to Nythe, which is in Covingham and Dorcan ward. The Penhill and Upper Stratton ward is in the area.

For Westminster elections the parish is within the Swindon North constituency, except for the same southern area which is part of Swindon South.

== Religious sites ==
=== Parish church ===
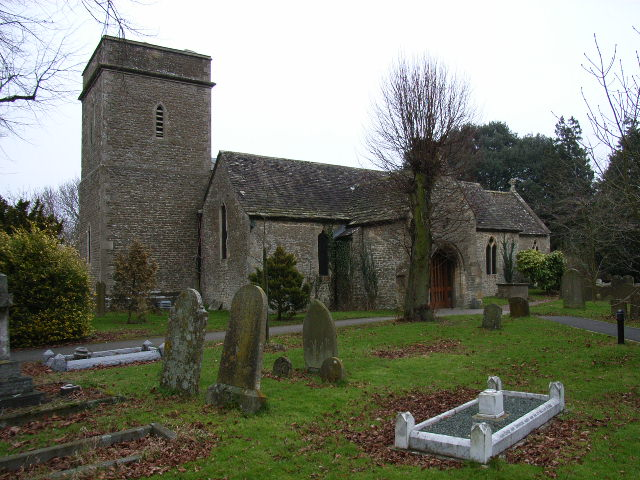
Church of St Margaret

St Margaret's parish church is from the late 13th century, although an earlier Norman doorway has been repositioned at the north entrance. The north wall of the nave has an early 14th-century tomb recess under ogee arches, the carving called "vigorously crude" by Orbach. The west tower – low, plain and unbuttressed – is from the 13th or 14th century and was partly rebuilt in 1845–1846 during restoration of the church by Anthony Salvin.

Vestries were built onto the north side of the chancel, forming an extension of the north aisle, by C.E. Ponting in 1896. In 1949 the chapel at the east end of the south aisle was refurbished as a war memorial and dedicated to St Catherine of Alexandria. The church was designated as Grade I listed in 1955.

Monuments inside the church include one in marble and alabaster, made around 1670 in memory of Catherine Hedges (died 1649) and attributed to the London sculptor Joshua Marshall. Stained glass in the chancel was made by Heaton, Butler and Bayne in the 1860s. There were three bells in 1553, and over the years they have been increased to a ring of eight; the oldest is dated 1669.

One chest tomb in the churchyard is Grade II listed: that of Susanah Nicholas Van Acker (died in childbirth, 1683) and her husband William Hedges (1632–1701), a merchant who was appointed by the East India Company as governor of Bengal from 1681 to 1683; in later life he was an alderman of London and a director of the Bank of England.

At some point the parish was united with that of South Marston. Today, the parish is in the area of the Stratton Team Ministry, alongside South Marston and Stanton Fitzwarren.

=== St Philip's ===
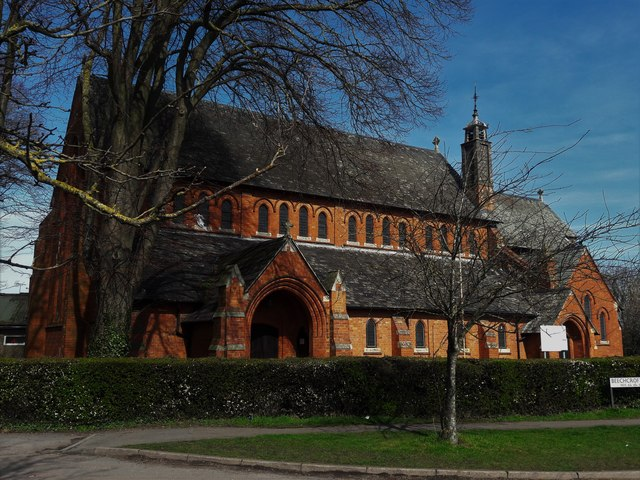
St Philip's Church, Upper Stratton

The church of St Philip the Deacon was built on Beechcroft Road in Upper Stratton as a chapel of ease. The redbrick building was begun in 1904 and completed in 1911. Orbach writes: "The interior has grandeur, soaring brick and simple roofs". A district was carved out for it in 1932 and the church continues as a self-contained parish.

=== Methodists ===
Stratton Methodist Church was built in 1883 on Ermin Street. In red brick with ornamental stone dressings, its style is called Lombardic by Orbach. This building replaced a Primitive Methodist chapel at Lower Stratton, erected in 1830, enlarged in 1856, then turned into a pair of dwellings.

== Notable people ==
- Adam de Stratton (died c. 1294) was the son of Thomas de Argoges, or Arwillis, of Stratton St Margaret. His fortune, however, came from moneylending, during the reign of Henry III. His brother Henry de Stratton was a judge in Ireland.
- John Eatwell, Baron Eatwell (born 1945).
- Reverend Carol Stone (1954–2014), the United Kingdom's first transgender vicar, served as priest and chaplain of St Philip's Church, Upper Stratton, from 1996 until 2014.

== Economy ==
Until the early 20th century, employment mainly consisted of agriculture, brewing and shopkeeping. Early in the Second World War a shadow aircraft factory was built on land straddling the boundary with South Marston parish, at first producing the Miles Master trainer, and later assembling Short Stirling bombers and building some Spitfires. Vickers-Armstrongs bought the factory in 1945 and continued building aircraft until 1961, and components until the early 1980s. Honda bought the site in 1985 and turned it over to car manufacture. It was the company's sole British plant and employed 3,500 in 2019 when Honda announced that it would close in 2021. In that year the site was sold to Panattoni, an American industrial real estate developer, who intended to use it for a large-scale logistics operation.

There was a bacon factory where Greenbridge is now. Pressed Steel built their car plant in 1955, now owned by BMW and building parts for the Mini. In 2010 DHL opened a large distribution centre next to the A419.
