= Honda UK Manufacturing =

British automotive manufacturing company

Coordinates: 51.587204°N 1.737511°W

Honda United Kingdom Manufacturing Ltd.
- Type: Subsidiary (Private limited company)
- Industry: Automotive
- Founded: 1985
- Defunct: 30 July 2021
- Headquarters: Swindon, Wiltshire, United Kingdom
- Key people: David Hodgetts (Managing Director, Honda UK); Jason Smith (Director, Honda UK Manufacturing)
- Products: Automobiles, engines
- Number of employees: approx. 3,400
- Parent: Honda Motor Co., Ltd (1985 – March 2021); Panattoni (March–July 2021)
- Website: www.hondamanufacturing.co.uk

Honda of the UK Manufacturing Ltd (informally HUM) was a British automotive manufacturing company, and the United Kingdom-based manufacturing subsidiary of the multinational automotive company Honda. Established in 1985 and headquartered in Swindon, England, HUM operated manufacturing plants that included casting, engine assembly, pressing, welding, painting, and car assembly activities. At the time of its closure in 2021, it employed around 3,400 people at the plants, which occupied a site covering around 370 acres.

By 2009, Honda had invested almost £1.4 billion in the Swindon plants. In 2008, they produced 230,423 cars. In 2016, annual unit production was down to 134,146 units. In early 2019, it was announced the entire manufacturing plant in Swindon would close. The plant closed on 30 July 2021, ending over 36 years of Honda production in Europe.

== Honda in the United Kingdom ==
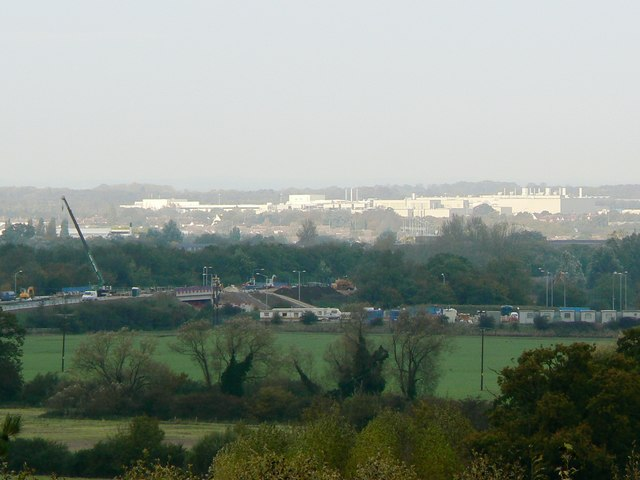
Distant view of the plant in 2006

Having gained ground in the United Kingdom with its popular range of motorcycles during the 1960s, Honda first imported cars to the United Kingdom in 1966 with a 600cc 2-seater sport car, followed by 600cc 4-seater car. In 1972, the original Civic was launched, going on sale at a time when Japanese-built cars (particularly Nissan's range of Datsun-badged models) were enjoying a surge in sales. The larger Accord joined the range in 1976, followed by the Prelude coupe in 1979.

In 1980, Honda entered a venture with British Leyland in order to build Honda-based designs in BL factories. The first product of this venture was the 1981 Triumph Acclaim, which was produced for three years until it was replaced by the Rover 200 Series; both cars were based on the Honda Ballade.

In the meantime, the two companies worked together on "Project XX", first announced in 1980 as a new medium-sized luxury saloon due for a mid-1980s launch. This evolved into the Rover 800 Series, launched in 1986, and based on the Japan-built Honda Legend.

Around the same time, Honda agreed for BL/Austin Rover to build versions for the UK of its Ballade saloon alongside the Rover 200 Series at Longbridge. The Ballade's successor, the Concerto, was also built at Longbridge, and was based on the second generation Rover 200 Series.

== Swindon plant ==
In 1985, Honda acquired the South Marston site on the northeastern outskirts of Swindon. The site had been used during the Second World War for aircraft production by Phillips & Powis and Short Brothers, and later by Vickers-Armstrongs-Supermarine; its selection in 1938 took into account the presence of the skilled workforce at the Swindon Works of the Great Western Railway. The 370-acre (150 ha) site straddles the boundary between the parishes of Stratton St Margaret and South Marston.

HUM was established in 1985, and began engine production in 1989. In 1992, production of the Accord (which had the same design as the Rover 600 Series, but used different engines) began in Swindon, while a second engine line was added. In 1994, production of the Civic began in Swindon. Also that year, the Rover-Honda venture ended due to BMW's takeover of Rover. Despite this, the 1995 Rover 400 Series was based on the new Civic.

In August 2000, it was reported that UK-made Honda cars would be exported to Japan for the first time. In the same year, the plant began production of the CR-V SUV, which had been sold since 1997 in the UK. In September 2001, HUM opened a second car assembly plant at Swindon, adding two hundred jobs and increasing capacity to 250,000 vehicles a year. From this year onward, production of the Civic Type R moved to Swindon, and would remain there for the rest of the plant's life. In December, plant workers voted to form a union, and be represented by the Amalgamated Engineering and Electrical Union.

In 2002, HUM began export to North America. At the same time, production of the Accord ended, with the new model being imported from Japan. In October 2002, HUM managing director Ken Keir stated that Honda would maintain vehicle production in the United Kingdom, irrespective of whether or not it joined the Eurozone. In 2003, the plant produced its one millionth vehicle.

In September 2006, it was announced that Honda would be recruiting an additional 700 workers for HUM, and raising production at the site by 32% to 250,000 vehicles per year. In February 2008, it was announced that Honda would be making an £80 million investment in new production facilities at Swindon, for the manufacture of plastic car parts and metal castings for engines. That year, the plant produced its two millionth vehicle.

On 30 January 2009, due to the recession, which had caused a fall in sales, it was announced that direct workers at the Swindon site would be laid off for four months until 1 June, with full pay for the first two months and about half-pay for the remainder. Employees in the indirect staff or maintenance categories would instead lose approximately £1,500 and remain at work.

In October 2009, HUM began production of the Jazz, which until then had been imported from Japan. The Jazz continued production in Swindon until 2014, when the new generation brought the model back to being imported from Japan.

In September 2012, Honda announced a £267 million investment programme at the Swindon site, to support the introduction of new models of the Civic and CR-V, and a new 1.6 litre diesel engine. The investment would take total investment at the site to over £1.5 billion, and would increase the workforce to 3,500.

In 2015, Honda planned to invest £200 million to turn Swindon into the global production hub of the next generation of the Civic five-door hatchback, providing about half of its production for export markets. It would bring cumulative investment in the plant to over £2.2 billion. As part of the plan, the plant would stop production of the CR-V. In 2018, production of the CR-V ended, with a total of 1,209,174 units produced at the facility.

The trade deal between Japan and the European Union, agreed in July 2017 and signed off in July 2018, put an end to import tariffs on car imports between the two economic zones. These had formed a significant part of the rationale for building the plant in 1985; what were termed by government as "Brexit uncertainties" after the 2016 referendum contributed further to doubt about the future of the plant. In February 2019, Honda announced that the plant would close in 2021, with the loss of about 3,500 jobs in the area, and production shifting to Japan, North America and China. Honda stated that the industry's transition to electrified cars (including pure-electric, plug-in hybrid and "self-charging" hybrids) was behind the closure, as it made less business sense to retool the Swindon plant due to its small production volume relative to North American and Asian plants. The plant was said to be running at around half capacity, and it was already projected to close for six days in April 2019 as part of the company's Brexit preparations. In December 2020, production was halted temporarily as there was a delay in parts deliveries.

HUM officially ceased operations on 30 July 2021 with the final car produced, a Modern Steel Metallic Civic Sport hatchback to be exported to the USA, rolling off the line the previous day. On display during the final day of production was a unique Civic Type R with workers' signatures on the bonnet and doors, the name 'Honda of the UK Manufacturing' over the front-left wheel arch, and a Union Jack emblazoned on the back. The closure also marked the end of Honda manufacturing in Europe. Of Swindon's 3,400 workers, 200 remained to decommission the plant.

The site was bought by Panattoni, an American industrial real estate developer, who intended to use it for a large-scale logistics operation. Demolition of the car plant began in March 2024.

=== Cars manufactured at Honda Manufacturing UK ===
- Honda Civic (1994–2021)
- Honda Jazz (2009–2014)
- Honda Accord (1992–2002)
- Honda CR-V (2000–2018)
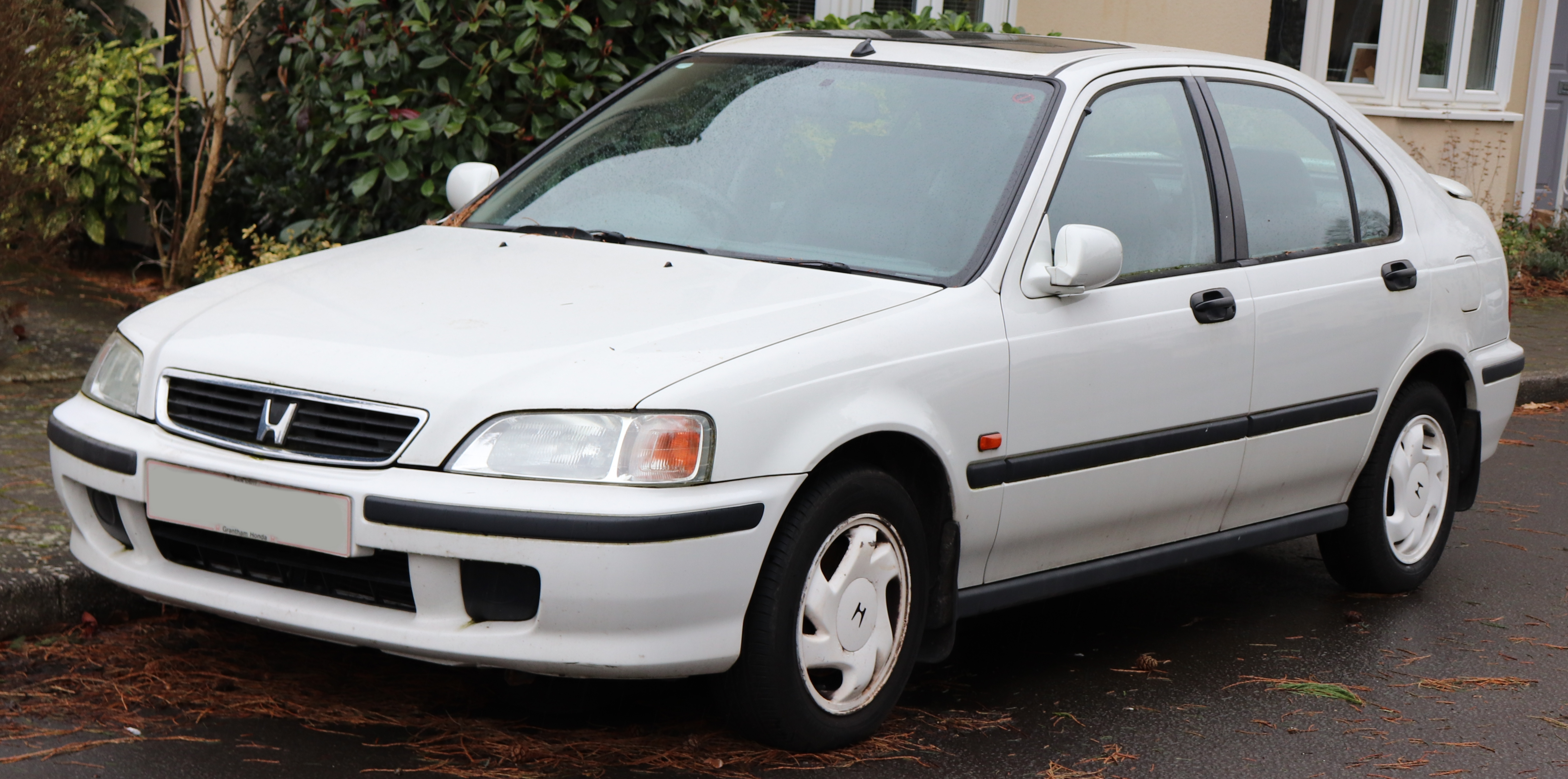
Honda Civic 6th gen

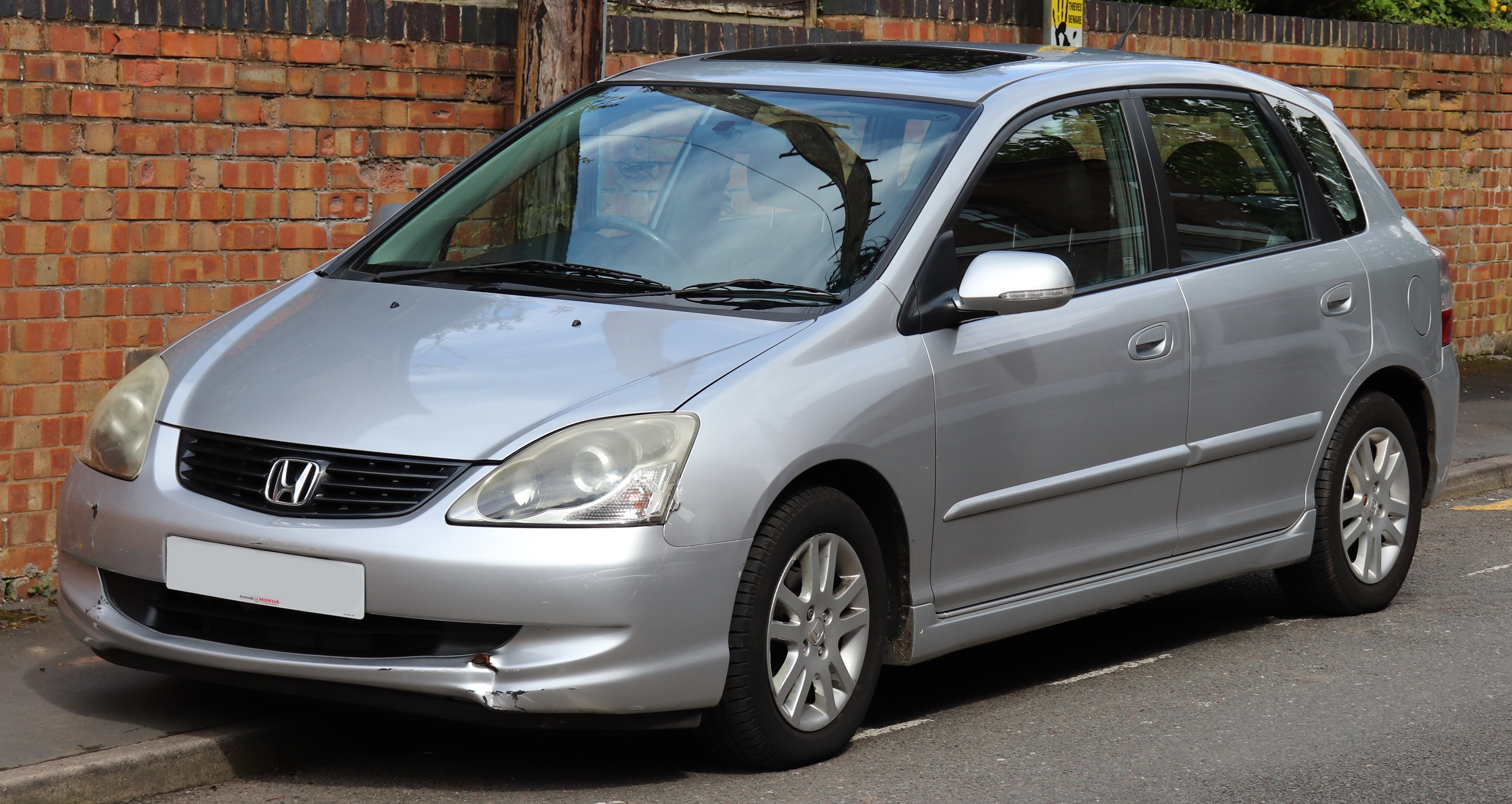
Honda Civic 7th gen

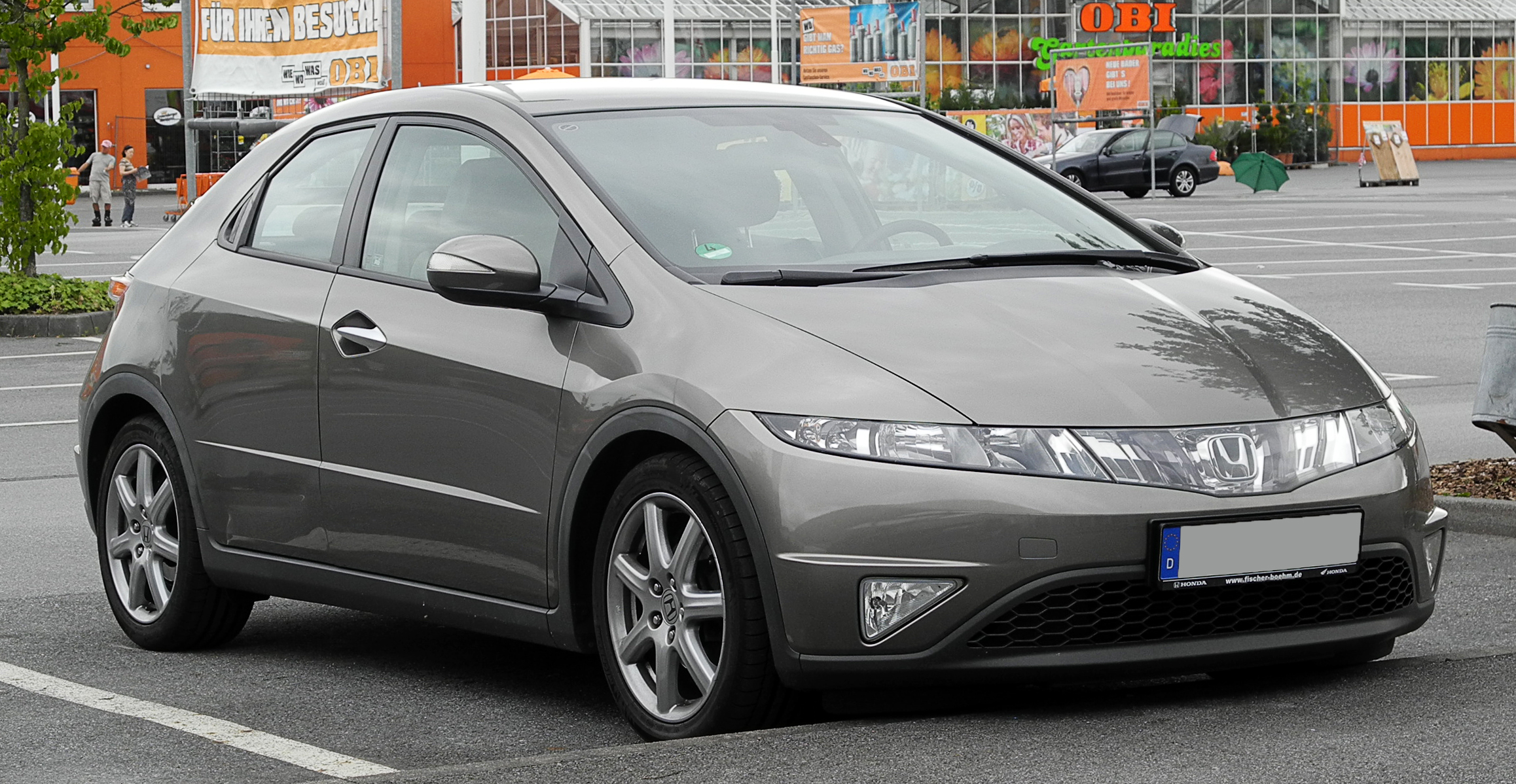
Honda Civic 8th gen

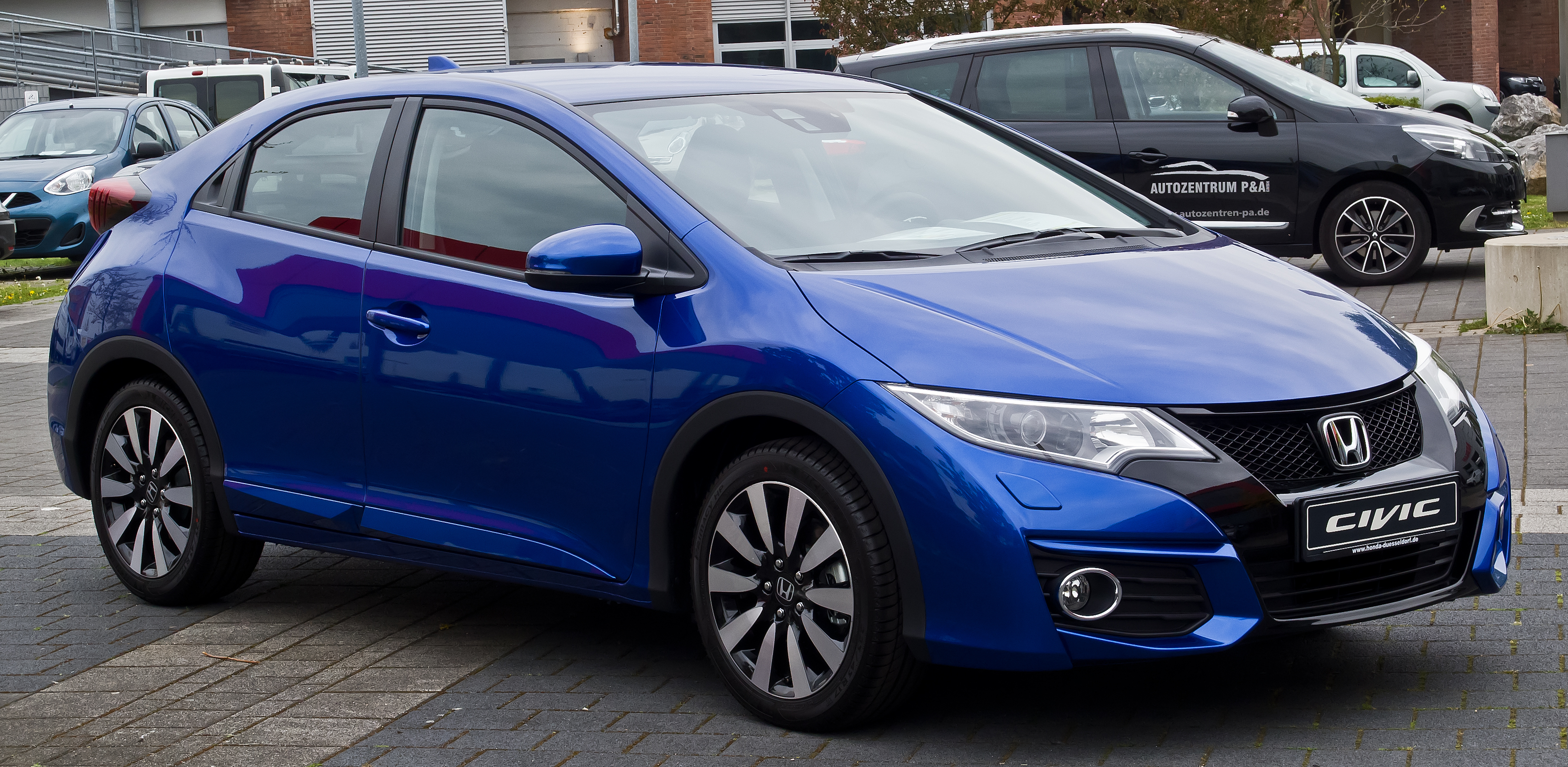
Honda Civic 9th gen

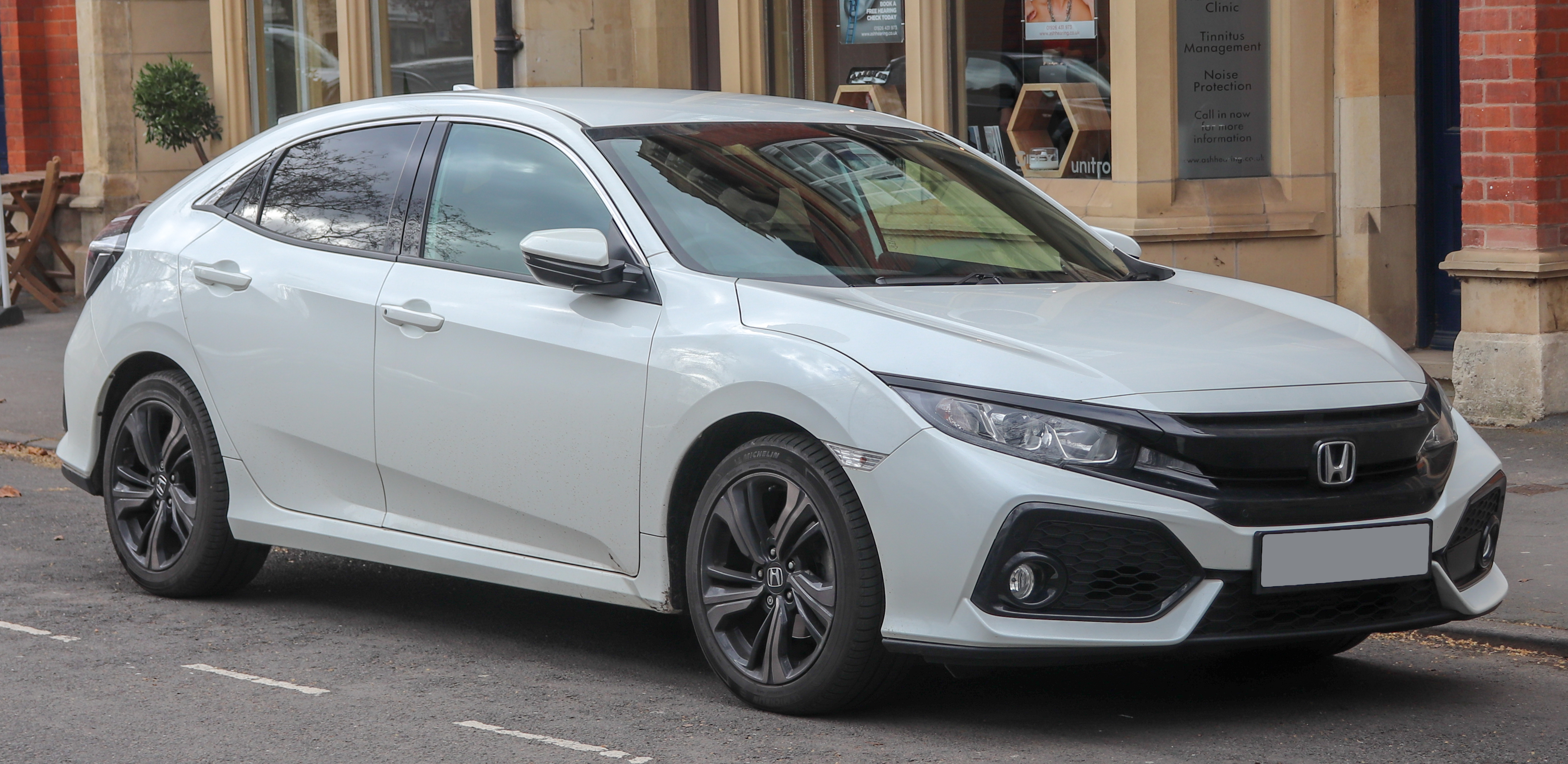
Honda Civic 10th gen

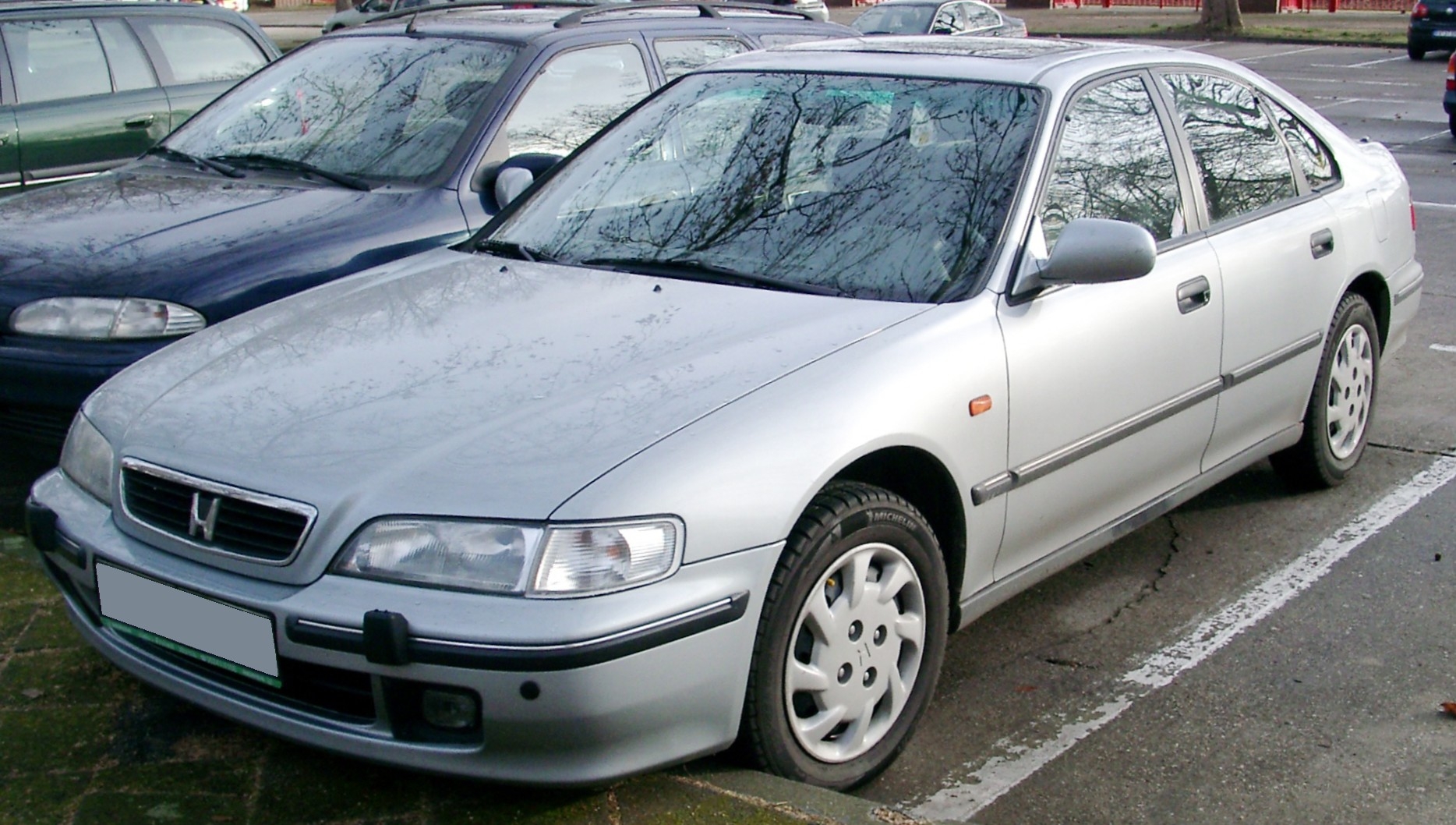
Honda Accord 5th gen

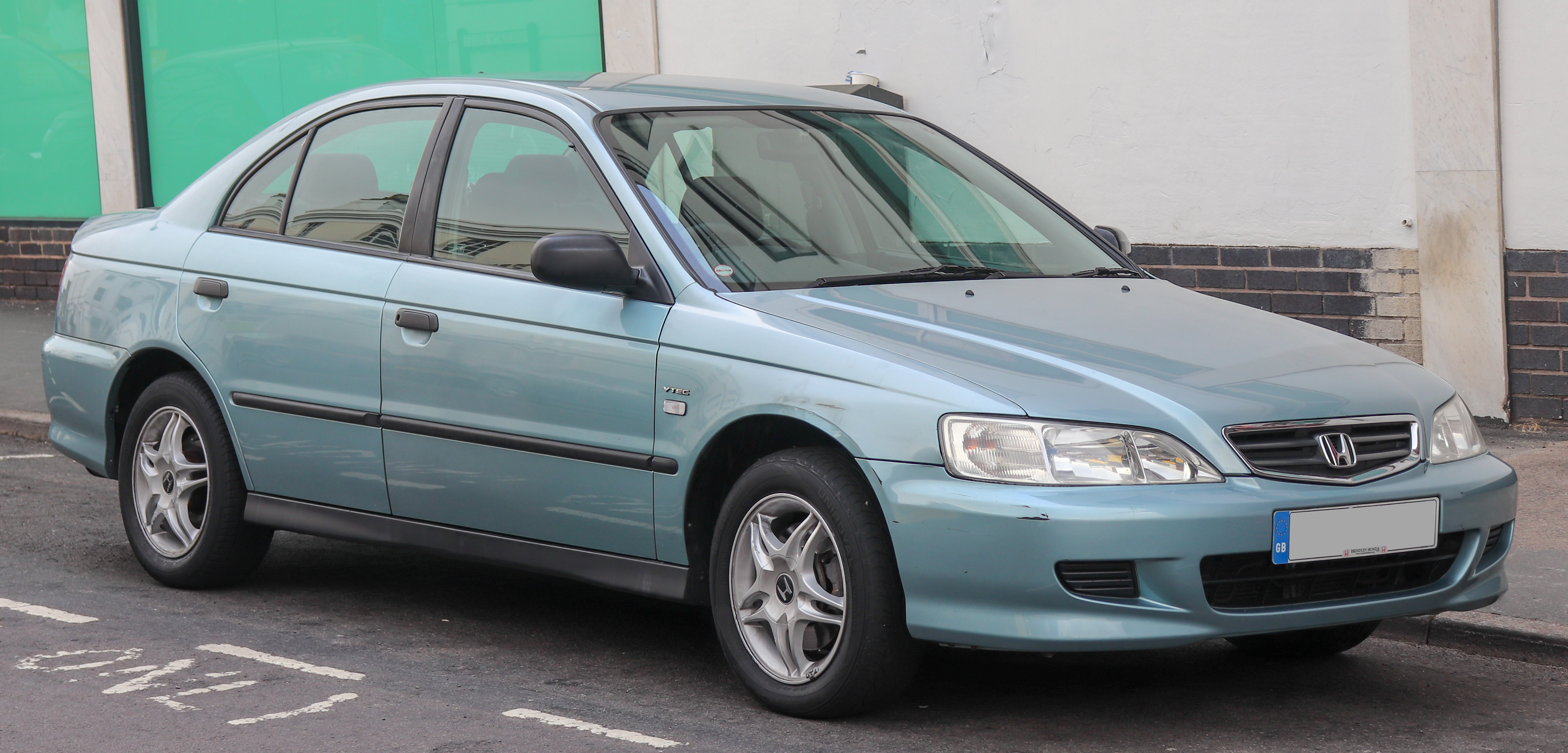
Honda Accord 6th gen

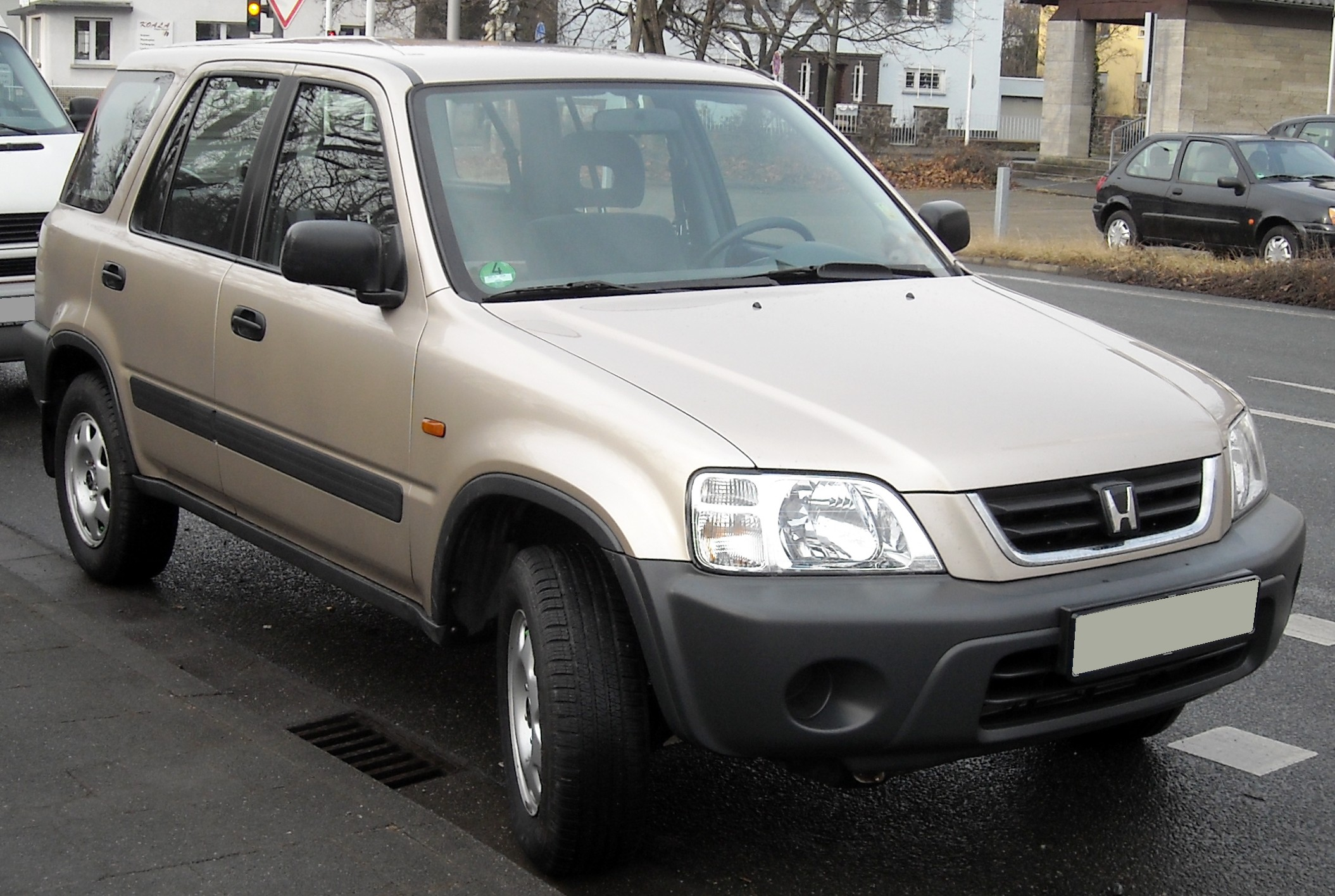
Honda CR-V 1st gen

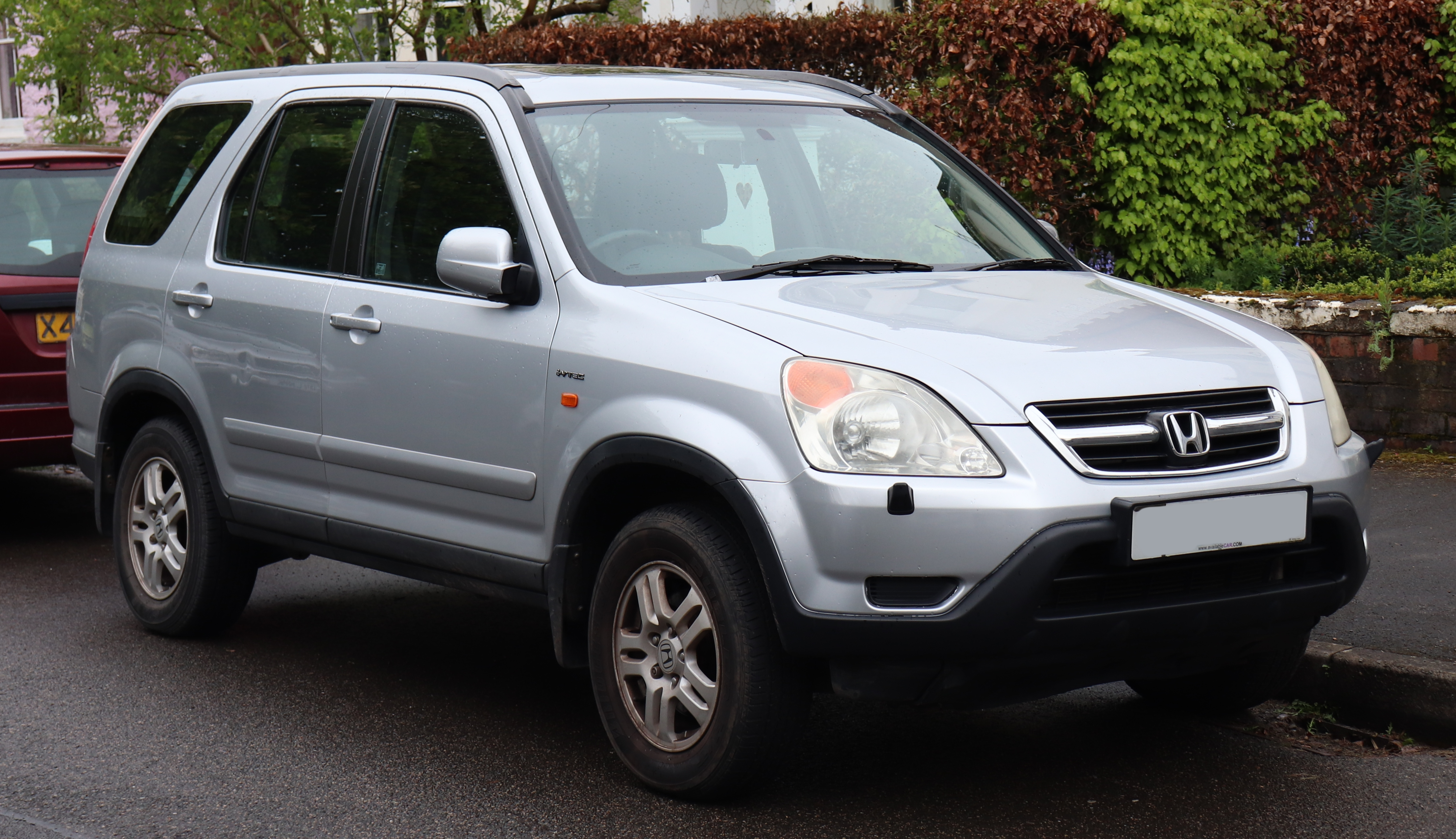
Honda CR-V 2nd gen

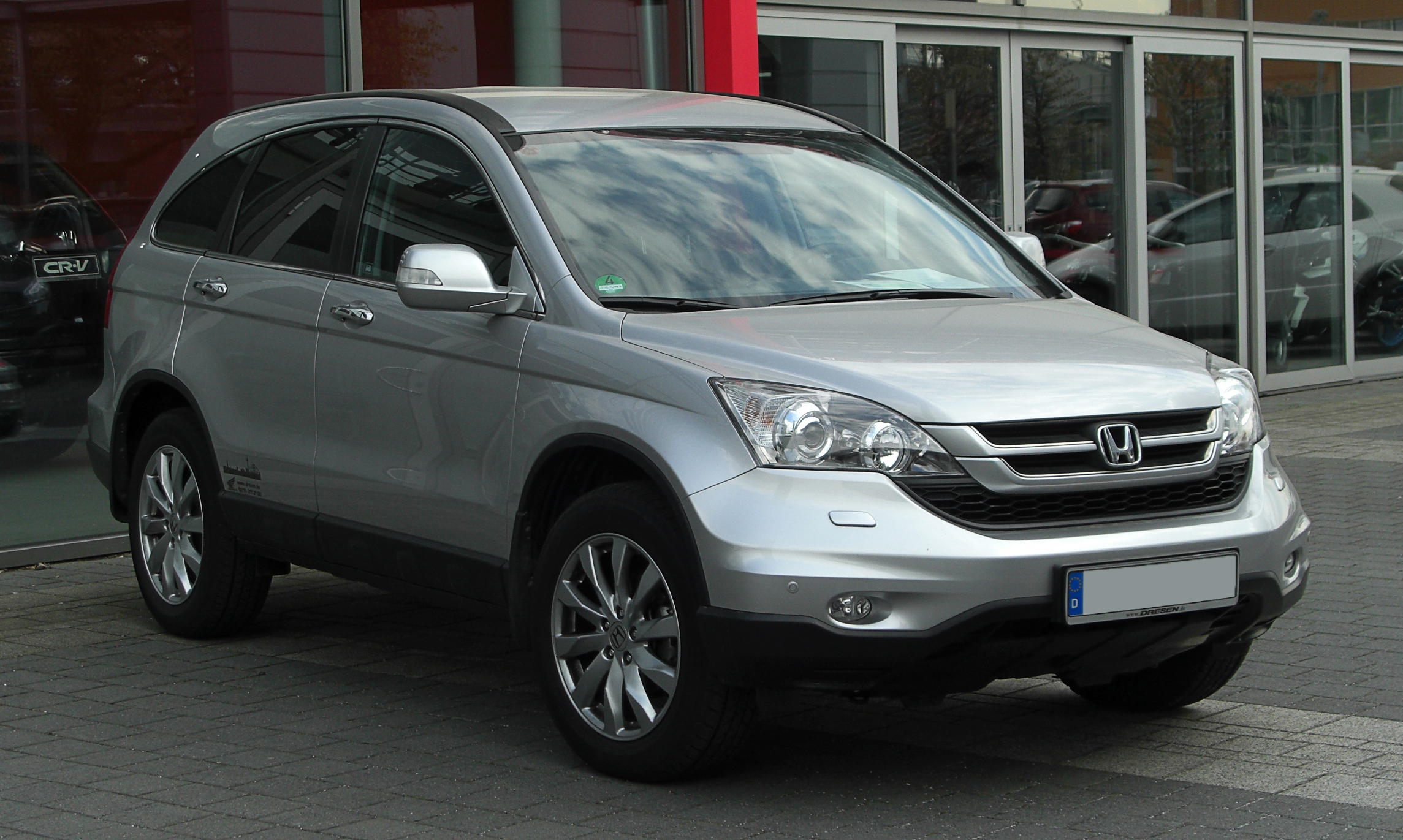
Honda CR-V 3rd gen

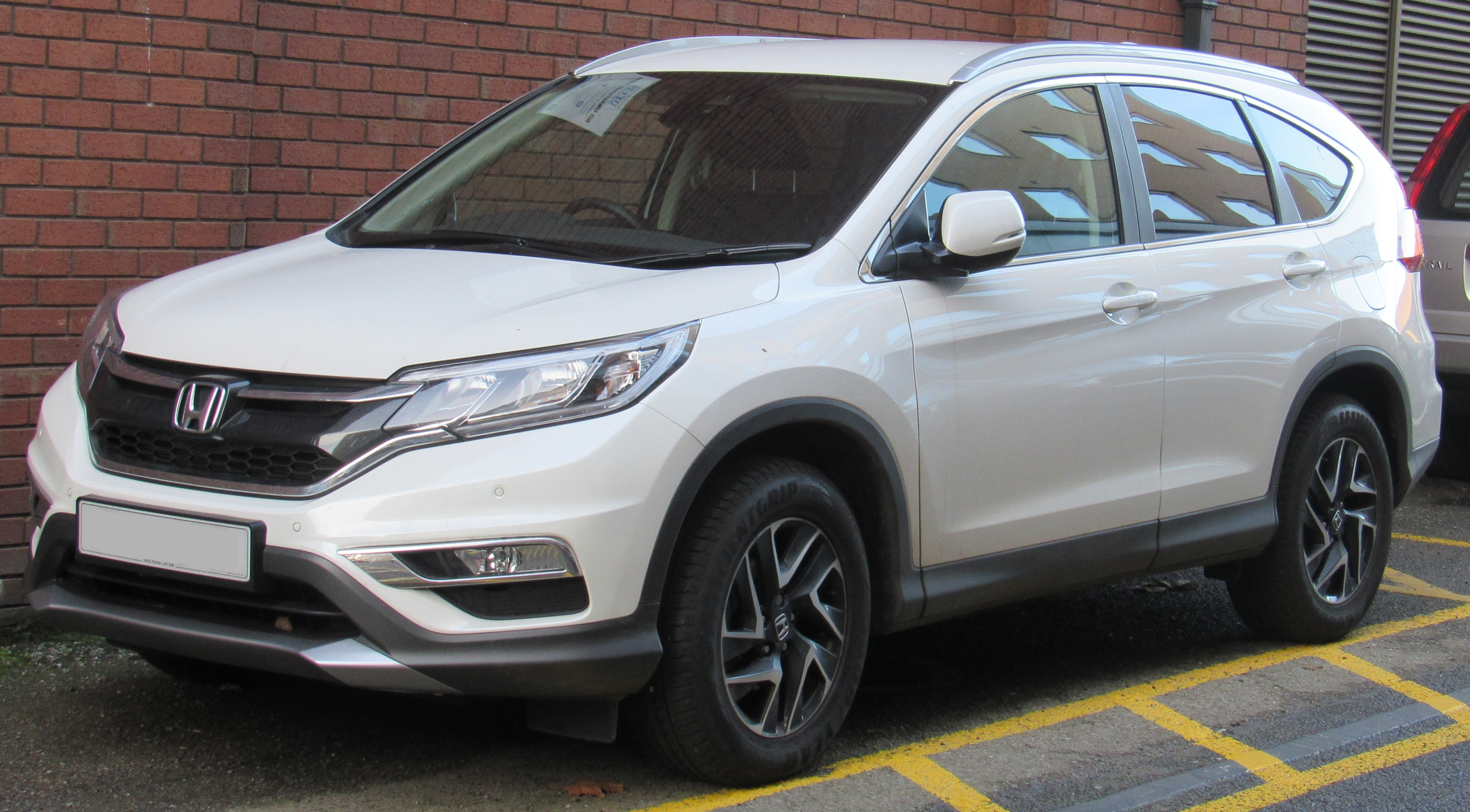
Honda CR-V 4th gen

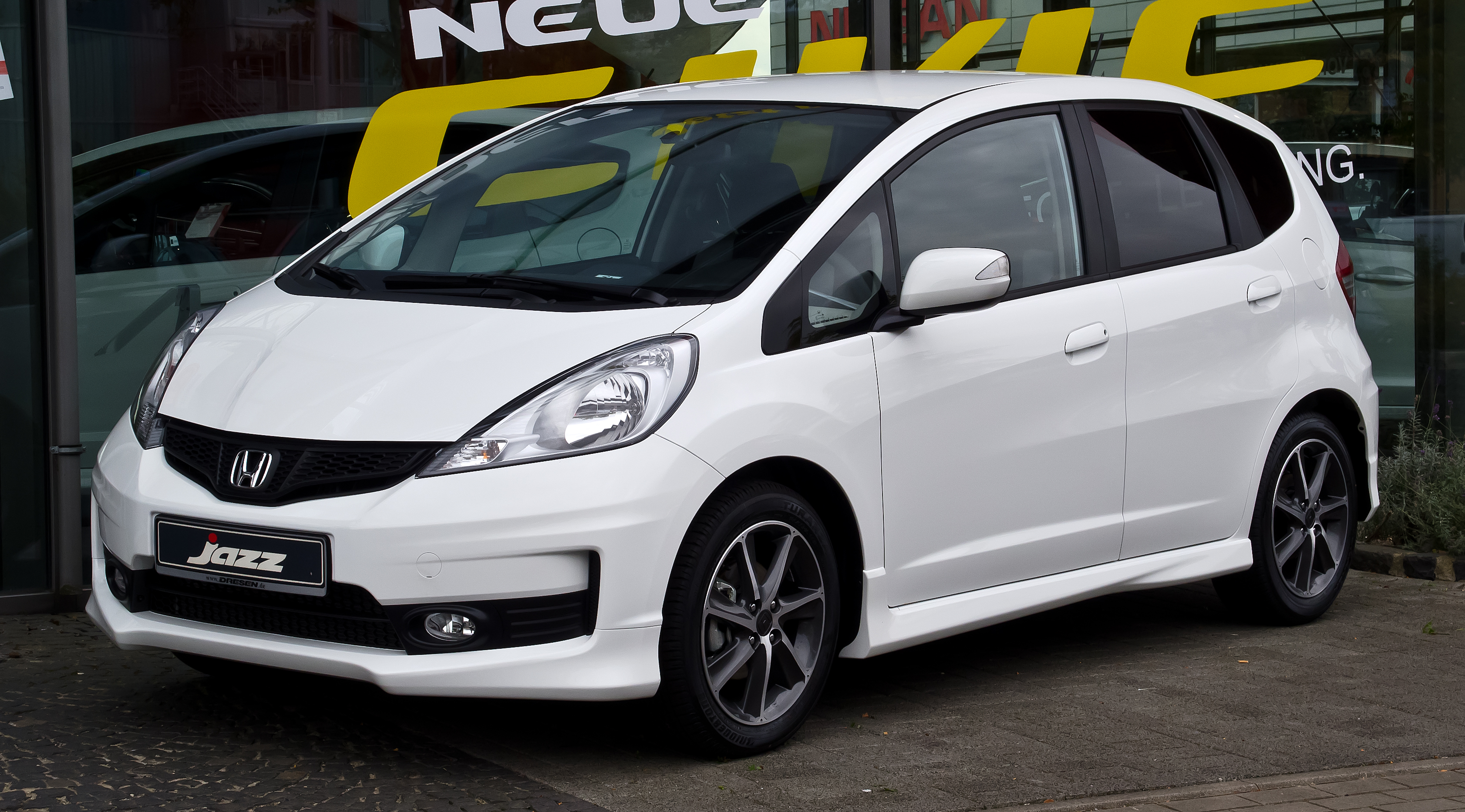
Honda Jazz 2nd gen (facelift)

=== Future of the Swindon site ===
Honda announced in March 2021 that the site had been sold to Panattoni, an American industrial real estate developer, who would use it for a large-scale logistics operation.

On 24 June 2022, the Honda Heritage Garden was opened on part of the site. It includes a public playground that commemorates Swindon's manufacturing history (trains, aircraft, cars), plus trees planted in memory of two workers who died in service.

== See also ==
- List of Honda assembly plants
- List of Honda facilities
