= Ralph de Brantingham =

English noble in the mid-fourteenth century

King's Chamberlain
- In office 31 January 1349 – 21 February 1365 (TAQ)
- Monarch: Edward III
- Preceded by: Thomas Crosse
- Succeeded by: William de Mulsho

Personal details
- Children: Thomasina

Ralph de Brantingham
- Children: Thomasina
- Offices held: Parson of Kirkby Thore; Prebendary of the collegiate church in South Malling; Parson of Medburn; Parson of Cherring

Ralph de Brantingham was an English noble of the mid-fourteenth century, who served as King's Chamberlain to Edward III.

== Political offices ==
De Brantingham was appointed King's Chamberlain on 31 January 1349 and admitted the following day, 1 February 1349. He was succeeded by William de Mulsho, who was himself appointed on 21 February 1365, which serves as a terminus ante quem for de Brantingham's reign. In any event, de Brantingham continued to serve as the king's clerk as late as 1366.

== Religious offices ==
Early in his career, on 27 February 1346, de Brantingham was presented to the church of Kirkby Thore in the diocese of Carlisle. De Brantingham also held a prebend of the collegiate church in South Malling and was parson of the church of Medburn in the diocese of Lincoln until 4 October 1366, when, by writ at Westminster, the king exchanged de Brantingham's benefices with that of Nicholas de Chaddesden, also the king's clerk - namely, the parsonage of the church of Cherryng in the diocese of Canterbury.

== Acquisition of land ==
By deed of 10 January 1348, Ralph de Neville, second Baron Neville de Raby and described in the deed as a gardener and farmer, granted de Brantingham two shops in the hamlet of Penrith, Cumbria.

=== Thomasina de Brantingham ===
De Brantingham's daughter, Thomasina, married Thomas de Salkok and bore him two sons, Thomas and John. Thomasina de Salcock adopted the Sawcock coat of arms, three cocks, and used a seal bearing a cock in 1387 on a document found at Arncliff Hall in Arncliffe, North Yorkshire.

After Thomas de Salkok senior died, de Brantingham granted Thomasina, for her life, the manor of Salkok, in return for payment to the grantor, during his life, of 100 shillings at Whitsuntide and Martinmas. The remainders in tail were granted to Thomasina's sons, Thomas and John, and the remainder in fee simple to her late husband's heirs. In 1399, John and his wife, Alice, granted all their property in Durham to John's mother, Thomasina, John de Kirkby of Kirkbythorpe, John de Haythorpe and William Lambeton junior.

== Bibliography ==
- Boynton, G. R., ed. (2003), Calendar of patent rolls, University of Iowa Libraries.
- Brown, William, ed. (1922), Yorkshire Deeds, Record series, vol. 50, Yorkshire Archaeological Society.
- Lyte, H. C. Maxwell, ed. (1894), "B. 2911", A descriptive catalogue of ancient deeds, vol. 2, British History Online, pp. 346–356.
- Surtees Society (1891), "Sawcock", Guisborough Chartulary, Publications of the Surtees Society, vol. 89, Surtees Society.
