= William de Mulsho =

King's Chamberlain
- In office 21 February 1365 – 1368 (TAQ)
- Monarch: Edward III
- Preceded by: Ralph de Brantingham

William de Mulsho (died c. 1376) was a Canon of Windsor from 1361 to 1368 and King's Chamberlain to Edward III from 1365 to 1375.

== Career ==
He was appointed:

- Surveyor of the King's Works at Windsor 1358 - 1359
- Clerk of the Works at the Tower of London and Westminster Palace
- Rector of Amersham 1361
- Prebendary of Abergwili Collegiate Church 1361
- Binder of books in St Paul's Cathedral 1361
- Prebendary of Bedford Major in Lincoln Cathedral 1361
- Prebendary of Dublin 1363
- Dean of St Martin's le Grand 1365 - 1368
- King's Chamberlain of the Receipt 1365 - 1375
- Prebendary of the First Stall in St Stephen's Westminster 1365 - 1368
- Prebendary of Hastings
- Rector of St Nicholas ad Macellas 1368
- Keeper of the (Household) Wardrobe 1375 – 1376

He was appointed to the eighth stall in St George's Chapel, Windsor Castle in 1361, and held the stall until 1368.
