= Carol Stone =

The Reverend Carol Stone TD
- Born: Peter James Stone; 1954; England
- Died: 27 December 2014 (aged 60); Wroughton, England
- Burial place: Swindon, England
- Other name: Carol Ann Stone
- Education: University of Leicester; Queens' College, Cambridge; Westcott House, Cambridge
- Spouses: Margaret (m. 1976; div. 1983); Jo-Anne (div.)

Ecclesiastical career
- Religion: Christianity (Anglican)
- Church: Church of England
- Ordained: 1978 (deacon); 1979 (priest)
- Offices held: Vicar of St Philip's Church, Swindon (1996–2014); Priest-in-Charge of St Peter's, Penhill (2006–2014)
- Military career
- Branch: British Army
- Service years: 1984–2004
- Rank: Chaplain to the Forces 3rd Class
- Service number: 520138
- Unit: Royal Army Chaplains' Department

Carol Ann Stone TD (formerly Peter James Stone, 1954–2014) was an English Anglican priest and chaplain. She was the first serving priest of the Church of England to transition from male to female. She was ordained in 1978 as a male, underwent sex reassignment surgery in 2000, and continued her ministry as a female.

== Early life and education ==
Stone was born in 1954. She studied at the University of Leicester, and graduated with a Bachelor of Arts degree in 1975. In 1976, Stone entered Westcott House, Cambridge, to train for ordination. She also studied theology at Queens' College, Cambridge, graduating from the University of Cambridge with a Bachelor of Arts degree in 1977 and being promoted to Master of Arts in 1981.

== Ordained ministry ==
Stone was ordained in the Church of England as a deacon in 1978 and as priest in 1979. She served her curacy at Holy Trinity Church, Bradford-on-Avon, a Liberal Anglo-Catholic church in the diocese of Salisbury. She received a National Broadcasting Award from the Sandford St Martin Trust in 1979 for her contributions to radio.

From 1981 to 1983, Stone held her first incumbency as rector of St Mary's Church, Corsley, Wiltshire, in the diocese of Salisbury. From 1983 to 1988, she served as chaplain and head of religious studies at Dauntsey's School, a private school in West Lavington, Wiltshire. From 1989 to 1994, she was vicar of St John the Evangelist's Church, Upper Studley, Trowbridge. Then she once more served as a chaplain, this time at Cheltenham College. In 1996, she was appointed vicar of St Philip's Church, Upper Stratton, Swindon.

In June 2000, it was announced that she would be taking a short break from her parish work to undergo sex reassignment surgery. She had the support of her bishop, Barry Rogerson, who stated:

The Rev Peter Stone has been under medical supervision for some time and has been diagnosed by two psychiatric practitioners as having a condition for which the appropriate medical treatment is Gender Redesignation. There are no ethical or ecclesiastical legal reasons why the Rev Carol Stone should not continue in ministry in the Church of England.

In November 2000, she returned to St Philip's and parish ministry and began using the name Carol Ann Stone. During her first Sunday service since returning, one woman shouted negative comments at her before being removed from the church by other churchgoers: a police officer had attended the service as a precautionary measure but did not have to become involved. Stone was given a standing ovation at the end of the service by the remaining members of the congregation.
Of the eighty members of the congregation, would be reduced to seventy six, with four members of the congregation leaving the church because of Vicar Stone's transition; the rest "agreed to welcome their priest back as a woman".

In 2006, she became a governor of Swindon College, having completed a course in photography there. In December 2006, she was appointed priest-in-charge of St Peter's Church, Penhill, Swindon, in addition to her role as vicar of St Philip's.

=== Military service ===
In addition to her parish ministry and school chaplaincy, Stone served as military chaplain. On 18 July 1984, she was commissioned into the Royal Army Chaplains' Department, Territorial Army, as a Chaplain to the Forces 4th Class (equivalent in rank to captain): she was given the service number 520138. From 1984 to 1989, she served as chaplain to a unit of the Army Cadet Force.

On 1 January 1990, she was transferred from TA Group B to TA Group A, therefore starting her service in the active reserve section of the Territorial Army. On 1 January 1996, she was promoted to Chaplain to the Forces 3rd Class (equivalent in rank to major). In June 2003, she was awarded the Efficiency Decoration (Territorial) in recognition of long service in the reserves.

She resigned her commission on 7 May 2004.

== Personal life ==
Stone had been twice married and divorced: first to Margaret, from 1976 to 1983, and secondly to Jo-Anne, an American. She had one child from her first marriage, a daughter, who was 18 years of age at the time of her transition in 2000.

Stone died on 27 December 2014 in Wroughton from pancreatic cancer and was buried in Swindon.
