= Adam de Stratton =

English moneylender

- Born: Stratton St Margaret, Wiltshire
- Died: c. 1292–1294
- Occupation: Moneylender

Adam de Stratton (died 1292–94) was a royal moneylender, administrator and clergyman under Edward I of England. He advanced professionally through the patronage of the earls of Devon, and became Chamberlain of the Exchequer and steward of Isabella, Countess of Devon. At the same time he made himself an enormous fortune through moneylending, primarily by acquiring debts from Jewish moneylenders. His business methods were dubious and often involved various illegal activities. In 1290 he fell victim to an investigation of corruption in the royal administration, and from 1292 until his death— no later than 1294—he was held in prison. Stratton has been called by a modern historian "the greatest and probably the most unscrupulous of thirteenth-century money lenders, who eventually met the fate he deserved."

== Early career ==
Adam Stratton was the son of Thomas de Argoges, or Arwillis, of Stratton St Margaret in Wiltshire. Adam himself used the name "de Argoges" until 1264, when he appears as "de Stratton"; a change which probably reflects his emergence as a major landowner in that area. He had at least three brothers, Thomas, William and Henry de Stratton, and one sister, Christine. He found Crown employment for all his brothers: Thomas and William had positions in the Exchequer, while Henry was a judge in Ireland in the 1270s.Nothing is known of Adam's early life; the first mention of him dates from 1256, when he was a royal clerk at the Exchequer. It is likely that he procured this position from the Redvers earls of Devon, with whom he had a strong connection throughout his career. The earls of Devon were hereditary chamberlains of the Exchequer. Through the Devon patronage he rose quickly through the ranks; in 1263 he became master of the king's works at Westminster, and Isabella, Countess of Devon's deputy as the chamberlain of the Exchequer. In 1276 Countess Isabella enfeoffed him with the chamberlainship, a position that was accompanied by several manors in Wiltshire. As a clergyman he was also a notorious pluralist, and in 1280 held 23 benefices.

The majority of his fortune, however, came from moneylending. Up until their expulsion in 1290, the major moneylenders in England were Jews, who were not covered by Christian bans on usury. During the reign of Henry III, however, the Jews were taxed at extortionate rates, and many were forced to sell acquired debts at reduced prices. These debts were lucrative because the buyers were not bound by the existing contract. They could demand higher rates, or sometimes even take forfeit in land. Stratton was one of the greater beneficiaries of the opportunities offered by trading in Jewish debts. From at least 1271 he was also associated with the Riccardi, a major Italian financier family.

== Illegal activities and downfall ==
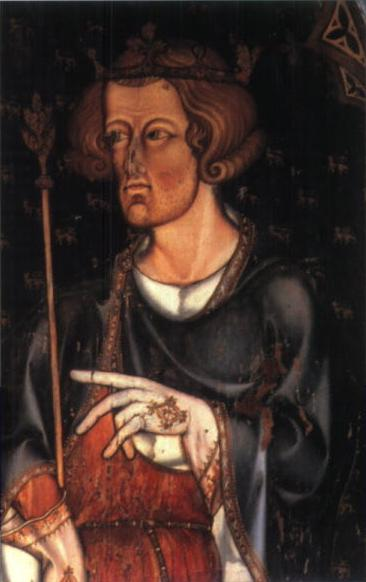
In 1290 Edward I carried out a purge of corruption in the royal administration, with Adam de Stratton as one of the main targets.

From 1277, Stratton acted in the capacity of Countess Isabella's steward, though he never officially used that title. It was in this post that he committed some of his most grievous offences. In 1278 he was accused of cutting off the seal of a charter from Quarr Abbey, thereby invalidating its authenticity. As a result, several other similar cases were brought to light, but none led to conviction. It was widely believed that he had bought himself off with bribes. Stratton's transgressions continued, however, and by the late 1280s, the complaints reached King Edward I. Edward returned from a prolonged stay in Gascony in late 1289, and immediately started a purge of corruption in the royal administration, including proceedings against Ralph de Hengham, Chief Justice of the King's Bench. Stratton was relieved of his office of chamberlain, along with his temporal possessions, on 17 January 1290. On his arrest, £12,666 17s 7d was found in his possession, a vast sum at the time, equivalent to about £15 million in present-day terms. According to the chronicle of Bartholomew Cotton, a silk-lined chest was also discovered, containing fingernail and toenail clippings, women's pubic hair, and feet of toads and moles. These were considered the ingredients of witchcraft, and the box was sealed up by officials, but Stratton managed to break the seal and throw the contents down into a latrine.

His friends procured a pardon for 500 marks by 12 June 1291, and Stratton was released. He retained his ecclesiastical rents of £1,000, which still made him a wealthy man. Still, the sum was insignificant compared to his previous holdings in land, which Cotton estimated at £50,000. His eventual downfall, however, resulted from an ongoing conflict with the Cluniac priory of Bermondsey. Stratton was convicted of forging a grant, and by Midsummer 1292 he was imprisoned in the Tower. By the end of the year he was condemned, and he is referred to as a felon in the years 1292–94. By 14 August 1294 he was dead, though it is not known whether he was executed or died from natural causes. According to F. M. Powicke, "the career of Adam de Stratton deserves our attention as a striking example of the interplay of public and private, local and central, royal and baronial, financial and administrative activities in social life."
