= Henry de Stratton =

English clergyman and Crown official

Henry de Stratton (died after 1277) was an English clergyman and Crown official who later served as a judge in Ireland. He was the brother of moneylender and Crown administrator, Adam de Stratton.

Adam and Henry were two of the four sons of Thomas de Argoges or Arwillis, of Stratton St Margaret, Wiltshire. They both took holy orders, as did a third brother, Thomas. They originally used their father's family name de Argoges, but later changed it to de Stratton, after their birthplace, probably as an indication of Adam's growing prosperity as a landowner in the Stratton area.

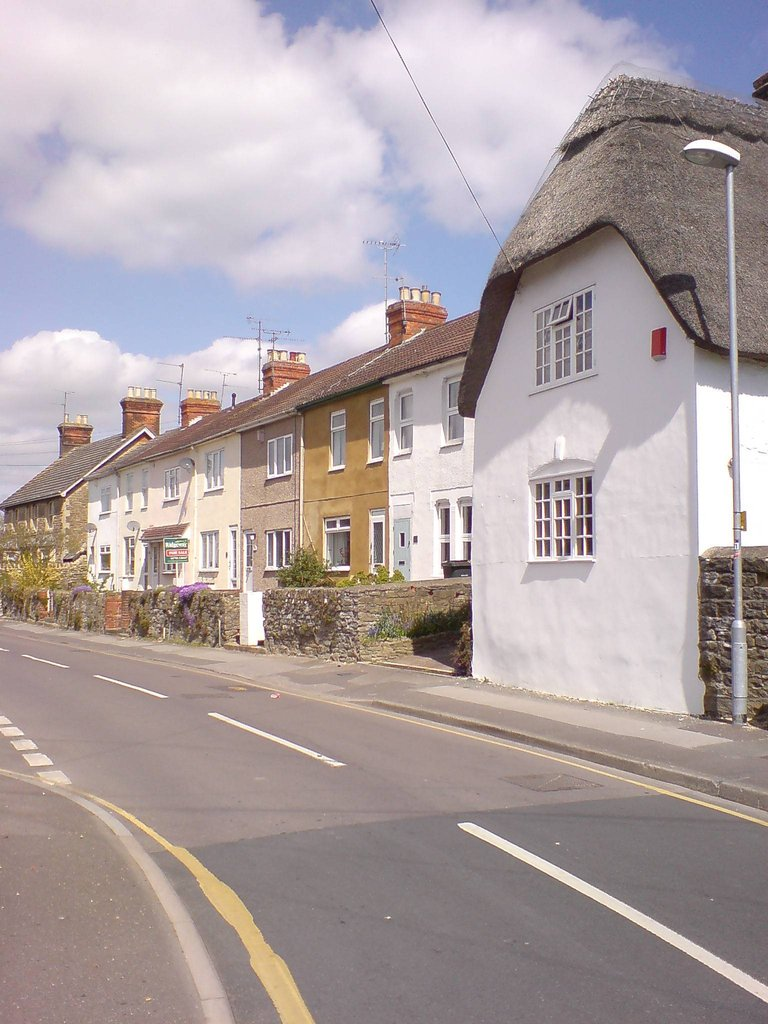
Stratton St Margaret, Wiltshire, birthplace of Henry and his brother Adam

Adam, once he had begun his own rise in the world, was generous to all his brothers. He found them jobs in the Exchequer, and in 1266 arranged for Henry and Thomas both to receive a Crown pension of threepence a day. Henry was presumably a qualified lawyer. He moved to Ireland, where he served as an itinerant justice in 1270–77.

Nothing seems to be known of his later years, in particular, whether he was involved in Adam's disgrace and downfall in 1290, following the exposure of his numerous acts of corruption.

== Sources ==
- Ball, F. Elrington The Judges in Ireland 1221-1921 London John Murray 1926
- Lee, Sidney, ed. (1898). "Stratton, Adam de" . Dictionary of National Biography. Vol. 55. London: Smith, Elder & Co.
- Prestwich, Michael Edward I University of California Press 1988
