= Chamberlain of the Exchequer =

The Chamberlains of the Exchequer were officials of the English Exchequer from its creation until 10 October 1826, when the offices were abolished and their duties transferred to the Auditor of the Exchequer.

== History of the office ==
The chamberlains originated as subordinates of the master chamberlain assigned to serve in the treasury, and migrated into the Exchequer as it became established under Henry I. The office of the original chamberlains became hereditary, and these chamberlains are sometimes called chamberlains-in-fee. It soon became a regular practice for them to appoint a knight to attend in the Exchequer and carry out their duties.

As the business of the Exchequer increased, the chamberlains in fee largely ceased their personal attendance on the Exchequer in favour of their deputies. On at least one occasion, during the reign of Edward I, a chamberlain in fee (the 9th Earl of Warwick) appointed two deputies, one to attend in the Exchequer of Pleas and the other in the Exchequer of Receipt; it was more usual for one deputy to be appointed, whose principal business was in the Receipt, or lower Exchequer. As the chamberlains in fee became merged into the Crown and ceased attendance, the deputies themselves became known as Chamberlains of the Exchequer or Chamberlains of the Receipt.

== Chamberlains in Fee ==
In the 12th century, the two hereditary positions of Chamberlains-in-Fee were held by the Maudit and Fitzgerald families.

The Maudit chamberlainship descended to the Beauchamp Earls of Warwick and passed into the hands of the Crown in 1483 upon the accession of Richard III, son-in-law of the 16th Earl. However, the office was also held by the crown from the death of Guy de Beauchamp in 1315 until the death of Edward II in 1327 because Guy's eldest son was only a young child.

The Fitzgerald chamberlainship passed by marriage to the Redvers Earls of Devon. In 1275 Isabel de Forz, the eldest daughter of Baldwin de Redvers, 6th Earl of Devon, and 8th Countess of Devon in her own right, alienated her chamberlainship-in-fee to her steward, the moneylender Adam de Stratton. He forfeited it to the Crown on her death in 1293, after which time the office-holders of this chamberlainship were appointed by patent.

== Chamberlains of the Receipt ==
Originally the deputies of the Chamberlains in Fee.

Appointed by the senior Chamberlain in Fee (the owner of the manor of Hanslope) until 1483, when that office was absorbed by the Crown, and thereafter by the monarch.

- William Rothmell c.1273–1274
- William Golafre 9 April 1274 – 1278
- Peter Leicester 8 November 1278 – c.1282
- William FitzNigel c.1284 – 10 May 1290
- William Pershore 10 May 1290 – 1309
- Peter le Blount 7 April 1309 – 17 May 1315
- John Golafre 18 May 1315 – 1315
- William Maldon 1 September 1315 – January 1326
- John Warin 20 January 1326 – 1327
- John Langton 20 June 1327 – 1330
- Nicholas Acton 16 April 1330 – 31 January 1337
- John Culcotes 31 January 1337 – 2 February 1337 (appointed pro tem by the Barons of Exchequer)
- John Houton 2 February 1337 – 1340
- Roger Ledbury 17 January 1341 – 1344
- John Houton 6 April 1344 – 8 March 1347
- John Buckingham 16 April 1347 – 1350
- William Rothwell 10 February 1350 – 1353
- Richard Pirriton 29 September 1353 – 1365
- John Newenham 21 February 1365 – 1369
- Adam Hertington 23 November 1369 – 1376
- John Hermesthorp 20 October 1376 – 1396
- John Oudeby 4 September 1396 – c.1414
- Nicholas Calton 14 July 1414 – c.1418
- John Throckmorton c.1418 – April 1445
- John Nanfan 1445–1446
- John Brown 3 June 1446 – 1450
- Thomas Colt 10 December 1450 – 1467
- Sir Walter Wrottesley 14 June 1468 – 10 April 1473
- Sir Roger Tocotes c.1474–1475
- Sir John Pilkington 14 April 1477 – 29 December 1478
- Sir James Tyrrell 14 January 1479 – 1485
- Sir William Stanley 23 September 1485 – 1495
  - Sir Sampson Norton 9 February 1495 – 8 February 1517 (joint)
  - Sir John Heron 9 February 1495 – 15 January 1522
- Sir Richard Jerningham January 1522 – 25 March 1525
- Sir Henry Guildford 26 April 1525 – May 1532
- Robert Radclyffe, 1st Earl of Sussex 4 June 1532 – 27 November 1542
- Thomas Wriothesley, 1st Earl of Southampton 29 January 1543 – 30 July 1550
- Sir Anthony Wingfield 29 August 1550 – 15 August 1552
- Sir John Cheke 12 September 1552 – 1553
- Robert Strelley 2 November 1553 – 23 January 1554
- Henry Stafford, 1st Baron Stafford 23 February 1554 – 30 April 1563
- Sir Nicholas Throckmorton 21 June 1564 – 12 February 1571
- Thomas Randolph 14 May 1572 – 8 June 1590
- Thomas West, 2nd Baron De La Warr 25 September 1590 – 24 March 1603
- George Young 7 June 1603 – 1606?
- Sir William Killigrew 6 January 1606 – 1608
- Sir Walter Cope 1 June 1608 – 1613
- Sir John Poyntz 18 February 1613 – 31 January 1618 (previously John Morice)
- Sir Nicholas Fortescue 26 February 1618 – 1623
- Sir Edward Bashe 30 May 1625 – 12 May 1653
- Edward Fauconberg 13 July 1655 – 1660
- Henry Hildyard 10 July 1660 – 8 January 1675
- Philip Hildyard 16 February 1675 – 1693
- Charles Cole May? 1693 – 5 March 1712
- Sir Simeon Stuart, 2nd Baronet 7 July 1712 – 11 August 1761
- Sir Simeon Stuart, 3rd Baronet 12 December 1761 – 19 November 1779
- Frederick North, 5th Earl of Guilford 13 December 1779 – 10 October 1826

Appointed by the junior Chamberlain in Fee (usually the owner of the manor of Highworth) until 1290, when that office was forfeited to the Crown, and thereafter by the monarch.

- Adam de Stratton c.1273–c.1278
- Henry de Stratton 22 November 1279 – 1290
- William de Estden 28 January 1290 – 1201
- David le Grant c.1291–1293
- Richard Louth 2 May 1293 – 29 November 1297
- William Brykhull 14 April 1298 – 1307
- Henry Ludgershall 23 August 1307 – 28 February 1312
- John Percy 16 March 1312 – 27 March 1312
- Richard Crumbwell 27 March 1312 – 1317
- James Spain 30 January 1317 – 1323
- John Langton 6 April 1323 – 1327
- Robert Swalclive 29 January 1327 – 1327
- John Leicester 10 October 1327 – 1340
- John Etton 6 April 1340 – 1347
- Thomas Cross 18 March 1347 – 1349
- Ralph Brantingham 31 January 1349 – 1365
- William Mulsho 21 February 1365 – 1375
- Robert Sibthorp 15 October 1375 – 1376
- Robert Crull 4 October 1376 – 1377
- John Bacon 28 August 1377 – 1385
- Thomas Orgrave 27 January 1385 – 1386
- John Lincoln 5 November 1386 – 1388
- Arnold Brocas 6 January 1388 – 29 September 1395
- Guy Mone 30 September 1395 – 19 February 1396
- John Godmanston 25 February 1396 – 1401
- John Ikelyngton 8 June 1401 – 1403
- John Legburn 9 September 1403 – 1413
- John Ikelyngton 30 March 1413 – 1415
- John Wodehouse 6 July 1415 – 27 January 1431
- John Hotoft 1 February 1431 – 29 April 1443
- Richard Alrede 5 May 1443 – 11 July 1443 (removed in favor of Cromwell's claim to the reversion of the office)
- Ralph de Cromwell, 3rd Baron Cromwell 11 July 1443 – 4 January 1455
  - Sir Thomas Neville 2 March 1456 – 1459 (joint)
  - Humphrey Bourchier 2 March 1456 – 1459 (joint)
- Sir Richard Tunstall 19 December 1459 – c.1460
- Humphrey Bourchier, 1st Baron Cromwell 4 March 1461 – 31 August 1465
- John Leynton 31 August 1465 – 14 April 1471
- William Hastings, 1st Baron Hastings 27 June 1471 – 13 June 1483
- Sir William Catesby 27 June 1483 – 25 August 1485
- Sir Richard Guildford 29 September 1485 – 1487
- Giles Daubeney, 1st Baron Daubeney 29 December 1487 – 21 May 1508
- George Talbot, 4th Earl of Shrewsbury 14 May 1509 – 26 July 1538
- Francis Talbot, 5th Earl of Shrewsbury 26 July 1538 – 28 September 1560
- George Talbot, 6th Earl of Shrewsbury 28 September 1560 – 18 November 1590
- Sir William More 23 November 1591 – 19 July 1600
- Sir George More 23 June 1601 – 1613
- Sir Nicholas Carew (Throckmorton) 11 January 1613 – February 1644
- Sir Robert Hatton 3 April 1644 – 1646
- Scipio le Squyer 8 February 1655 – September 1659
- Sir Nicholas Steward, 1st Baronet 1 October 1660 – 15 February 1710
- Sir William Ashburnham, 2nd Baronet 25 May 1710 – 4 November 1755
- Sir John Miller, 4th Baronet 4 November 1755 – 19 April 1772
- Montagu Burgoyne 17 July 1772 – 10 October 1826
