= Alfred Williams (poet) =

Alfred Owen Williams (7 February 1877 – 10 April 1930) was a poet, writer and a collector of folk song lyrics who was born and lived most of his life at South Marston, near Swindon, Wiltshire. He was almost entirely self-taught, producing his most famous work, Life in a Railway Factory (1915), in his spare time after completing a gruelling day's work in the Great Western Railway works in Swindon. He was nicknamed “The Hammerman Poet”.

== Early life and work at Swindon Works ==
Williams was born in Cambria Cottage in the village of South Marston, the son of a carpenter, and grew up in poverty after his father abandoned his wife and eight children. He became a farm labourer at eleven, and then, when he was fourteen, he entered Swindon Railway Works, where he worked as a steamhammer operator for the next twenty-three years.

== Literary works ==
Married in 1903, he pursued a demanding schedule of full-time work and private study. He published his first book of poems, Songs in Wiltshire, in 1909, but his health declined and he left the factory in 1914.

Williams published six volumes of poetry and a series of prose books about his home villages and others nearby, but died in poverty in 1930 in South Marston. Life in a Railway Factory has been described as “undisputed as the most important literary work ever produced in Swindon, about Swindon.”

== Bust of the writer ==
There is a bust of Williams by the artist Harry Carleton Attwood in the collection of Swindon Museum and Art Gallery.
