= Panattoni =

International real estate developer

Panattoni Development Company
- Company type: Inc.
- Industry: Real estate
- Founded: 1986; 40 years ago
- Founder: Carl Panattoni
- Headquarters: Irvine, California, USA
- Area served: United States; Canada; European Union; United Kingdom; India; Saudi Arabia; Mexico
- Key people: Carl Panattoni (Founder and Chairman) Adon Panattoni (Global Chief Executive Officer) Robert Dobrzycki (Chief Executive Officer and co-owner, Panattoni Europe & Asia)
- Website: www.panattoni.com; panattonieurope.com; panattoni.co.uk

Panattoni is a privately owned international real estate developer specializing in industrial real estate and logistics properties. The company operates across North America, Europe, and Asia.

Since its inception, Panattoni has delivered over 645 million square feet (approximately 60 million square metres) of industrial and logistics space worldwide, including more than 25 million square metres in Europe alone. The company invests approximately €8 billion annually in development projects across its markets.

It operates primarily on a speculative development model.

== History ==
Panattoni Development Company, Inc., was founded in 1986 in Sacramento, California, by Carl Panattoni and initially focused on industrial development in the United States. During the 1990s and early 2000s, the company expanded its presence across major U.S. logistics markets, establishing a development platform serving multiple provinces. It reached the Northwest in 2000. Based on self-reported figures for the 2001 operating year, it was the tenth-largest industrial developer in the United States by volume. By 2002, it had built over 6.5 million m^{2} of industrial property, half of which in the preceding three years, and its clients included Amazon, General Motors, and the Internal Revenue Service.

In 2005, Panattoni launched its Canadian branch with help from Michael Smele, Andy Smele and Wade Dobbin. It soon speculatively built the largest facility of its kind in the country (over 100,000 m^{2}) that was leased exclusively to Canadian Tire, with the client later turning into an investment partner. Also in 2005, Panattoni began operations in Europe, opening its first office in Poland. Over the following years the company expanded rapidly across the continent and became one of the most active developers of logistics and industrial real estate in Europe. Panattoni operates in 17 European countries, including the United Kingdom (which it entered through a merger with First Industrial Development in 2017), Germany, France, Spain (since 2020), Portugal, the Netherlands (since 2020), Belgium, Italy, the CEE and the Nordic region. In 2014, the integrated building contractor entity Panattoni Construction was renamed to Alston Construction. From 2015 to 2023, Panattoni ranked as Europe’s largest industrial and logistics real estate developer by volume of space delivered, according to annual rankings published by PropertyEU. The company held the top position for eight consecutive editions of the ranking before the publication ceased in 2023. As of 2019, the company was headquartered in Newport Beach, California, where Carl Panattoni owned a mansion.

In 2022, Panattoni expanded into India, establishing a regional platform and announcing large-scale industrial and logistics developments in southern India. In 2024, the company launched operations in Saudi Arabia, marking its entry into the Middle Eastern market. In 2026, Panattoni announced its planned expansion into Mexico as part of its continued growth in the Americas. By 2025, the company was considered "the largest privately held, full-service real estate development company in the world".

== Notable projects ==
- Project Archer, Target Regional Flow Center (Hampton, Georgia) - Target partnered with Panattoni to design and build a next-generation Flow Center to support logistics and order fulfillment in the Southeastern United States. This project marks one of the largest fulfillment centers in the area, totaling over 1.3 million square feet.
- Petco Distribution Center (Reno, NV) - Panattoni partnered with Petco to deliver their first ground-up distribution center, a state-of-the-art facility located in Reno, Nevada. The project features 748,650 square feet of warehouse space and was designed to optimize logistics and support both Petco’s retail and e-commerce operations.
- Panattoni Park Swindon (Wiltshire, UK) – A large brownfield redevelopment project comprising approximately 670,000 square metres of industrial and logistics space. Construction commenced in 2022.
- Mercedes-Benz International Consolidation Centre (Bischweier, Germany) – A purpose-built logistics and consolidation facility of approximately 130,000 square metres, developed for Mercedes-Benz AG.
- Amazon portfolio - Panattoni has developed multiple large-scale fulfilment and logistics facilities for Amazon across Europe and America. Collectively, these developments account for several million square metres of warehouse space delivered and include multi-storey fulfilment centres and robotics-enabled facilities.

== Data centers ==
In the mid-2020s, Panattoni expanded its development activities into the data center sector in North America and Europe. In August 2024, the company publicly announced plans to begin developing data centers in the United States, with a strategic initiative to build approximately 1 gigawatt of capacity over the following five years.

In Spain, Panattoni secured planning consent for a campus-scale data center in Cerdanyola del Vallès near Barcelona, projected to be one of the largest in Catalonia. The project is designed as a multi-phase development with an installed capacity of up to 88 MW, with the first phase expected to be operational by late 2026.
