= St Andrews West and Tadpole =

Ward of Swindon Borough Council

- ward Swindon Borough Council
- Major settlements: Redhouse; Tadpole Garden Village

Current ward
- Created: 2026
- Councillor: Daniel Adams (Conservative)
- Councillor: Cherie Adams (Conservative)
- Number of councillors: 2
- Created from: St Andrews
- UK Parliament constituency: Swindon North

St Andrews West and Tadpole is an electoral ward in the Borough of Swindon, Wiltshire, England. It elects two councillors to Swindon Borough Council and was first contested in 2026, replacing the St Andrews ward, the other half of which was split into St Andrews East.

== Ward profile ==
The ward is based on the western half of the St Andrews civil parish and is primarily suburban, covering the areas of Redhouse and Tadpole Garden Village, which are large northern suburbs of Swindon developed in the 2000s and 2010s respectively. For general elections, the ward is part of the Swindon North constituency.

== Councillors ==
Election	Councillors (2 seats)	
2026	Daniel Adams (Conservative)	Cherie Adams (Conservative)

== Election results ==
2026 Swindon Borough Council election: St Andrews West & Tadpole (2 seats)
Party	Candidate	Votes	%
Conservative	Daniel Adams	1,086	43.5
Conservative	Cherie Adams	881	35.3
Reform	Marjorie Jefferies	608	24.4
Labour Co-op	Jason Mills	605	24.2
Labour Co-op	Theresa Draper	596	23.9
Reform	Vincent Williams	593	23.8
Green	Syed Bukhari	450	18.0
Liberal Democrats	Dawn Pajak	174	7.0
Turnout		2,694	37.6
Registered electors		7,164	
Conservative win (new seat)			
Conservative win (new seat)			

== See also ==
- List of electoral divisions and wards in Wiltshire
- St Andrews East
- St Andrews (Swindon ward)
