= St Andrews East =

Ward of Swindon Borough Council

- ward Swindon Borough Council
- Major settlements: St Andrews Ridge

Current ward
- Created: 2026
- Councillor: Jake Chandler (Conservative)
- Councillor: Kate Tomlinson (Conservative)
- Number of councillors: 2
- Created from: St Andrews
- UK Parliament constituency: Swindon North

St Andrews East is an electoral ward in the Borough of Swindon, Wiltshire, England. It elects two councillors to Swindon Borough Council and was first contested in 2026, replacing the St Andrews ward, the other half of which was split into St Andrews West and Tadpole.

== Ward profile ==
The ward is primarily suburban, covering the areas of Abbey Farm, Ash Brake, Eastbury, Groundwell West, St Andrews Ridge, and partially Abbey Meads. All of these suburbs were developed as part of Swindon's northwards expansion in the 1990s and 2000s. The ward is situated in the eastern half of the St Andrews civil parish. For general elections, the ward is part of the Swindon North constituency.

== Councillors ==
Election	Councillors (2 seats)	
2026	Jake Chandler (Conservative)	Vera Tomlinson (Conservative)

== Election results ==
2026 Swindon Borough Council election: St Andrews East (2 seats)
Party	Candidate	Votes	%
Conservative	Jake Chandler*	1,298	52.1
Conservative	Kate Tomlinson	1,281	51.5
Reform	Daniel Marland	604	24.3
Reform	Brigid Watkis	549	22.1
Labour Co-op	Carol Shelley*	483	19.4
Labour Co-op	Simon Shelley*	385	15.5
Green	Chris Payne	379	15.2
Turnout		2,676	43.6
Registered electors		6,134	
Conservative win (new seat)			
Conservative win (new seat)			

== See also ==
- List of electoral divisions and wards in Wiltshire
- St Andrews West and Tadpole
- St Andrews (Swindon ward)
