= Victorian Turkish baths =

Dry-air sweating and washing bath

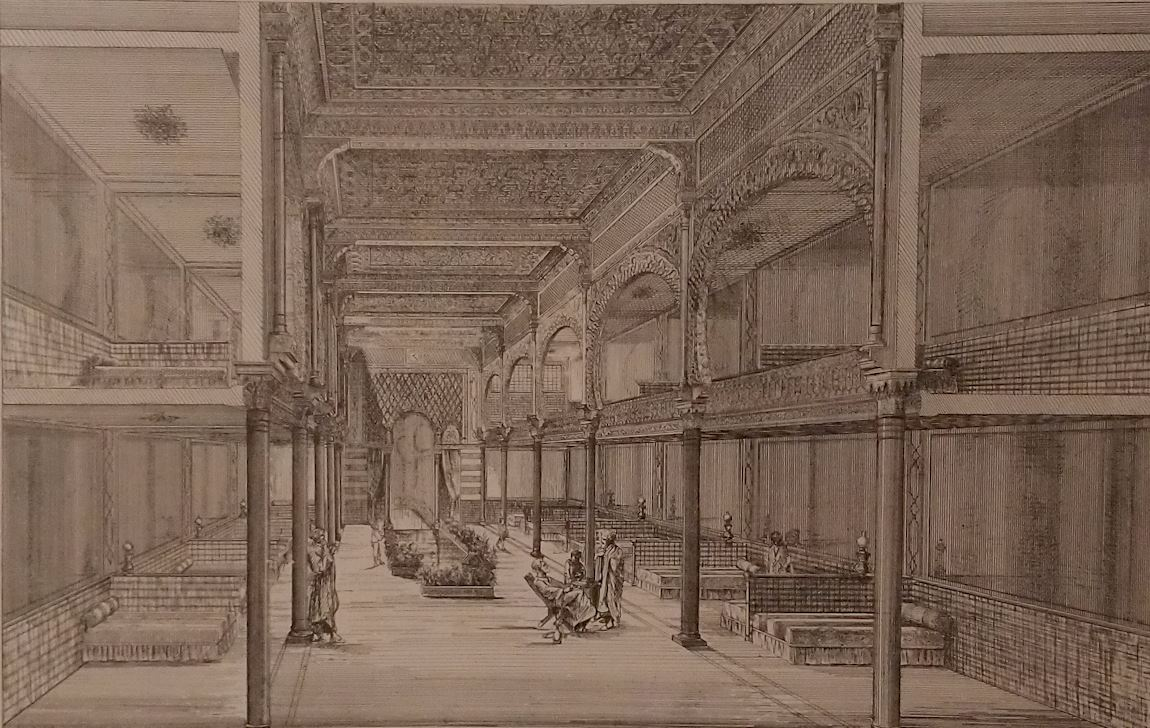
Cooling room in Le Hammam Bains Turco-Romains, Paris, based on the Jermyn Street baths

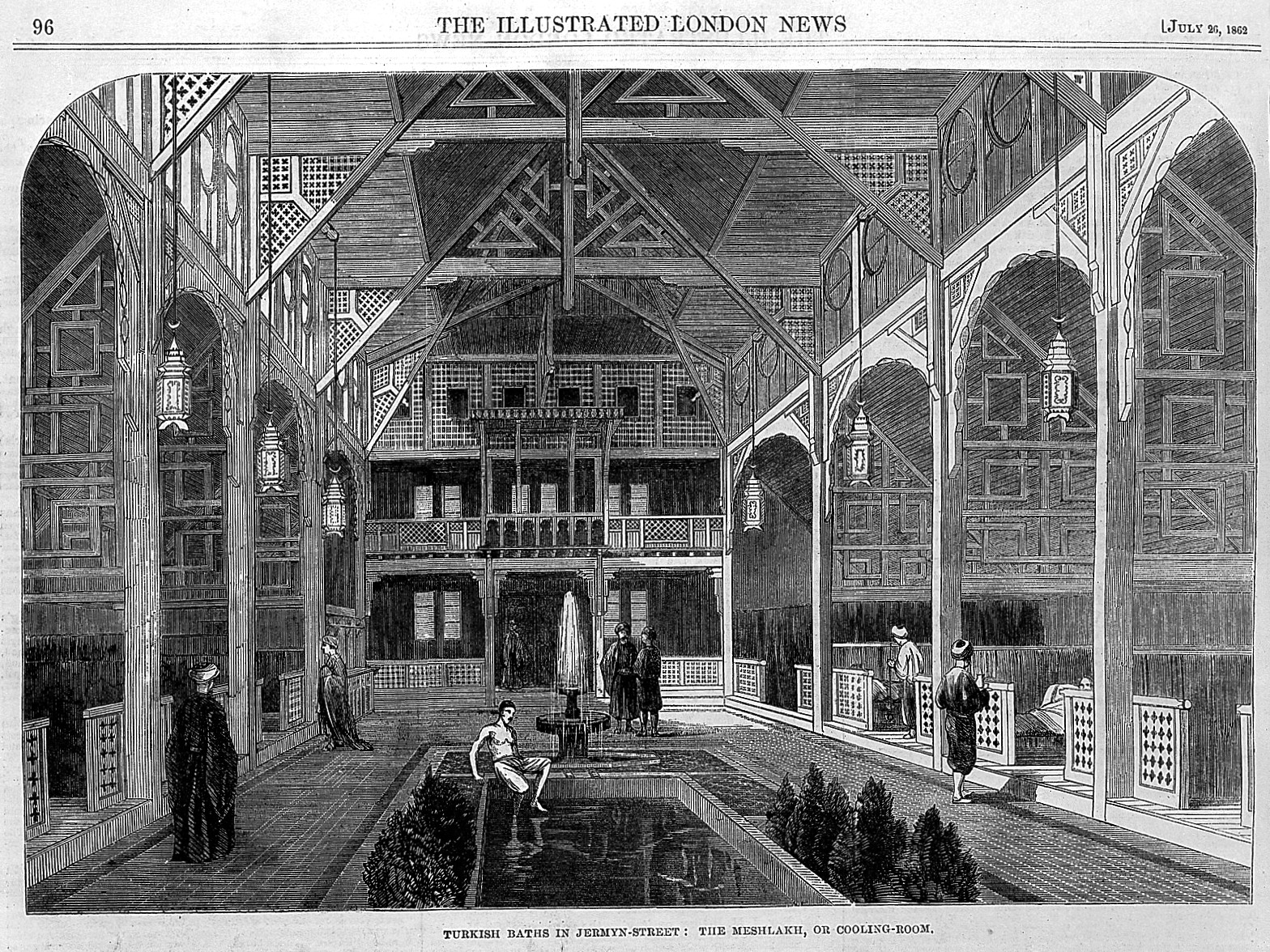
Turkish baths in Jermyn Street; the Meshlakh or cooling-room

The Victorian Turkish bath is a type of bath in which the bather sweats freely in hot dry air, is then usually washed and massaged (together known as shampooing), and has a cold wash or shower. It can also mean, especially when used in the plural, an establishment where such a bath is available.

Hot-air baths of the same type, built after Queen Victoria's reign (1837–1901), are known as Victorian-style Turkish baths, and are also covered in this article.

The Victorian Turkish bath became popular during the latter third of the queen's reign. It retained this popularity during the Edwardian years (1901–1914), first as a therapy and a means of personal cleansing, and then as a place for relaxation and enjoyment. It was very soon copied in several parts of the British Empire, in the United States, and in some Western European countries. Victorian Turkish baths were opened as small commercial businesses, and later by those local authorities that saw them as being permitted under the Baths and Washhouses Act 1846. They were also found in hotels, hydropathic establishments (hydros) and hospitals, in the Victorian asylum and the Victorian workhouse, in the houses of the wealthy, in private members' clubs, and in ocean liners for those travelling overseas. They were even provided for farm animals and urban workhorses.

Some establishments provided additional facilities such as steam rooms and, from the second half of the 20th century, Finnish saunas. These complemented the Turkish bath, but were not part of the Turkish bath process, any more than were the services of, for example, the barber, visiting physician, or chiropodist (currently more usually known as a podiatrist), any of whom might be available in some 19th-century establishments.

The use of Victorian Turkish baths began to decline after World War I and accelerated after World War II. In the 21st century, there are very few Victorian Turkish bath buildings extant, and fewer still remain open.

== Terminology and usage ==
The Victorian Turkish bath is a type of hot-air bath that originated in Ireland in 1856. It was explicitly identified as such in the 1990s and then named and defined to necessarily distinguish it from the baths which had for centuries, especially in Europe, been loosely, and often incorrectly, called "Turkish" baths. These were usually Islamic hammams, but during the latter part of the 20th century, steam and vapour baths of various types also came to be referred to as "Turkish" baths. The term has even been used to describe women's baths in the Ottoman Imperial Harem, most famously by Lady Mary Wortley Montagu, and as the title—or as the supposed subject—of orientalist paintings.

When the first Victorian Turkish baths were being built, there was much discussion about how the bath should be named. Because it was based on the baths of the ancient Romans and not on the Islamic hammam, many argued that it should be called the Roman bath or the Irish-Roman or Anglo-Roman bath. Some bath proprietors felt strongly about this and named their baths accordingly. But the new baths finally became known as Turkish baths because, for many years, that is where western travellers had first come across, and frequently written about, the 'exotic' hot-air baths of earlier times.

== The Victorian Turkish bath process ==
In a Victorian Turkish bath, bathers relax in a series of increasingly hot dry rooms, usually two or three, until they sweat profusely. This progression can be repeated, interspersed with showers, or a dip in a cold plunge pool. It is then followed by a full body wash and massage, together called shampooing. Finally, no less important, is a period of relaxation in the cooling-room, preferably for at least an hour.

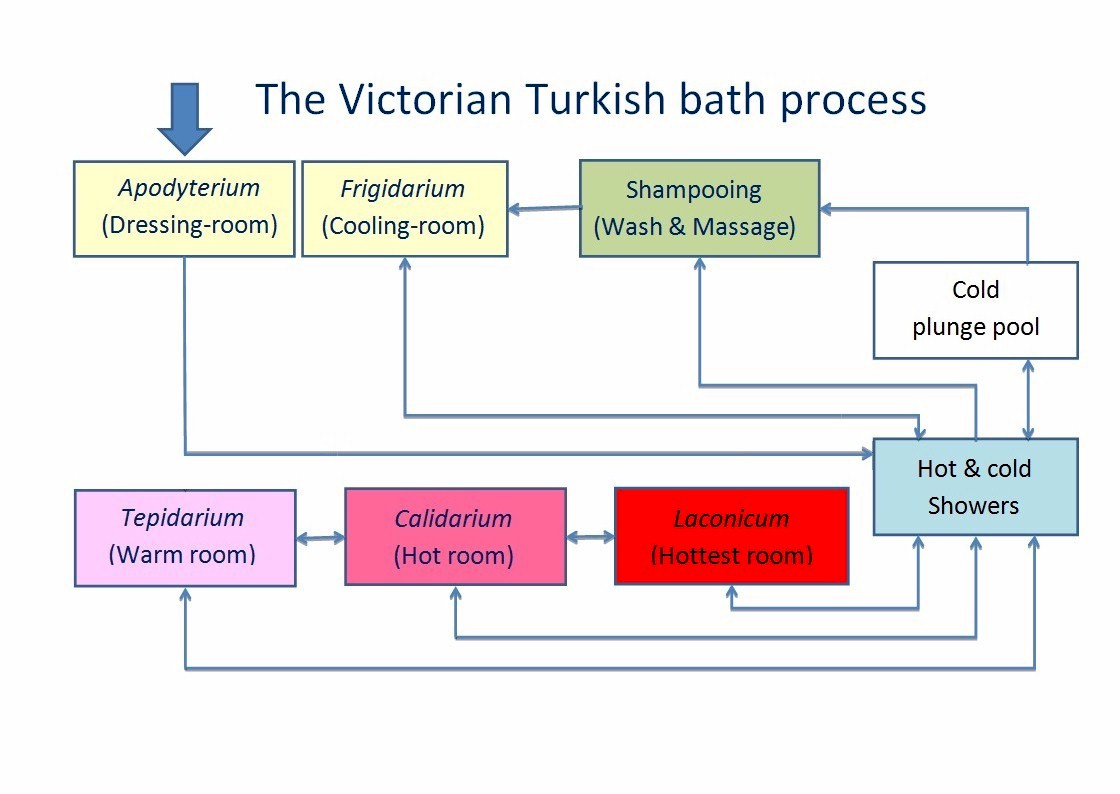
Flow chart of a typical Victorian Turkish bath

There is no standard prescribed route through the rooms of a Victorian Turkish bath, though some establishments may recommend one, while some others are physically arranged so that a standard route seems to be predetermined, as in the baths built by the Metropolitan Borough of Camberwell in Old Kent Road.^{:p. 30}

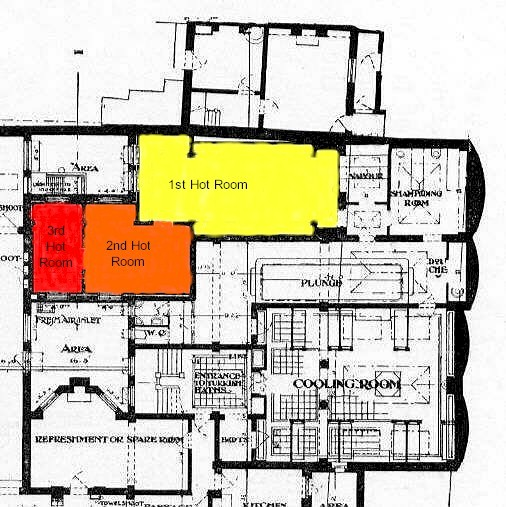
Plan of Old Kent Road baths, Camberwell, showing predetermined route through the hot rooms

Some bathers prefer to start in the hottest room and work towards the cooling-room; others never venture into the hottest room and prefer to start with the coolest and work their way into hotter areas. Once acclimatised, bathers usually go back and forth as they wish, but it is considered important always to end with a rest in the cooling-room. Bathers should never remain in a Turkish bath if they feel the slightest bit dizzy or uncomfortable.

Since the purpose of the Victorian Turkish bath is to expose the surface of the body—the pores of the skin—to the hot dry air, the European practice of bathing naked is the most effective one, and costumes are prohibited for hygienic reasons. This, as explained in numerous brochures published by Turkish baths and saunas, is because the typical short shower neither removes sweat from a bathing costume before entering the pool, nor any pool chemicals from a costume on re-entering the hot-rooms afterwards, whereas both sweat and residual chemicals are more effectively removed from an uncovered body.

In Britain, for most of the 20th and late 19th centuries, men and women were able to bathe naked in separate baths, or separate sessions, a writer in the Christian World noting in 1881 that 'man in a state of nudity' may be seen 'any day in a Turkish bath'.

This was not only the case in commercial Turkish baths but, well into the 20th century, in local authority baths also. Alfred Cross, who designed baths for the Metropolitan Borough of Finsbury (Ironmonger Row Baths, 1931) and the Urban District Council of Epsom (1935), had earlier defined the Turkish bath, in his then standard work on public baths and wash-houses, as 'the exposure of the nude body to hot dry air, massaging or shampooing, ablution with warm and cold water, and finally drying and cooling'.

In London, Bermondsey Council took nudity for granted in a promotional film made for them in the 1930s.

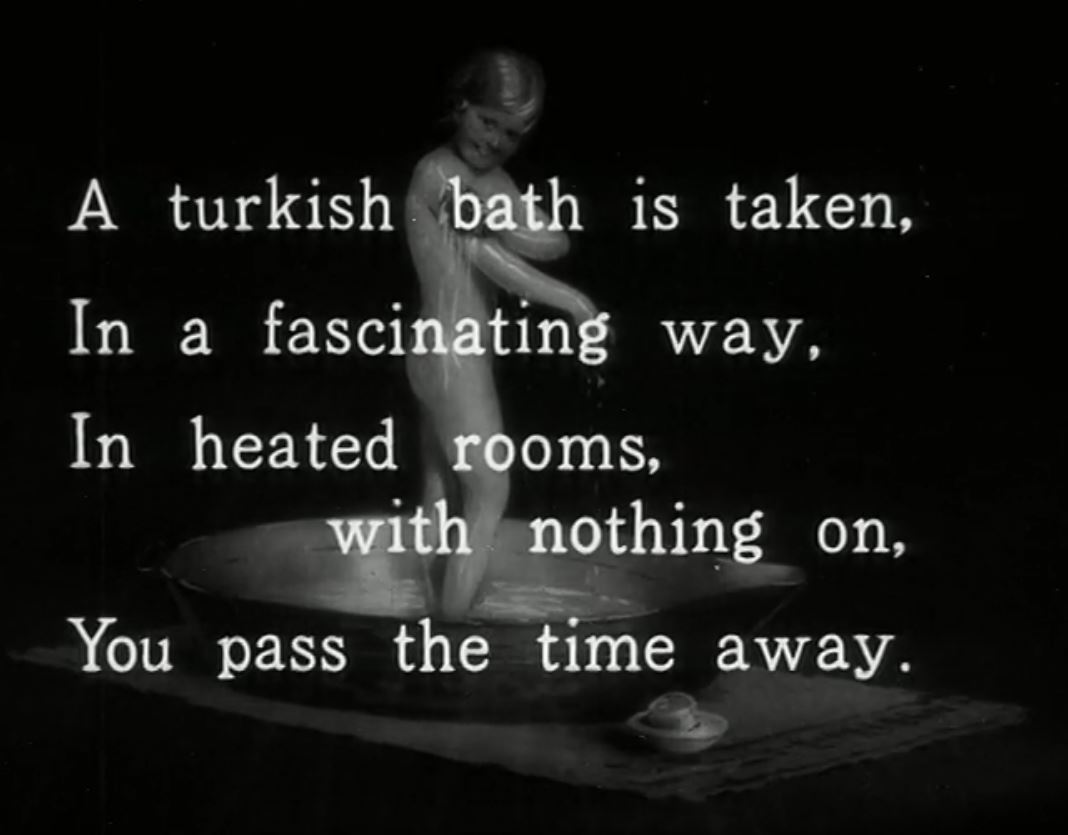
Still from 'Where there's life there's soap'

Although many British bathers prefer bathing in the Turkish bath without costumes, or just loosely covered with a towel, nudity in local authority baths is now rare, even in single sex sessions. However, a few local authorities and private members' clubs hire their Turkish baths to local naturist clubs where nude bathing is the rule.

Whether costumed or not, bathers normally cover seating with a towel before sitting or lying down. This also helps protect against accidental burns from seats which have been vacant for some time.

== History ==
=== The Victorian Turkish bath: Islamic and ancient Roman influences ===
Two people were primarily responsible for the introduction of the Victorian Turkish bath into the 19th century's United Kingdom of Great Britain and Ireland: Scottish diplomat and sometime MP for Stafford, David Urquhart (1805–1877), and Irish physician and hydropathist (an early hydrotherapist), Richard Barter (1802–1870), founder and proprietor of St Ann(e)'s Hydropathic Establishment near Blarney, Co. Cork.

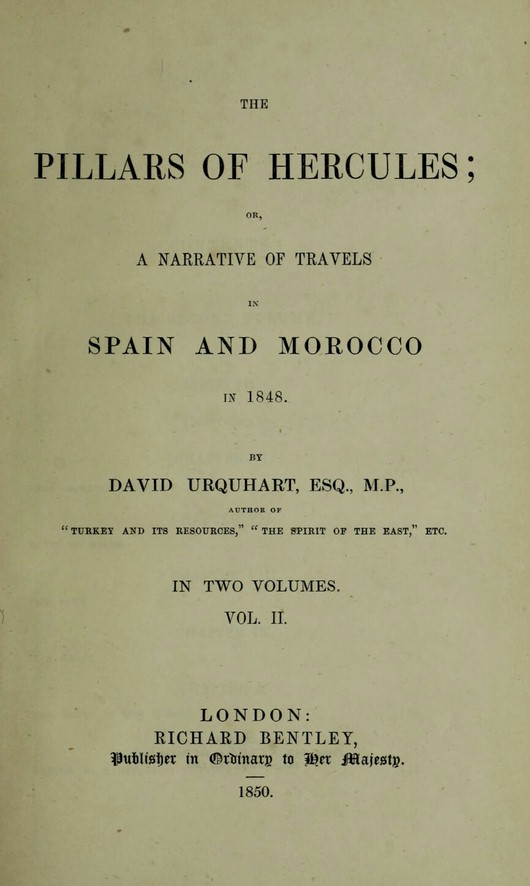

Urquhart came across the Islamic hammam while serving in the Ottoman Empire in the 1830s. He described the system of relatively dry hot-air baths used in Morocco and Turkey, which had changed little since Roman times, in his travel book The Pillars of Hercules, and became an advocate of the bath for the remainder of his life. Barter had already been using vapour baths at St Ann's, and when, in 1856, he read Urquhart's description of the hammam he was, 'electrified; and resolved, if possible, to add that institution to [his] establishment'. He realised that the human body can tolerate a higher temperature when exposed to dry air than it can when exposed to vapour. Believing that a higher temperature increased the curative effectiveness of the bath, he invited Urquhart to St Ann's, offering him 'land, workmen, and materials', to help him build one for his patients.

Their first attempt, in the shape of a 'little beehive-shaped thatched building' failed due to its inability to heat the air sufficiently.^{:p. 16}

Urquhart returned to his political work in England but Barter persevered. He sent his architect to Rome to study the ancient Roman baths. On his return, based on what he learned in Rome and the plans and details he brought back,^{:p. 130} he built a bath at St Ann's differing from the traditional Islamic hammam in the dryness of the heated air.^{:p. 102} This was the first Victorian Turkish bath, known today in Europe as the Irish-Roman bath in honour of Barter and his architect—also coincidentally named Richard Barter, though they were not related.

=== Early Victorian Turkish baths in Ireland and England ===
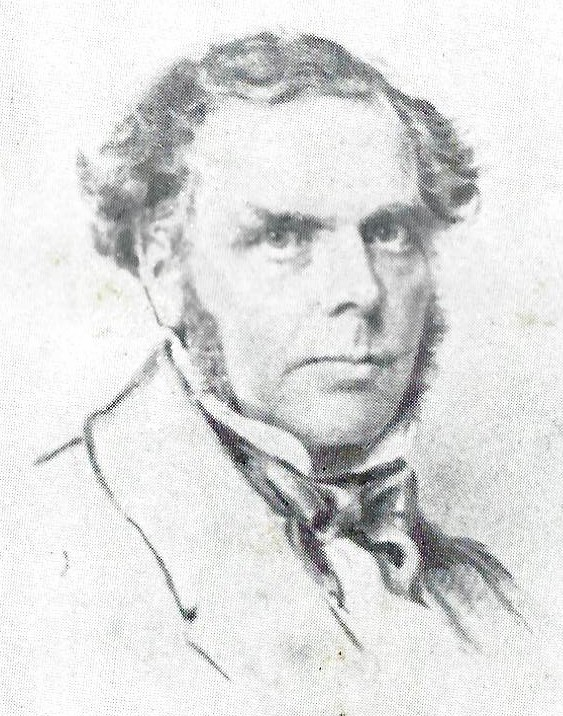
Dr Richard Barter

Barter's first successful bath at St Ann's was formally opened on 11 May 1858, though it had already been in use for some time, while still in the process of being improved. The three main rooms were the sudatorium (the hottest), the tepidarium, and the frigidarium (cooling-room). Even while experiments were continuing, Barter was promoting the bath throughout Ireland.

On 17 March 1859, he opened the first Turkish bath in the country to be built for use by the general public at 8 Grenville Place, in nearby Cork. There were separate baths for men and women at a cost of one shilling. Children under ten paid half price and 'A servant attending is free of charge'. Shampooing was not included and cost an additional sixpence. Between 1859 and 1869, Barter, or companies associated with him, built nine other baths in Ireland, while at least forty others are known to have been in existence as standalone establishments at some time during the following hundred years. There are no longer any Turkish baths in Ireland today.

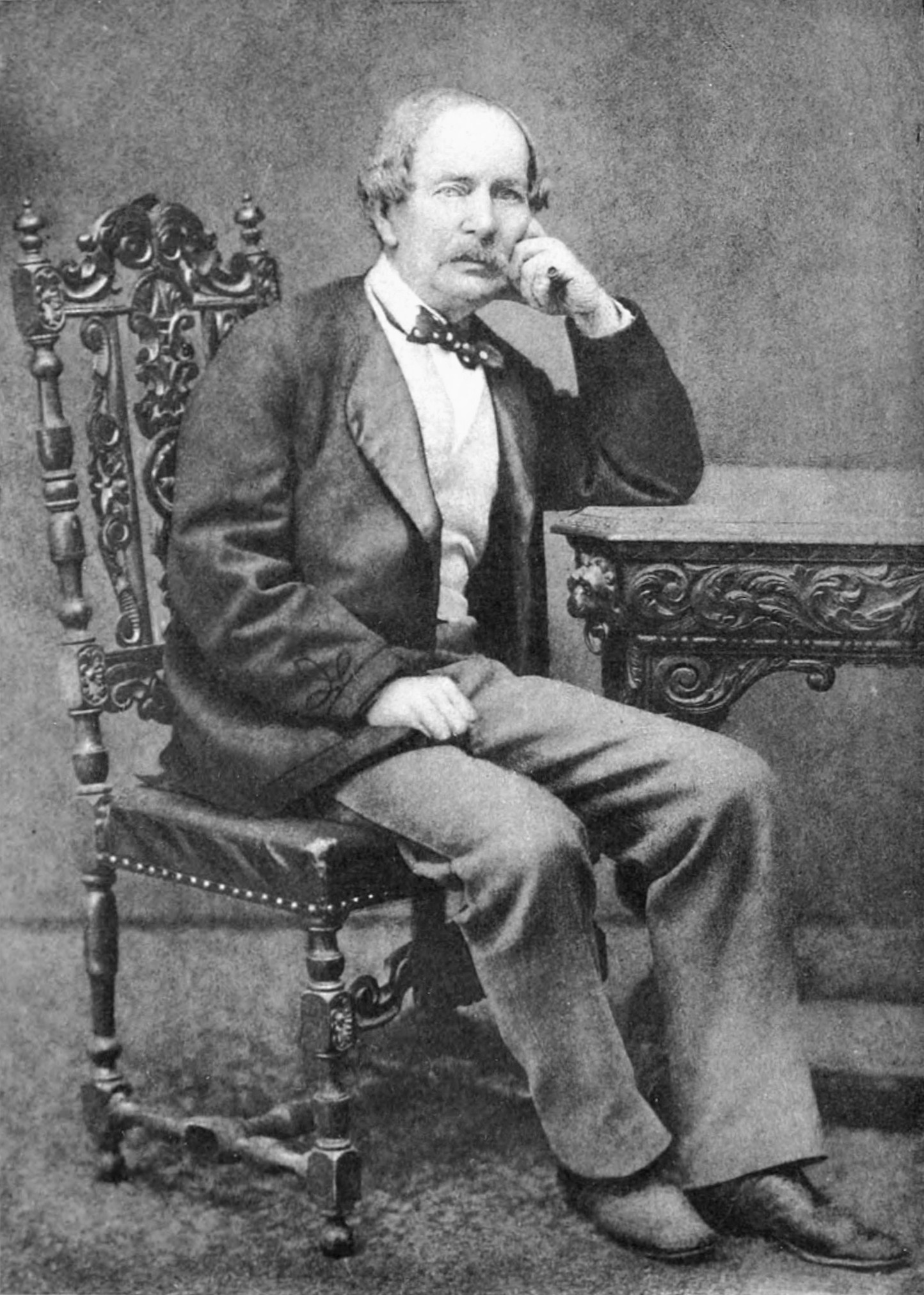
David Urquhart

Back in England, Urquhart was kept in touch with Barter's progress while he was actively involved in campaigning on behalf of Turkey prior to the Crimean War. He had gathered around himself, particularly in the north of England, groups of mainly working class political followers calling themselves Foreign Affairs Committees (FACs), whose main activities were calling meetings and writing to newspapers.

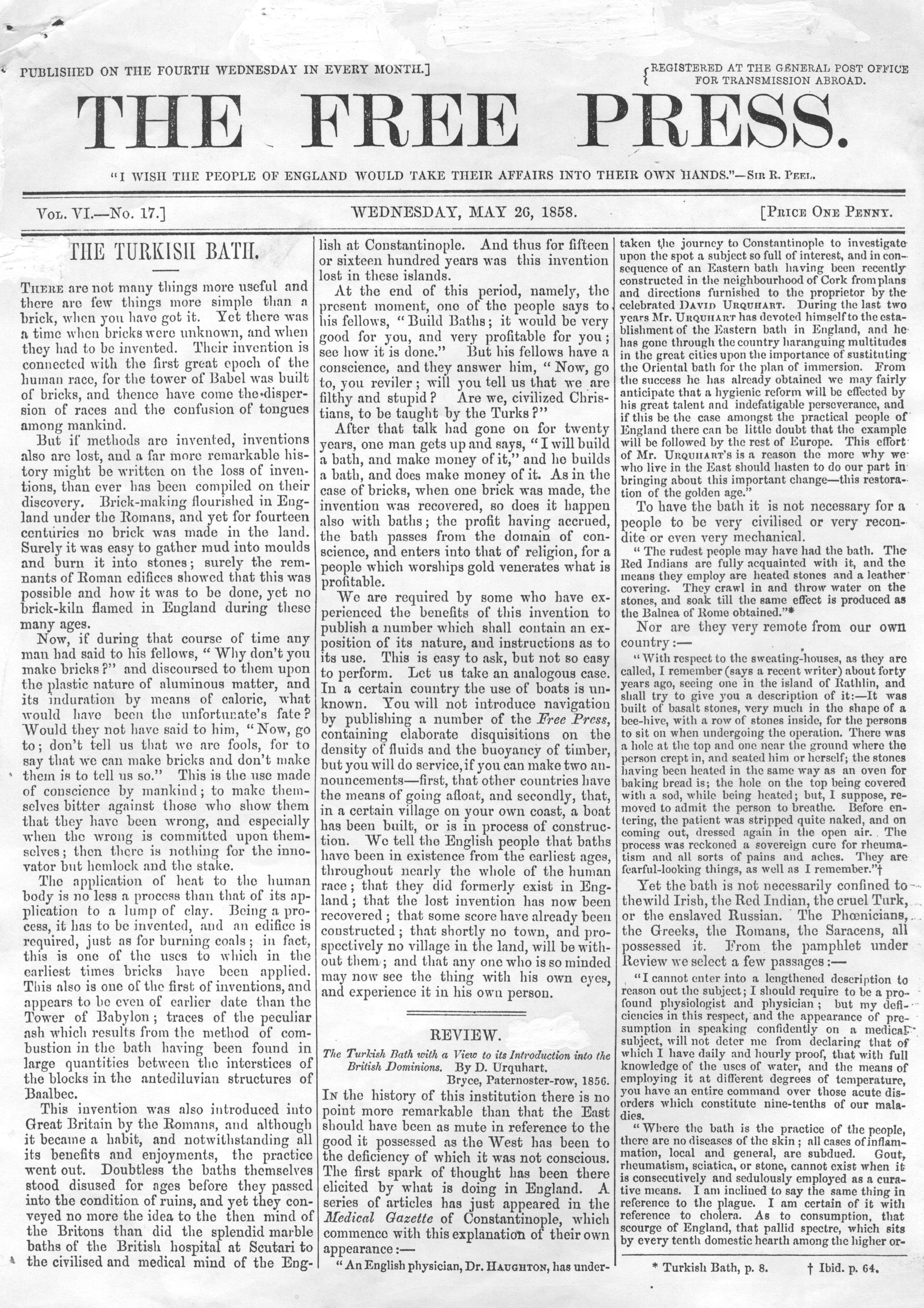
The Free Press

Their political views were promulgated in the Sheffield Free Press, a paper owned for a while by local politician Isaac Ironside, who led the Sheffield FAC. After Ironside had, at Urquhart's suggestion, visited St Ann's for his own health, the paper, and its later London version The Free Press, also acted (from 29 March 1856) as a means of communication about Turkish baths.

Letters to both papers on St Ann's and on the progress of its Turkish bath were published, and were of great interest to many FAC members. Urquhart encouraged them to start Turkish baths to provide themselves with a living, to give them more time to support his political work, and to have places where they could freely hold political meetings.

The opening in Manchester of the first Victorian Turkish bath in England, some time around 12 July 1857, was proudly announced in the Free Press papers. Urquhart had helped finance its building in part of the Broughton Lane home of FAC member William Potter who managed, and later owned it. From the beginning, separate sessions for women were supervised by his wife Elizabeth.

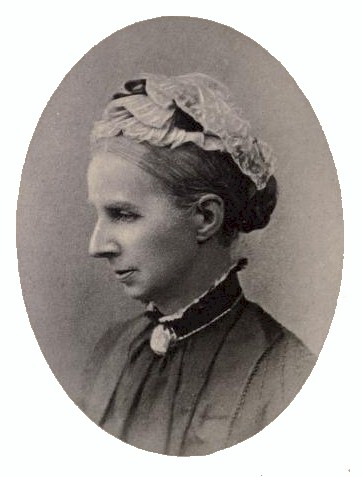
Harriet Urquhart

Around England, Urquhart's FACs, regularly brought up-to-date by the Free Press papers, were responsible for starting at least thirty Turkish baths.^{:p. 35} Except in Ireland, where Barter was the main influence, the FAC members and their baths soon inspired others to start opening them. In this, as in all work with the FACs, Urquhart's wife Harriet was totally involved. She agreed that the bath at Riverside, their home near Rickmansworth, should be open to all who wished to try it, whether they were his servants, friends or neighbours, local doctors with their patients, FACs wanting information, or their members who were unwell. She kept many sciatic and invalid guests over for breakfast. 'Some days there were as many as twenty-five people using it.'

From Manchester, Turkish baths spread north to the Urquhartite stronghold of Newcastle, where a bath was installed at the Newcastle upon Tyne Infirmary, and simultaneously down through the Midlands, another area with many FACs, until they reached London, where Roger Evans opened the first in Bell Street, near Marble Arch, in 1860.

=== Early Victorian Turkish baths in Scotland and Wales ===
==== Scotland ====
It is not known for certain when the first Turkish bath opened in Scotland. In Glasgow, two opened within months of each other in 1860. Peter Jack claimed to have opened the first some time in June and this seems to have been a small one with a single hot room, at 366 Argyll Street. But by the end of December his baths had been 'entirely re-constructed' and had three hot rooms. Although the Public Baths and Wash-houses Acts did not apply in Scotland, Jack's Roman or Turkish Baths provided first and second class baths, as many commercial Turkish baths were to do in England. Both classes also had Ladies' days.

In mid-September, Mr P Tracy, lessee of the 'well-known and long-established' Victoria Baths at 106 West Nile Street, announced his intention to convert 'a large part of the establishment' into a Turkish bath. By 22 September, the new baths were open with two hot rooms, a cooling-room, a variety of showers and dressing rooms. There was only a single class of baths, with Wednesday mornings set aside for ladies.

Hydropathic establishments in Scotland were quick to follow the trend, possibly fearing loss of clients to the new standalone baths in the cities. By November 1860, Alex Munro had added a Turkish bath 60-foot (18 m) long to his Lochhead Hydro just outside Aberdeen. And in Edinburgh, Dr James Lawrie advertised the opening, on 15 May 1861, of a Turkish bath to complement the original medicated baths at his Sciennes Hill Hydro.

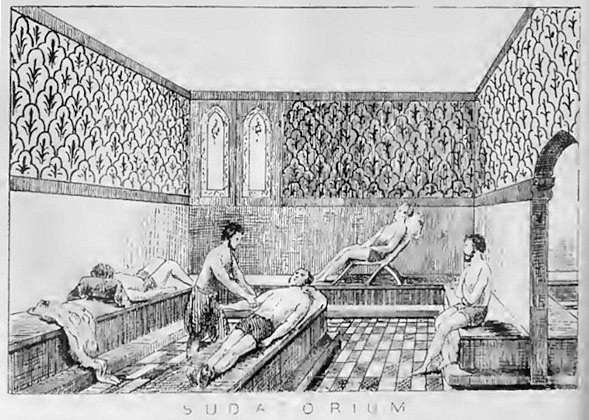
Allshorn's sudatorium

A couple of months later, Edinburgh's first standalone Turkish baths were opened just behind number 90 Princes Street by Dr G E Allshorn. Keeping the hydros in mind, Allshorn emphasised in his advertisements that the baths were 'Under Medical Superintendence'. Known as the Edinburgh Roman or Turkish Bath, the cooling-room and three hot rooms were all called by their Roman names. Edinburgh and Glasgow soon had a number of other Turkish baths, in addition to those opening in many other cities and towns in Scotland.

Scottish local authorities never became Turkish bath providers to the extent that pertained in England, but there were exceptions. Dundee Council took over a privately owned baths establishment at West Protection Wall in 1870 and three years later planned major extensions and the addition of Turkish baths. These were open by September 1876.

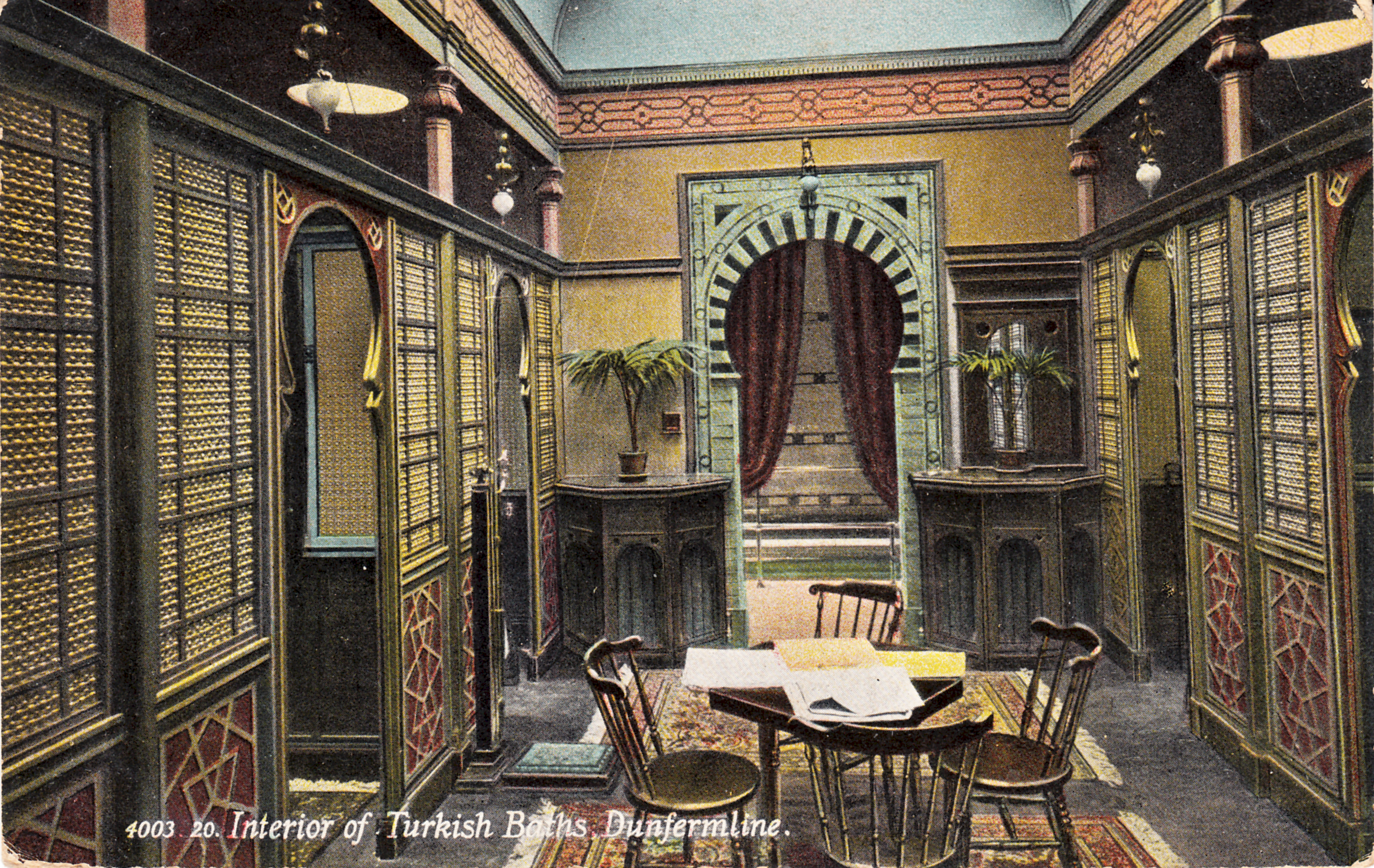
Cooling-room in Dunfermline's second Turkish baths in Pilmuir Street

A year later, Dunfermline Burgh Corporation opened swimming and Turkish baths in Schoolend Street. These were paid for by a gift of £5,000 from steel magnate Andrew Carnegie to the people of his hometown. Further gifts from Carnegie totalling £45,000 enabled the corporation to replace them by building a larger set of baths in Pilmuir Street which opened on 31 March 1905. These Turkish baths closed in 2008, though some of the rooms are now used for other purposes.

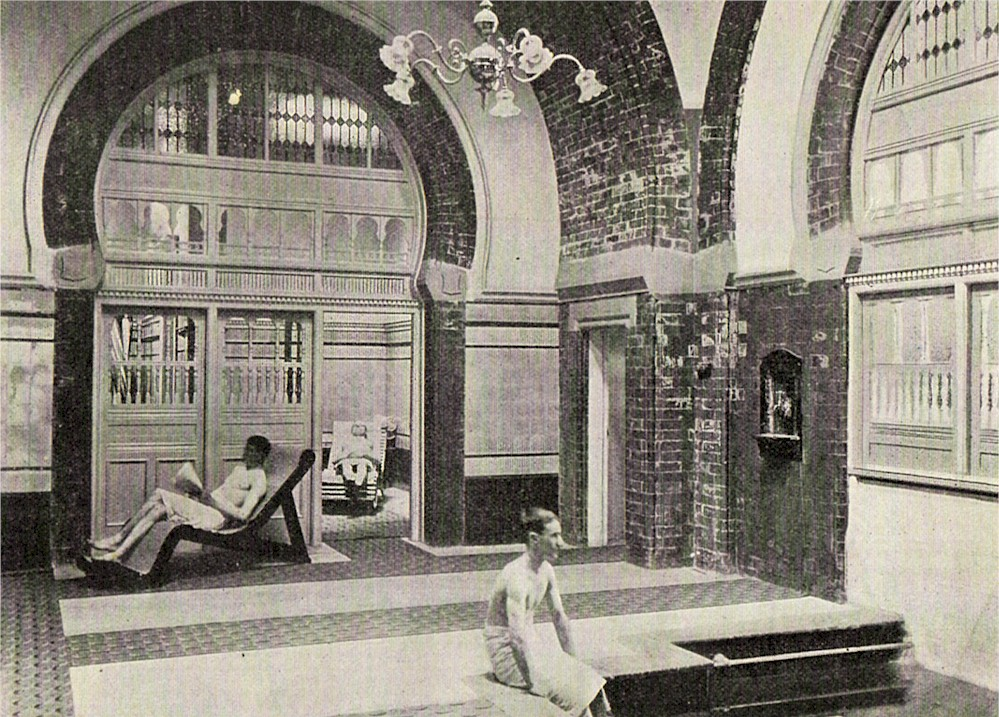
Portobello cool room

Edinburgh citizens had to wait until 1901 for their corporation to build its only Turkish baths, part of the large Portobello public baths building facing the sea. These baths currently remain open. Finally, at the other end of the provision scale, Glasgow Corporation included a small Turkish baths for eight bathers in its Gallowgate Public Baths in 1902. This was followed by larger ones in the Govanhill baths in 1917, and in three other baths—Pollokshaws, Shettleston, and Whiteinch, all in 1926. Although there were two classes of hot water baths, all the corporation's Turkish baths were built for a single class of user, unlike those in England and Wales where the Public Baths and Wash-houses Acts mandated two classes, their relative sizes, and their charges.

==== Wales ====
The earliest Welsh Turkish baths were small, opening in 1861 in Brecon and Tredegar, although it is not clear which of the two opened first. A local newspaper suggests that it was in Tredegar where a former collier, Daniel Jones, built a bath in part of his home and made it available to locals suffering from rheumatism and infections of the chest. But a couple of months later there is a detailed account of a visit to the Turkish bath at an unnamed location in Brecon, staffed by a Mr Davies and owned by Dr Williams who is described as 'the pioneer in the Principality'.

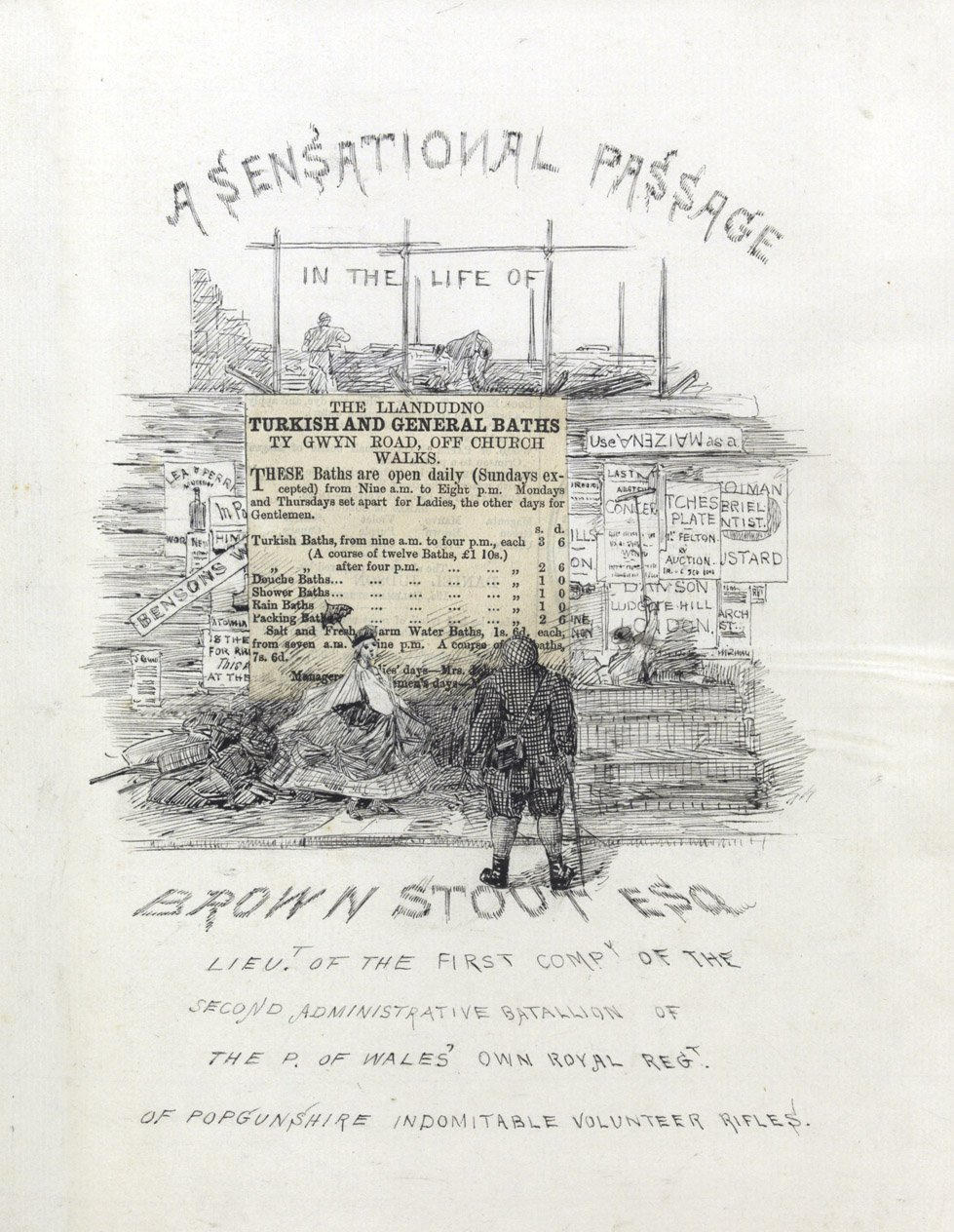
A sensational passage

Neither of these baths seems to have survived for long. But the following year, 1862, saw the opening of a major Turkish bath in Cardiff and within a few years this was followed by baths at Merthyr Tydfil (1866), Llandudno, Neath, and Newport (all in 1864), and others as the century moved on. While some of the smaller Welsh baths may not have remained open for very long, the Llandudno bath during its three-year life managed to inspire Richard Greene, a local artist and writer, to produce an amusing series of sketches which became part of a manuscript book on the attractions and amusements of Llandudno.

=== Early Victorian Turkish baths outside the United Kingdom ===
==== Australia ====
In 1858, Dr John Le Gay Brereton, father of the Australian poet and critic of the same name, was visiting physician at the FAC Turkish baths in Bradford's Leeds Road, one of the first in England. In 1859 he emigrated to Australia, almost immediately taking a lease on Captain Cook's Hotel in Spring Street, Sydney, and converting it into a Turkish bath. The baths comprised a cooling-room, two hot rooms, and showers, which latter devices were so unusual they needed to be described by the reporter covering the opening of the baths.

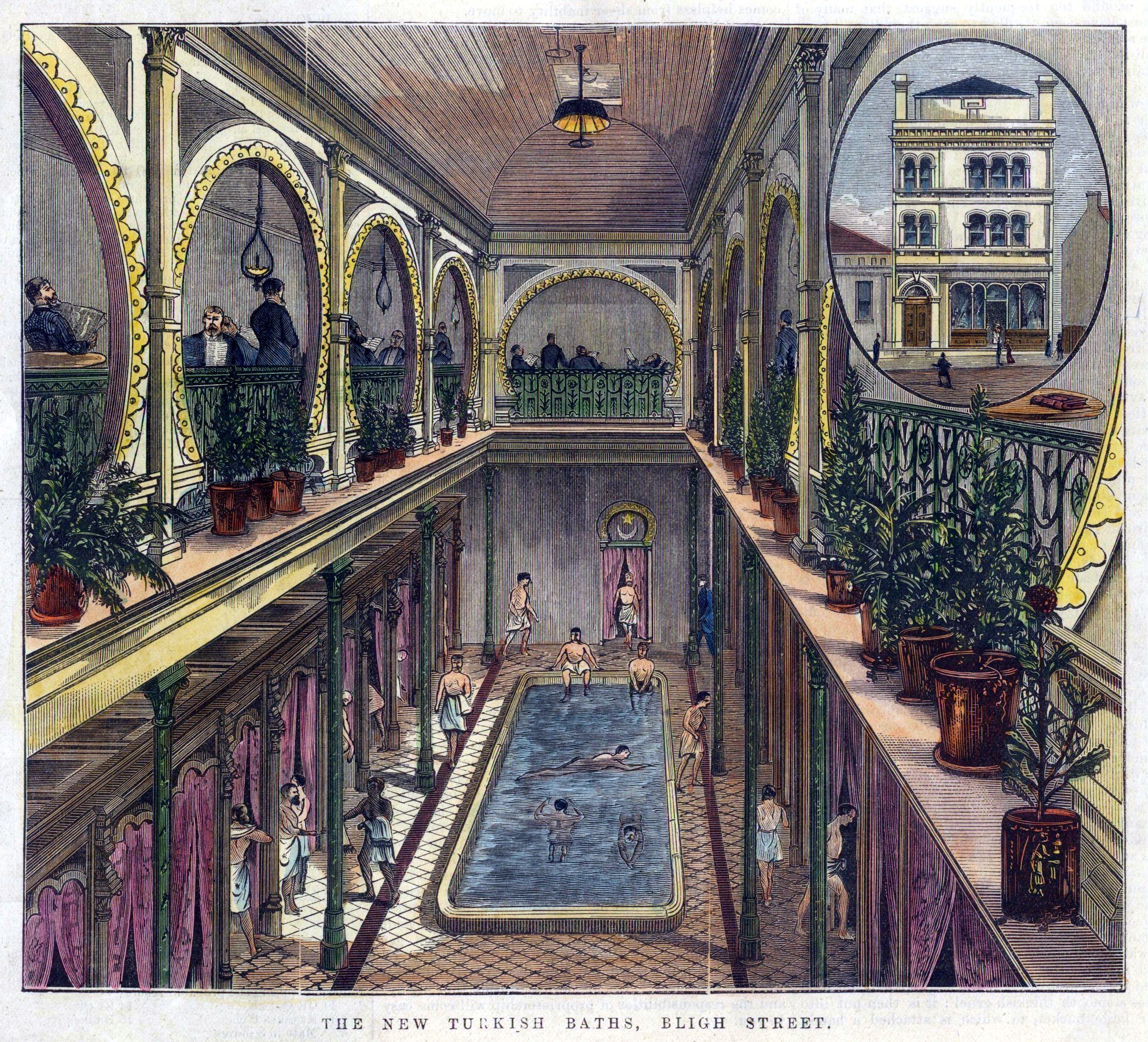
Bligh Street rebuilt in 1884

This was not only the first Victorian Turkish bath to be built in one of the British colonies, but it opened a few months before the first bath in London, capital of the Empire. The venture was successful, over 4,000 baths being taken during the first nine months, and plans were already being drawn up for the much larger establishment which opened on 16 March 1861 in Bligh Street. Melbourne's first Turkish bath opened in Lonsdale Street in 1860, and by the end of the 1860s there were baths in all the major Australian cities, including Hobart in Tasmania.

==== New Zealand ====
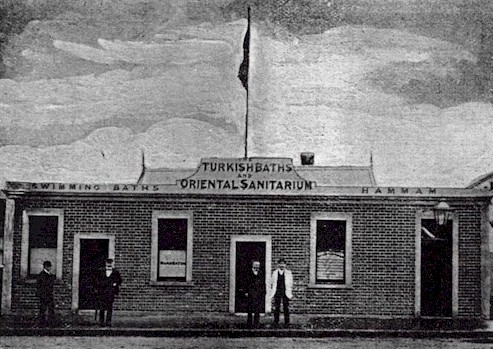
Otago Turkish baths, Dunedin

New Zealand's first Victorian Turkish bath was set up by the Otago Turkish Bath Company in a converted biscuit factory in Moray Place, Dunedin. Opening in December 1874, it comprised a cooling-room, two hot rooms, a shampooing room and a tepid water swimming pool. Later Turkish baths opened in several locations including Auckland, Christchurch, Nelson, and Wellington.

==== Canada ====
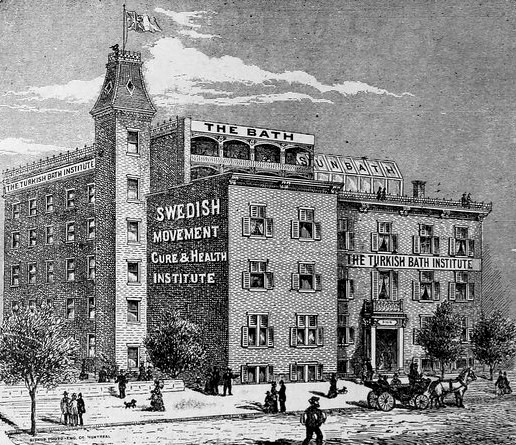
Turkish Bath Hotel after 1885 extensions

In Canada the chronology is less clear. The first large Victorian Turkish bath opened in 1869 in the French-speaking city of Montreal at McBean's Turkish Bath Hotel in Monique Street, although there may have been a smaller establishment in Joté Street as early as 1863. The baths were refurbished on several occasions and were still in operation in 1911. Many of the larger cities had at least one Turkish bath during the following decades, with the English-speaking cities, Toronto, Vancouver, and Victoria each having several.

==== United States of America ====
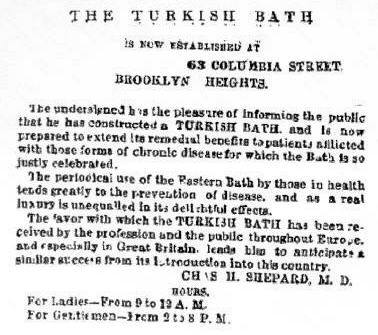
1st US Turkish bath

David Urquhart's influence was also felt outside the Empire when in 1861, Charles H Shepard opened the first Turkish baths in the United States at 63 Columbia Street, Brooklyn Heights, NY, most probably on 3 October 1863. It was not a purpose-built establishment, but Shepard added a four-room Turkish bath to his three-storey hydropathic establishment. This was so successful that he had to enlarge it within ten months. Three years later, a new set of baths was opened next door and the original baths were converted for use by women. When Shepard's bath opened, Brooklyn was not yet part of New York City, so the city's first Turkish bath, opened in 1865 by Drs Eli P Miller and A L Wood, was in Manhattan at 13 Laight Street.

Like Urquhart, Shepard was an enthusiastic advocate for the bath, writing several pamphlets, and campaigning for a publicly funded one for the poor. By the end of the 19th century, Victorian Turkish baths had spread across the United States just as they had done in the British Isles, and were to be found in at least thirty-one of the country's then forty-five states. Alaska, Montana, New Jersey, North Dakota, and Texas are known to have had several each after the beginning of the 20th century.

==== France ====
The first Victorian Turkish bath in France was opened in 1868 by Dr Charles Depraz at Place Grimaldi in Nice. Though known as the Hammam de Nice, Depraz wrote that it followed the pattern of the many perfect baths in England ( 'La distribution de cet établissement a été faite d'après les plans les plus parfaits des nombreux Hammams de l'Angleterre ') The title page of the guide indicates that Depraz was the promoter of a company called Hammams de France, and by 1870 there was already a second establishment, the Hammam de Lyon.

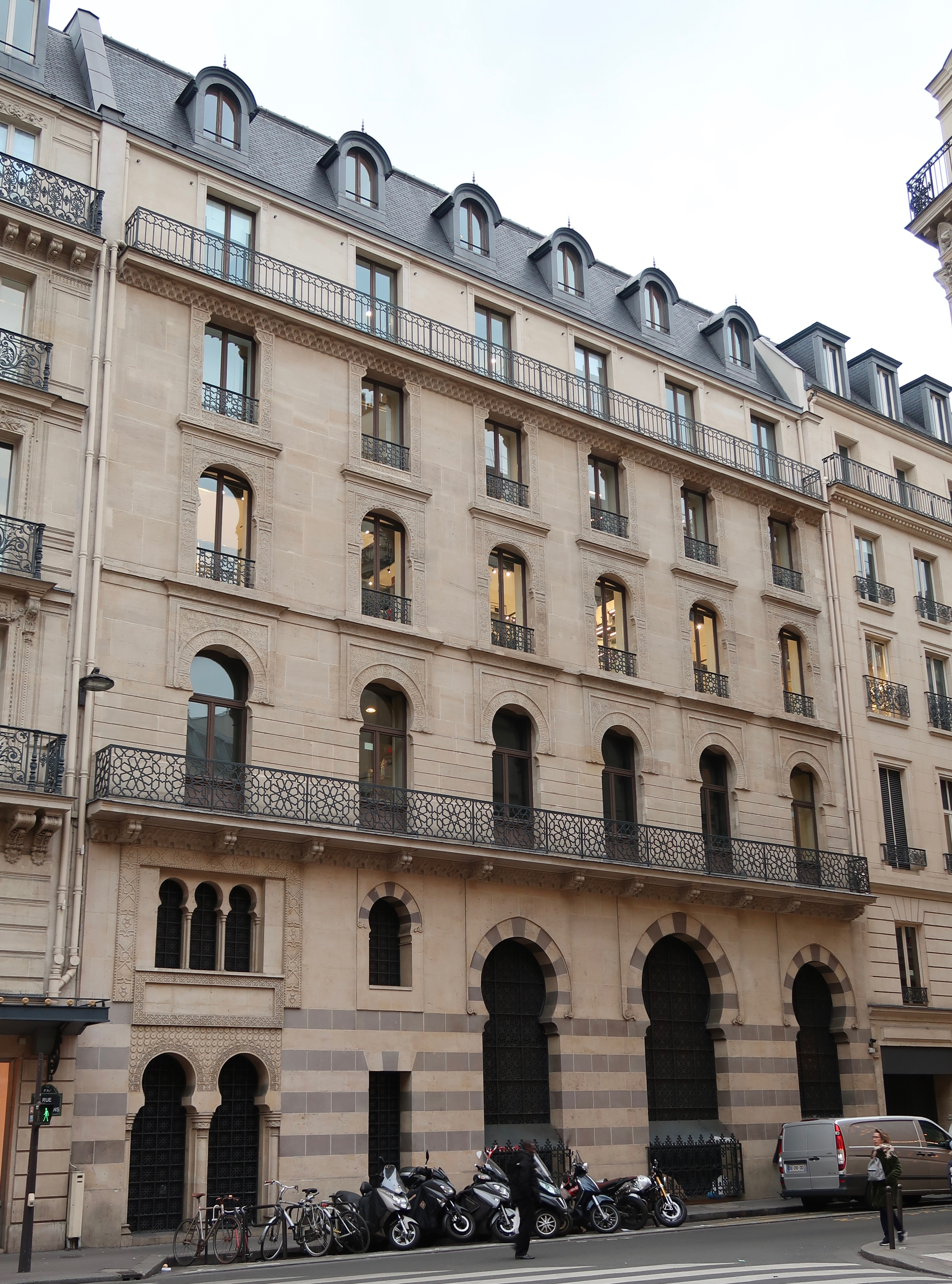
18 rue des Mathurins, Paris

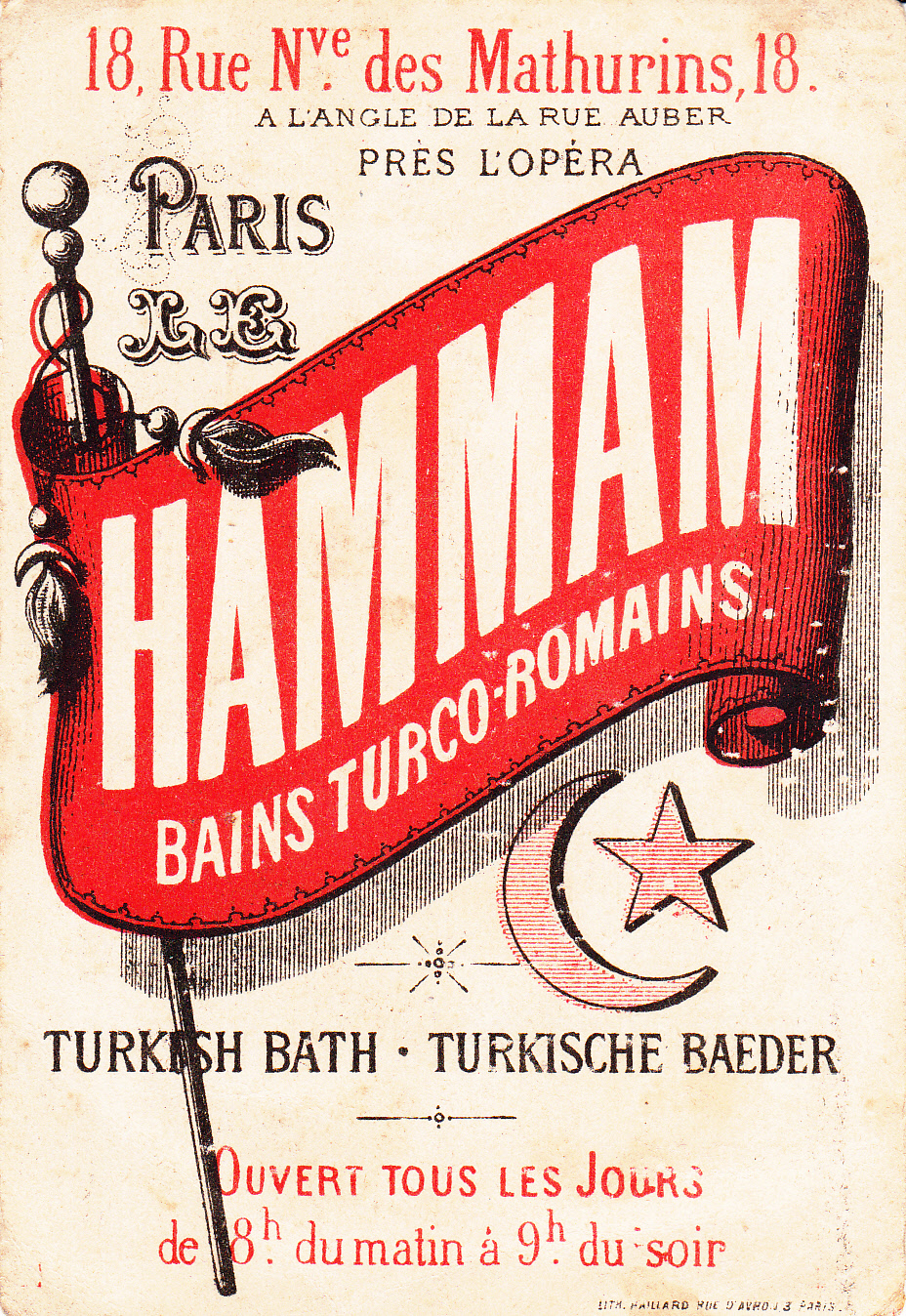
Advertising card

The first Victorian Turkish bath in Paris opened to the public in March 1876 on the junction of the Rue Neuve des Mathurins and the Rue Auber. The majority of its patrons were men, but certain specific times were set aside for women, who entered through a discreet entrance at 47 Boulevard Haussmann, round the corner. Though called the Paris Hammam, Nebahat Avcıoğlu has convincingly argued that not only was it influenced by baths in Britain, but especially by Urquhart's Jermyn Street baths, opened fourteen years earlier. Designed in a lavish style by architects William Klein and Albert Duclos, the baths included a swimming pool, restaurant and a hairdresser. That shampooing was undertaken by two Englishmen trained at the Jermyn Street baths reinforced the idea that the baths were designed to attract members of the local and international high society. In this it succeeded, its regular bathers including Léon Gambetta, Georges-Eugène Haussmann, the Prince of Wales, the Baron de Rothschild, and many of those famous in the world of the arts. It remained open until 1954 before being converted into offices. Today only the façade remains, with its numerous westernised horseshoe windows, arches, and grilles.

==== Germany ====
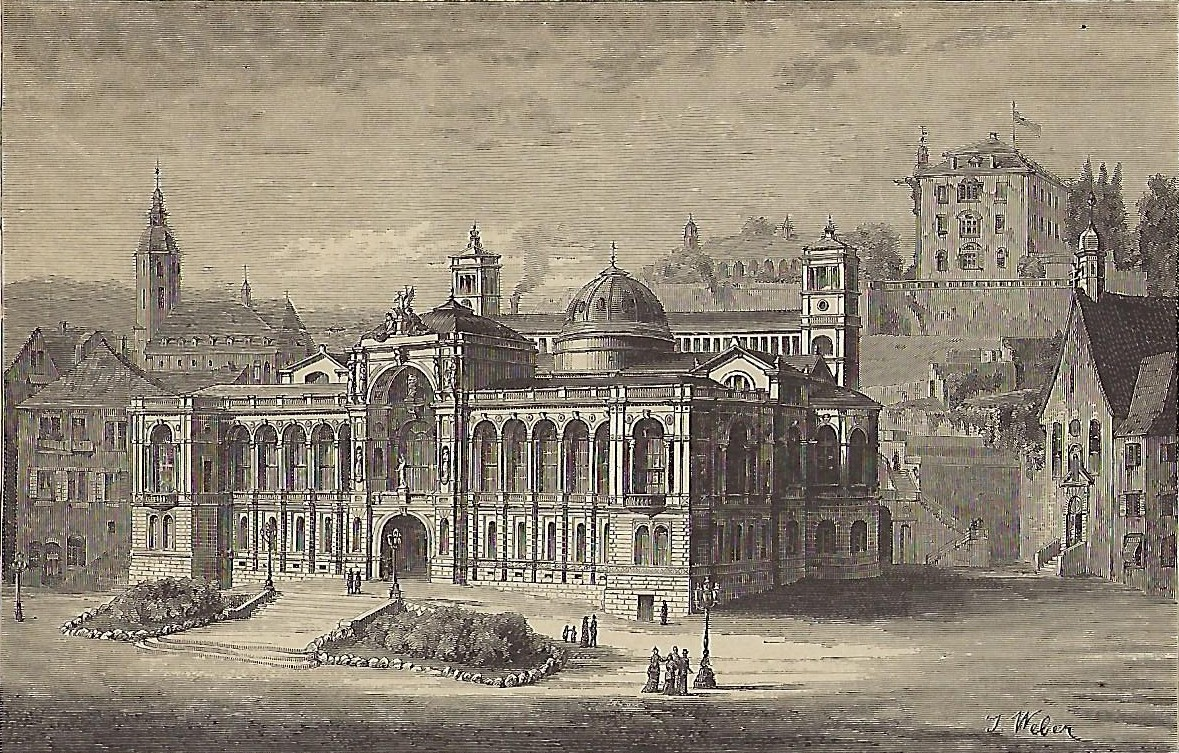
Baden-Baden Friedrichsbad 1879

It is not known which Victorian Turkish bath was the first in Germany, but the first of any size and importance was the Friedrichsbad in Baden-Baden, opened soon after the Paris Hammam. Grand Duke Frederic of Baden had originally wanted a spa grand enough to compete with others ensuring that, in their use of the hot waters, the baths 'should surpass those known hitherto, and be in accordance with all the requirements of modern balneo-therapeutics'.

Planning started in 1867 but work was delayed by water supply problems and the Franco-Prussian War (1870–71). District-Architect Karl Dernfeld and the spa's medical officer Carl Frech took time to visit other baths in Germany and elsewhere to help them develop their plan. When the baths opened on 15 December 1877, the original spa had been complemented by a luxurious set of what was unashamedly called Roman-Irish baths with appropriate credit being given to Dr Barter. The Frederic Baths, together with others in Munich and Wiesbaden (opened in 1901 and 1913 respectively) are still open, and have also become tourist attractions in their own right.

== Ownership of the baths ==
Victorian Turkish baths were provided for the general public by individual entrepreneurs, limited liability companies, and local authorities. Exact percentages of the different types cannot be determined since it is impossible to know how many such baths have existed. But one survey of nearly 500 baths known (in 2012) to have existed in the British Isles suggests that around 70% were owned by individuals, partnerships, or closed companies; 12% by public companies; and 18% by local authorities.

=== Baths owned independently ===
The majority of Victorian Turkish baths were owned by individuals, partnerships, or small private companies. Many, like most of those opened by FAC members, were run by the owner and members of his family. Owners were predominantly men, and of the few women proprietors, the overwhelming majority were the widows or legatees of the original owner.

Running a family establishment was hard work. But the bath might have been converted from part of the family home, or a small family shop, so expenses were lower. When well run, such baths stood a greater chance of success than one owned by a company which employed less committed poorly waged workers.

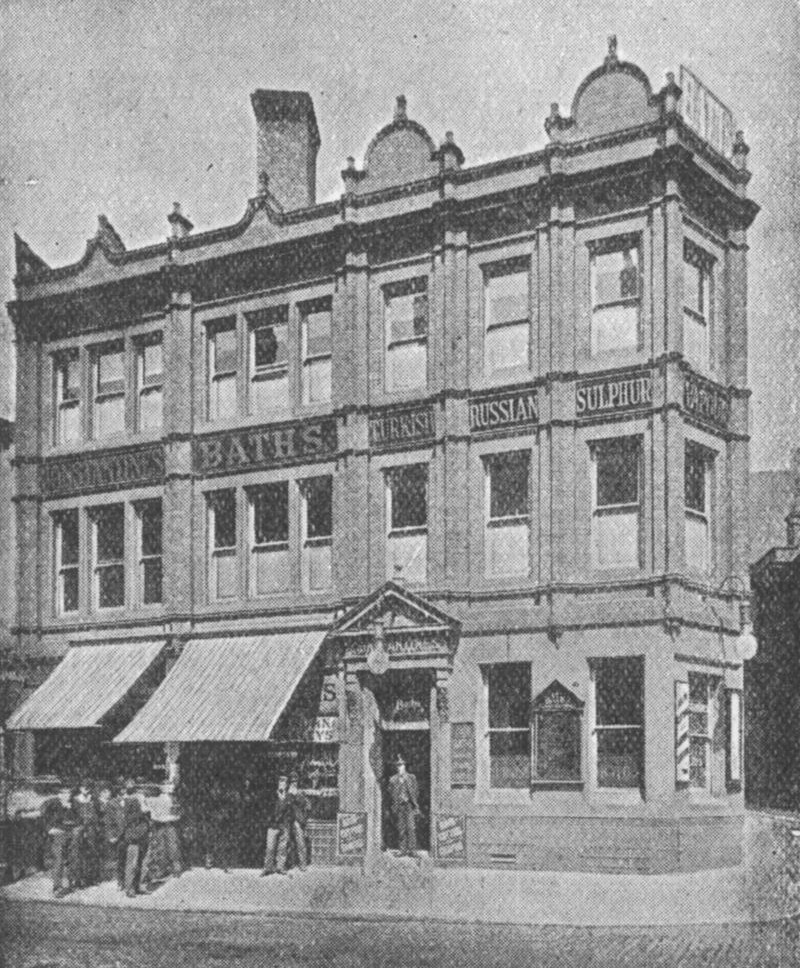
Constantines new baths, 1895

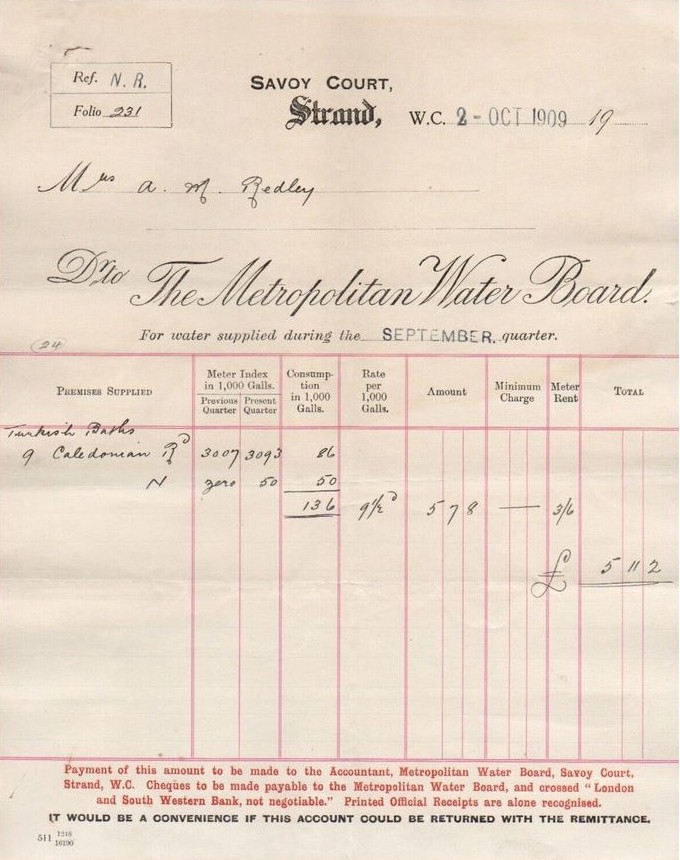
Water bill King's Cross Turkish Baths

Not all baths were started from scratch. Joseph Constantine, a Manchester hydropathist (currently known as a hydrotherapist), was one of several already running established businesses which provided ordinary hot and cold water baths. Being close to the FAC's first Turkish baths in England, he very quickly added them to his own establishment, and, later advocated their use in his books on hydropathy (known as hydrotherapy in current practice).

Baths run by individuals or partnerships were also more likely to have a longer life than those run by companies, being easier to sell on to a new owner. The King's Cross Turkish Baths in Caledonian Road, London, for example, had four proprietors between 1870 and 1912 when the fifth, William Cooper, put it together with others to form a company, Savoy Turkish Baths Ltd. It survived in this form until it was closed by the company in 1921.

The first bath owners would rarely have had any previous experience of running one, and learnt on the job. But after a while some managers, and even bath attendants, would aspire to own a bath themselves. Few had the resources to buy one or expected to be able to get a bank loan. But some succeeded, as did Albert Samwell who, frustrated at the way the owner marketed his bath, took it over and greatly improved its income.

=== Baths owned by public companies ===
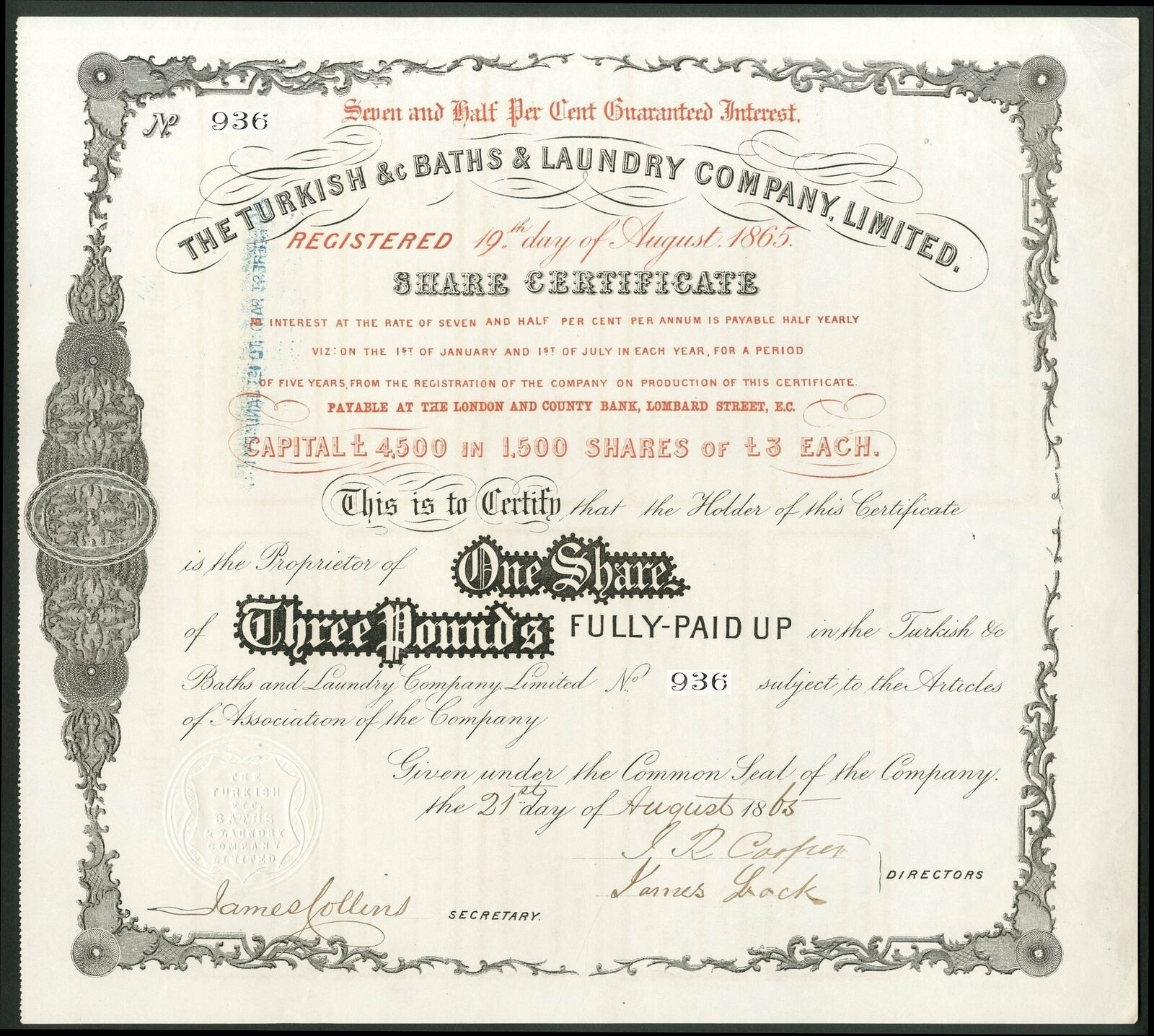
The Turkish &c Baths & Laundry Company Limited share certificate No.936

The Limited Liability Act 1855 made it relatively easy for companies to be formed in order to purchase established baths or build new ones, but making them profitable was more difficult.

The destruction of Irish company records during the 1922–23 Civil War makes it impossible to gain a full picture of how baths companies fared in the British Isles as a whole. But the survival rate of 68 English companies was not high, fewer than half surviving longer than ten years. Only three survived more than 40 years, the longest lasting being the 80 year old London & Provincial Turkish Bath Co Ltd, whose Jermyn Street Hammam in central London closed at the start of World War II.

Companies had often failed to properly undertake research to determine whether their area could support a baths establishment. The Liquidator of the St Leonards-on-Sea company, for example, offering their Turkish baths for sale after five years, emphasised alternative uses for the building, rather than suggesting that it be continued as baths.

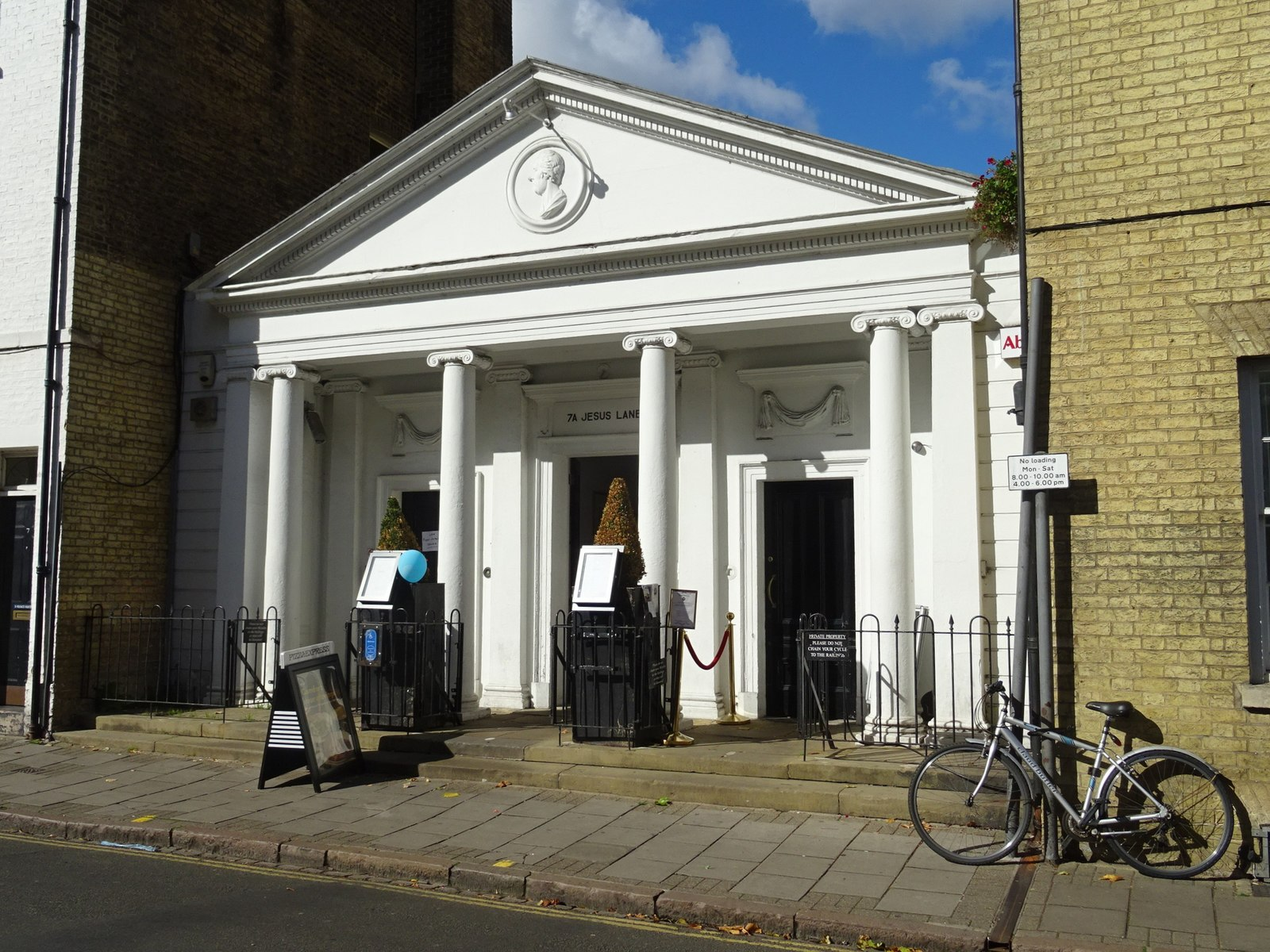
The Roman Baths building in Cambridge, 2017

Lack of such research could lead to under-capitalisation when not enough shares were taken up before the baths opened, or building work commenced. It was not unknown for share offer advertisements to indicate that their offer was almost fully subscribed when this was far from the truth. The Roman Bath Company's baths in Jesus Lane, Cambridge, remained open for less than a year leaving many unanswered questions about the money actually raised and how it was spent.

There were exceptions when having only a small number of shareholders had not been a disadvantage. The 500 £10 shares of the Leicester Turkish Bath Co Ltd were fully taken up by just 53 shareholders. Thirty years later, when the company sold its baths, there were only 24 shareholders remaining, but all 500 shares were still being held between them.

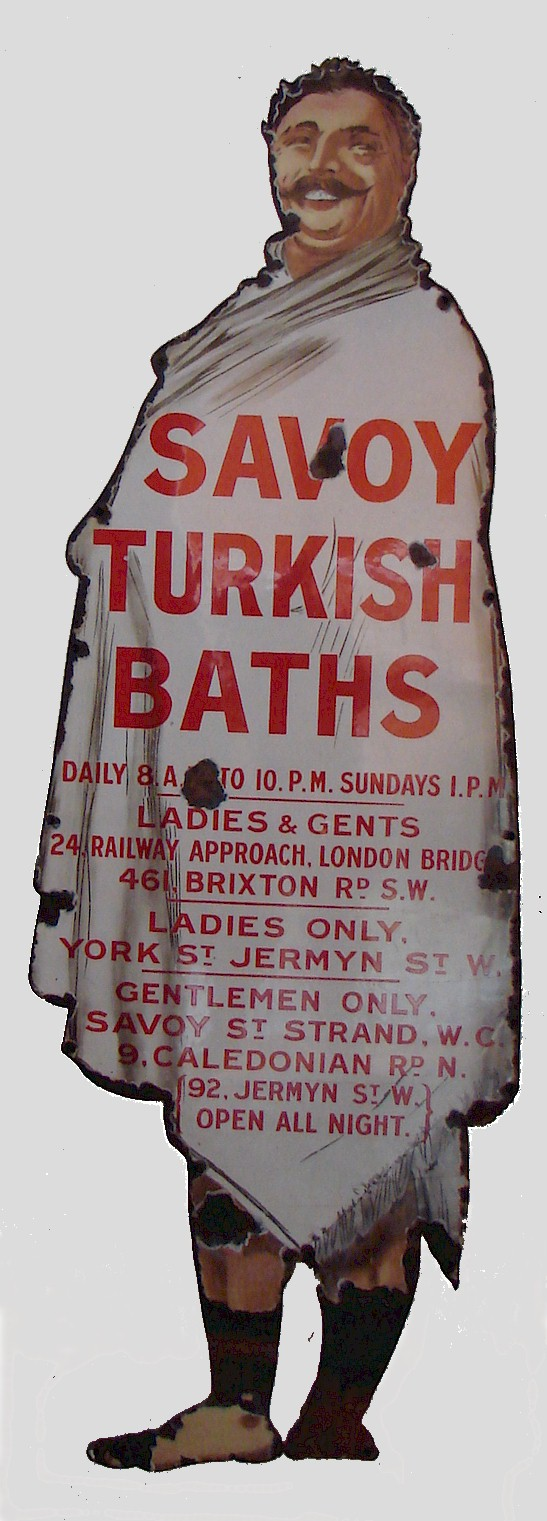
Savoy sign

Only two companies, Nevill's Turkish Baths Ltd and Savoy Turkish Baths Ltd, had anything approaching a chain of baths, each owning nine establishments, all in London. The only other chain of any size was Bartholomew's with seven establishments spread between Eastbourne and Manchester. (Note: These were located at Bristol, Manchester, Worcester, Birmingham, Bath, London, and Eastbourne) These were not owned by a company, however, but by Charles Bartholomew, who had been a member of Urquhart's Bristol FAC.

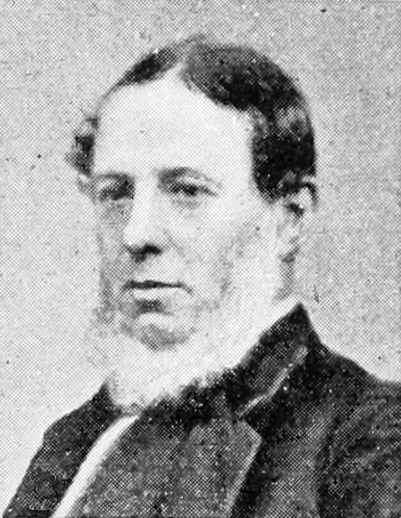
James Smithies

One publicly owned Turkish bath was unique in that it was not owned by a limited liability company. In March 1857, James Smithies, one of the original Rochdale Pioneers and newly elected Chair of the Rochdale FAC, called a meeting of those wishing to subscribe to a new society proposing to build a Turkish bath. By July, Smithies had been elected secretary of the new Rochdale Subscription Turkish Bath Society, and on 14 November their new co-operatively owned bath opened in School Lane. Ownership remained in this form until 1881 when it was decided to restructure the society to take advantage of changes in the law which now offered co-operators the protection of limited liability. The baths closed in 1891 shortly after Rochdale Corporation opened its refurbished Smith Street baths, with its own Turkish baths suite.

=== Local authority provision of Turkish baths ===
The cholera epidemics of the first half of the 19th century described by Anthony Wohl sparked urgent calls for sanitary reform and state involvement in public health.^{:pp. 140–141} Emphasis began to be placed on preventative measures leading to the Public Baths and Wash-houses Acts of 1846 and 1847. The acts were not mandatory but only permissive, allowing local authorities in England and Wales to use public funds to provide wash-houses (known as 'steamies') where people could launder their clothes, hot and cold water baths (slipper baths), cabinet vapour baths, and swimming pools (though at first only outdoor pools were permitted).

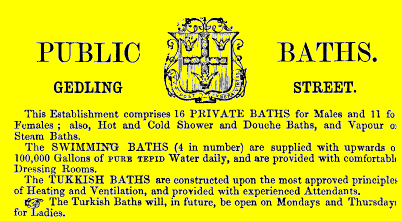
Nottingham Wright directory 1862

Nottingham Corporation was the first local authority to host a Turkish bath, in June 1861. However, it was not provided by them directly but by the lessee of their swimming baths, William Richards, who built them at his own expense in response to a 105 signature petition to the corporation. The second local authority bath was opened in Bury in May 1864. This was not council commissioned either, but started by a public company. It was taken over by the town's Commissioners of Baths and Wash-houses, after building had started, when the company failed to raise enough funds to continue.

Bradford was the first local authority to initiate the building of a Turkish bath. This opened in 1867 with a cooling-room furnished with eight cubicles, each with a damask curtain over the entrance and a couch inside. It is not known how many hot rooms there were, or what other facilities were available apart from a shampooing room. Bradford continued providing Turkish baths for 120 years, the longest lasting continuous provision by any local authority.

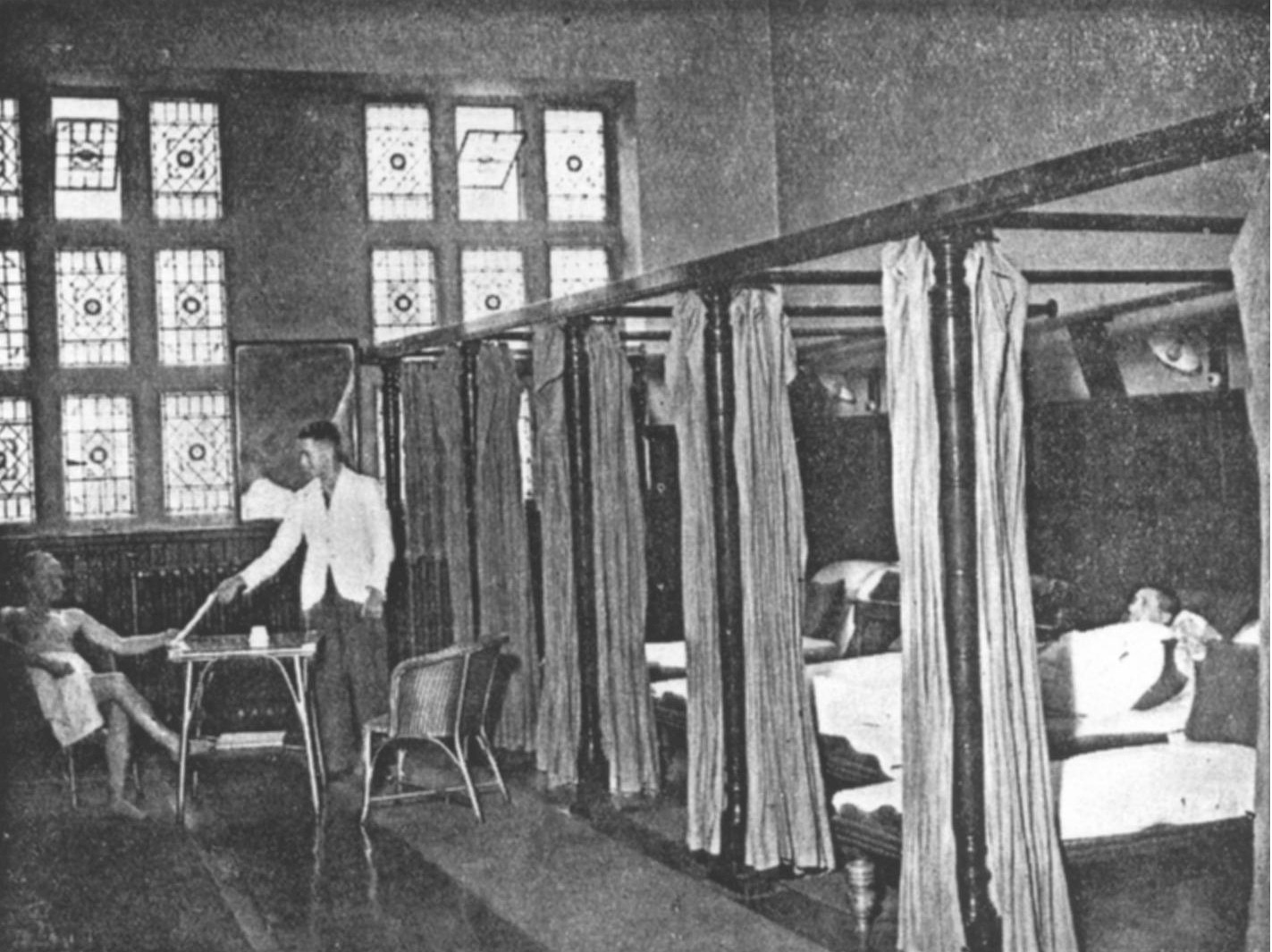
Newport, Wales, after 1923 refurb

The first municipal bath in Wales opened as part of Newport's public baths in 1890 and remained the only one until the 1950s. Designed by the Borough Engineer, Conyers Kirby, it comprised three hot rooms, a shampooing room, plunge pool, and a large cooling-room. The baths employed a superintendent and his wife (to supervise the women's baths) who were paid 35s per week with residence, coal and gas. An 'Engineer, boilerman and stoker' was paid 30s per week, and male, female, and boy attendants 21s, 15s, and 6s respectively. These latter wages contrasted unfavourably with the cost of a first-class bath (2s) and a second-class bath (1s, on Saturdays only). The baths, regularly upgraded, remained open till 1985.

Different legislation relating to the provision of Turkish baths applied in Scotland and Ireland. Nevertheless, Paisley (the first in Scotland) and Kilkenny (the only one in Ireland) were among the eight local authorities to open them between 1867 and 1875.

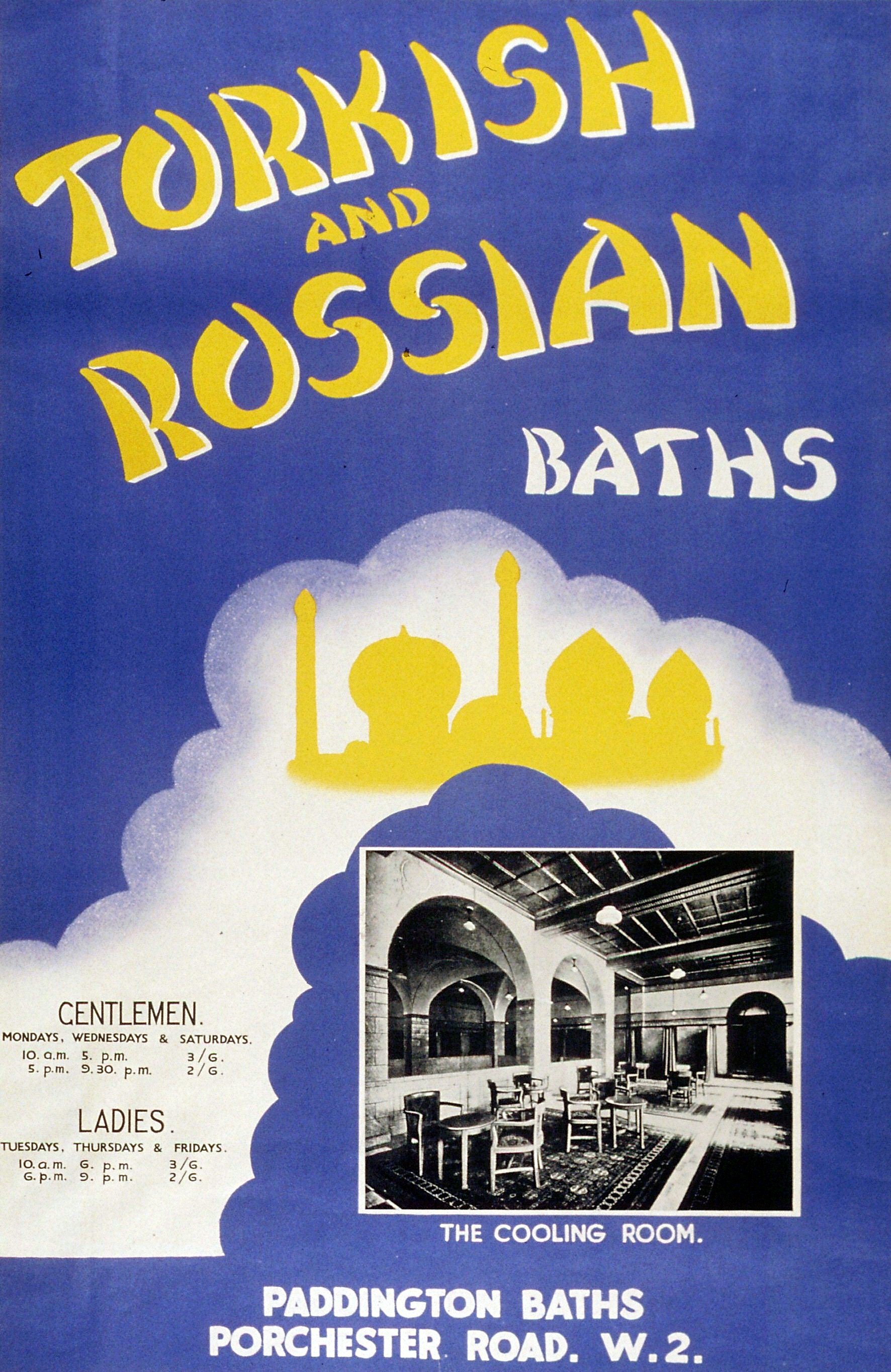
Paddington Baths

Provision of municipal Turkish baths did not spread round the country as fast as might have been expected after the Baths and Wash-houses Acts. First they were not mandatory and this gave councillors the opportunity to turn down requests for other than financial reasons. For, as reported in one local paper, 'the statement that [Warrington] workingmen want Turkish baths may be dismissed as idle nonsense.' Second, there was often advice given by a Town Clerk or other legal adviser, as at the Paddington Vestry, that while vapour baths were permitted under the acts, Turkish baths were not. But others argued that this was only because when the Acts were passed there were no Turkish baths.

Nottingham and Bury, as noted above, clearly ignored this situation and, increasingly, places in the provinces followed suit. Some were extra wary, like Southampton calling them "vapour baths", or Birmingham by initially calling them "hot-air lavatories". Yet it was not until 1905 that the Borough of Camberwell became the first London borough to build Turkish baths.

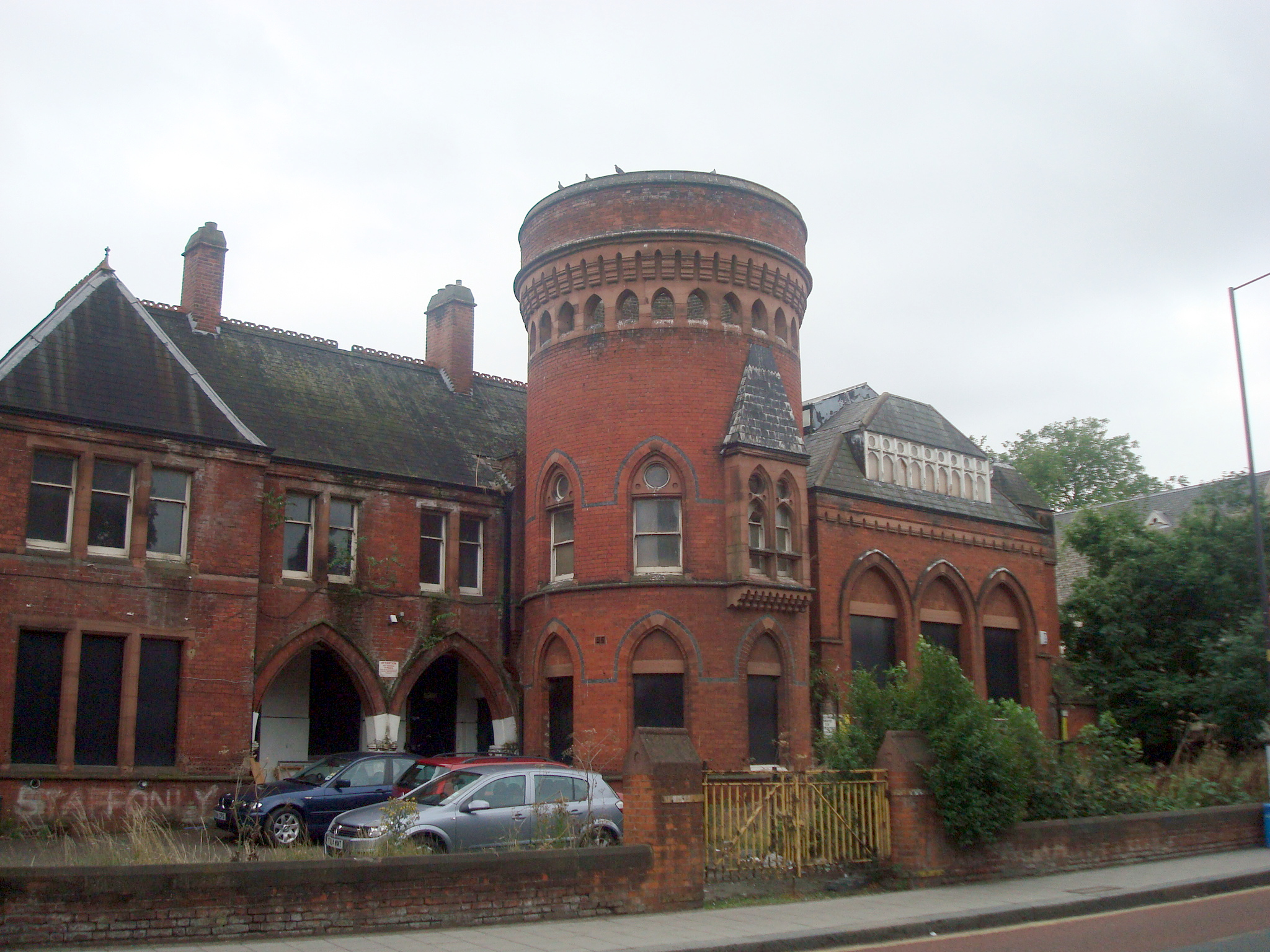
Home of the Lewisham Turkish baths, 1965–2002

By 1900, there were already over forty municipal Turkish baths in the provinces and none had been prosecuted. In London, a long gap followed Camberwell and then, between 1927 and 1938, a further nine were built, followed by Lewisham in 1965. For style, or the quality of their fittings, few of the later London baths matched Camberwell. But the latter all had three hot rooms, a cooling-room with changing cubicles, a shampooing room, plunge pool, and complementary Russian steam bath. All were within the local public baths near the swimming pools. As occurred throughout the country, when the pools became outdated and needed replacing, most Turkish baths gave way to saunas and steam rooms, the only exceptions being Edinburgh, Newcastle upon Tyne, Harrogate, Northampton, Swindon, and the London boroughs of Islington, Tower Hamlets, and the City of Westminster, all of whose Turkish baths are safely within listed buildings.

== Victorian Turkish baths designed for specific user groups ==
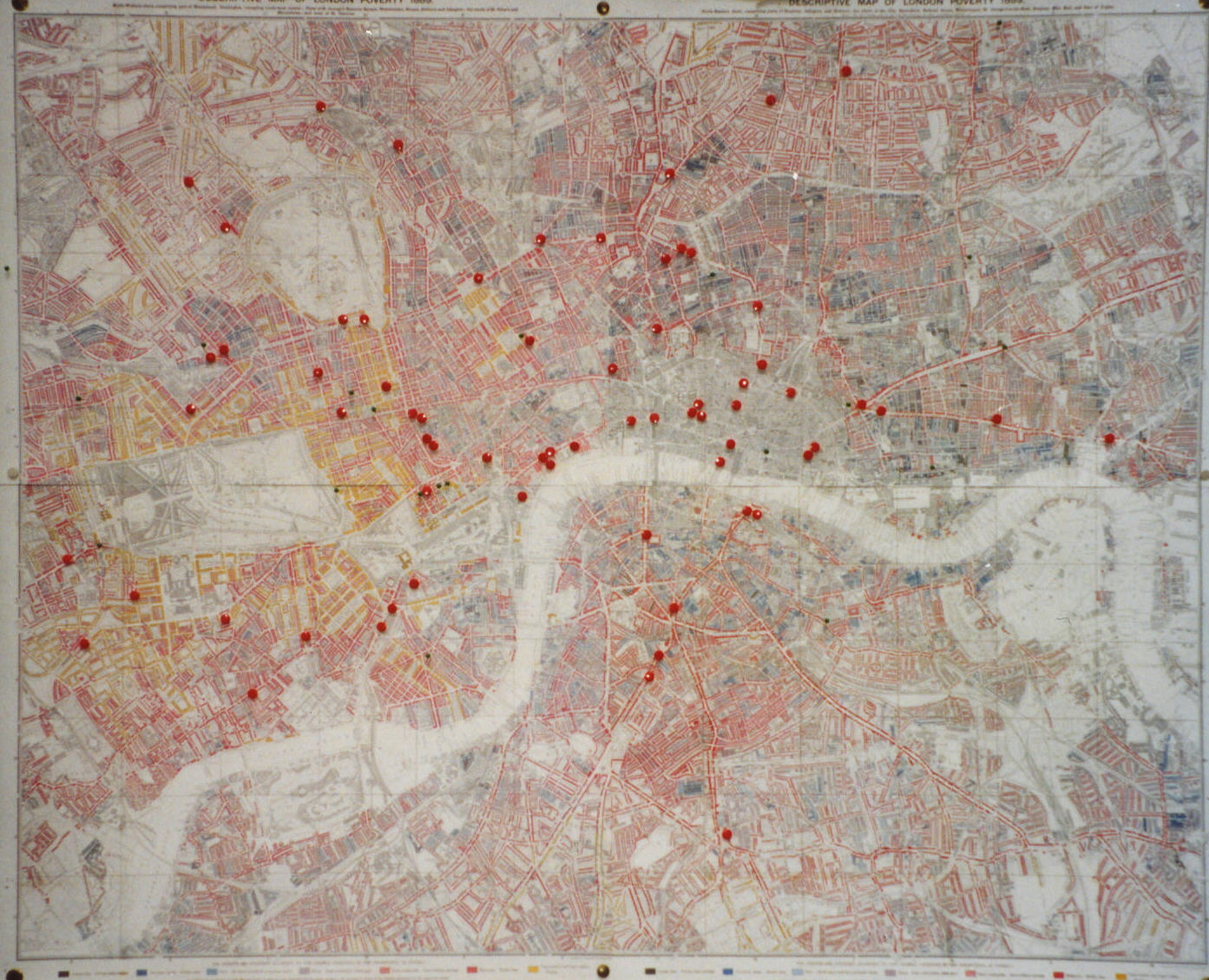
Booth Poverty Map of London with Turkish Bath locations superimposed

Although the main purpose of the Baths and Wash-houses Acts was to encourage the provision of washing and laundering facilities for those who neither had them nor could afford them, the early Turkish baths were commercial ventures rather than municipal ones because the acts were not mandatory. It has been shown, by plotting the location of London's baths on Booth's Poverty Map, that there was a tendency for the majority of baths to be opened in the better off areas which needed them least. A number of attempts were made to ameliorate this situation.

Other categories of bather were constrained by location, either necessarily or by choice, and these were also catered for, including those in hospitals and asylums. Although an American prison is reported to have had a Turkish bath, they were not provided in prisons in the United Kingdom, though some thought this would be beneficial.

For wealthier bathers, Turkish baths were available in hotels, hydros and 'members only' clubs. Those travelling by sea could find them on ocean liners, while those preferring to stay at home could have their own baths designed and built for them.

Although animals formed a quite different category of bather, Turkish baths were also provided for farm animals and urban workhorses.

=== Victorian Turkish baths for the working class and the poor ===
Both Barter and Urquhart made free of charge provision for their staff to use a Turkish bath—Barter, in one built specifically for workers on the St Ann's estate, and Urquhart, by allowing his domestic servants to use his own bath.

In 1859, when Barter's first public bath opened in Grenville Place, Cork, the charge was two shillings during the day, and half price from six o'clock till ten o'clock, morning and evening, with shampoos sixpence extra. But even a shilling was far too expensive for most people.

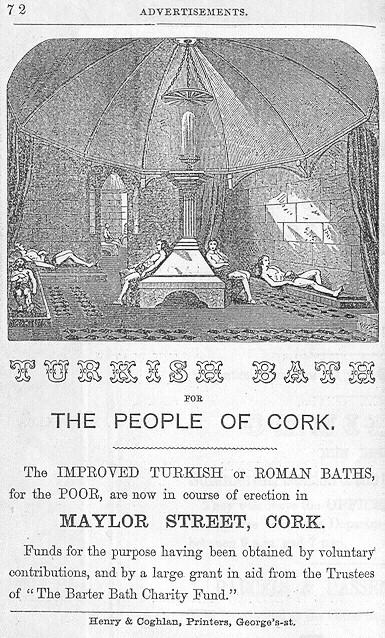
Maylor Street, Cork, advert left hand page

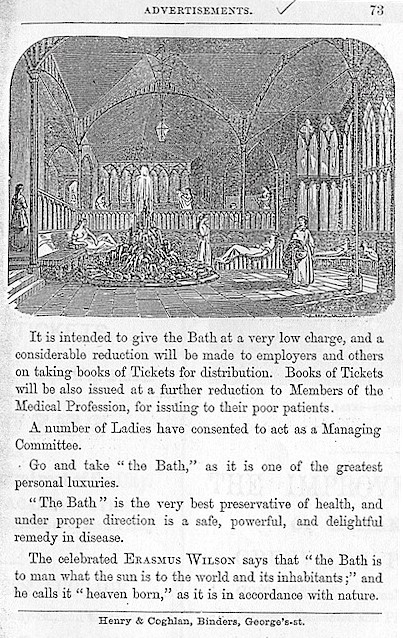
Maylor Street, Cork, advert right hand page

The following year Barter set up Working Class Turkish Baths in Belfast under a manager, Thomas Coakley. It was located, with its own entrance, at the back of First Class baths, then still under construction. But a working-class bath still cost sixpence or ninepence, and the baths got off to a slow start. Nevertheless, three years later, in 1863, Barter opened a second similar establishment, the Turkish Baths for the Destitute Poor (known as The People's Turkish Baths) in Maylor Street, Cork. This was partly financed by an initial charitable appeal. Once open, Turkish baths became available for a penny or twopence and, in some cases—usually after a doctor's recommendation—free of charge

Dr Barter died in 1870 and his son, also named Richard, took over St Ann's and his various Turkish bath interests. In 1872, despite poor results in Belfast where Coakley reported that the baths were not even covering expenses, Mr Barter opened The People's Turkish Baths in Thomas's Lane, Dublin. Here the cost was sixpence, These seem to have performed better, and the charge was still the same twenty years later.

No long-lasting Turkish baths set up along these lines is known outside Ireland, though Richard Metcalfe ran one for about eighteen months some time around 1861 in Notting Hill, London. Members of the Rescue Society (later renamed the Temperance Society) had set up their first Workmen's Hall and Reading Rooms in Portland Terrace as an alternative to the public house. Metcalfe had been allotted space for a hydropathic dispensary and had converted part of it into a small Turkish bath, but it was not much used and was soon abandoned.

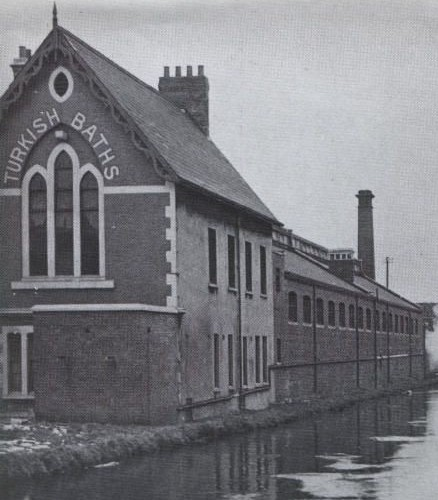
Cardiff Baths

In Wales there were no Turkish baths specifically for the poor, and the Cardiff Baths in Guildford Street charged 2s or 1s. Even the latter was too much for most women but the Cardiff Branch of the Ladies' Sanitary Association came to an arrangement with the baths company whereby the association could provide tickets to the women's sessions to 'deserving cases' at 'nominal prices'.

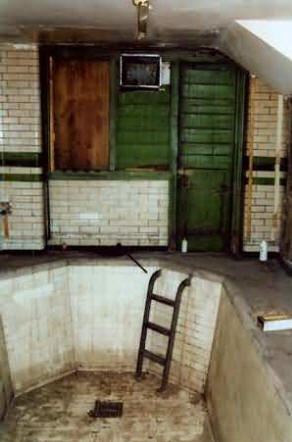
Wimbledon pool

In England, the approach was different again, with a number of companies providing Turkish baths for their employees. The smallest of these was the bath for the male employees of the Wimbledon Theatre, London, which was used between 1910 and the theatre's wartime closure. This is the only theatre known to have had such a bath.

In the 1860s, three large companies were in a different category altogether and each provided Turkish baths at low prices, not only for their workers, but for their families also. These were at Saltaire, a purpose-built village where Titus Salt built his alpaca mill, and in two railway towns, Crewe, home of the London & North Western Railway, and Swindon, home of the Great Western Railway. The baths at Swindon are still open (though closed for major refurbishment since 2023).

In Ireland there seems to have been more compassion than elsewhere for the very poor. Peter Higginbotham records five workhouses in the south of the island which had, on the advice of their medical officer, installed Turkish baths for their residents; in England the only one was in King's Lynn.

=== Victorian Turkish baths in hospitals and asylums ===
==== Hospitals ====
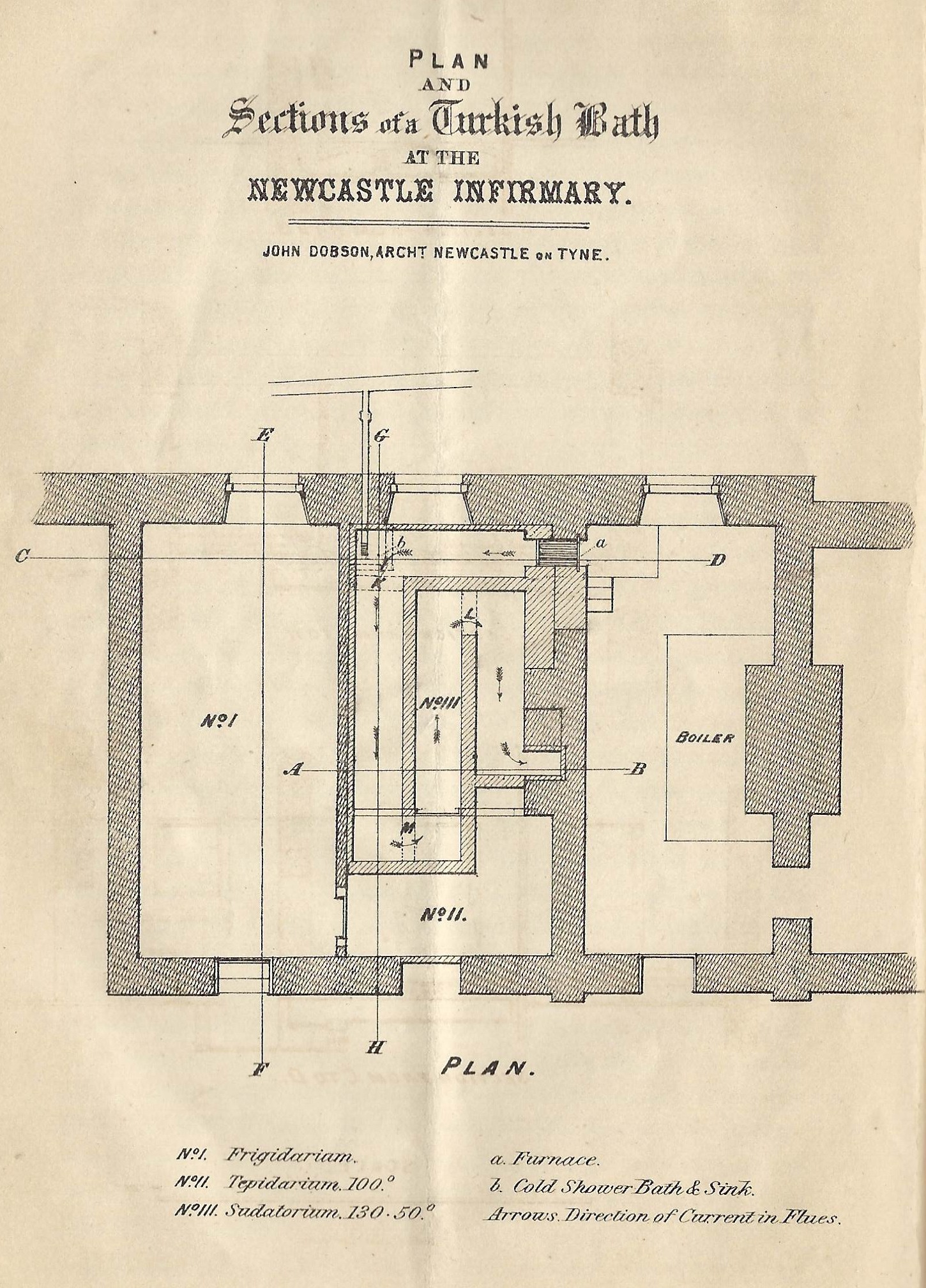
First Turkish bath in a hospital, John Dobson

In July 1858, less than a year after Urquhart opened England's first public Turkish bath in Manchester, a bath was opened in the Newcastle upon Tyne Infirmary—the first in any hospital. The Infirmary's House Committee, heavily influenced by Urquhart's political followers, George Crawshay and John Fife (a surgeon at the hospital and Crawshay's father-in-law), commissioned famous local architect John Dobson to design the bath.

So early in the development of the Turkish bath, Dobson had no body of professional expertise upon which to draw and, copying Barter, opted for a hypocaust for heating purposes. Although the temperatures were lower than in a commercial bath, the medical staff and the House Surgeon, Dr Andrew Bolton, were pleased with it. 11,891 baths had been given during its first year and it was noted that it been used without ill effect on patients with heart disease. The following year the number of bathers was not given as a total but split into three groups: in-patients (1,720), out-patients (1,778) and 'casuals' (9,489). These would probably have included members of staff and paying members of the public. It was stated to have been specially beneficial in cases 'of a rheumatic character'.

After a serious accident when a bather fell onto the hot floor, the hypocaust was quickly replaced by a system of hot air ducts around the walls and placed under the seating. This was also abandoned and replaced by a hot air circulation system devised by Dr Bolton's brother, Dr John Adams Bolton, for a Turkish bath he had opened in Leicester.

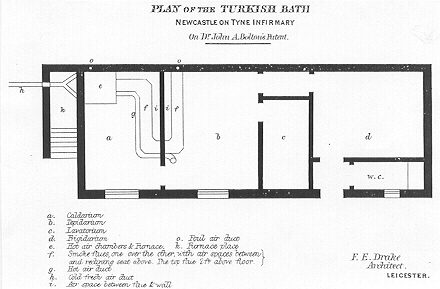
Plan of the third Turkish bath at Newcastle upon Tyne Infirmary, F E Drake, arch.

In his annual report for 1864, Dr Bolton stated that after a three-year trial the new air circulation system was 'superior in every respect' to the methods previously used, that the Turkish bath had been favourably received by the medical profession, and that it would soon be adopted by hospitals, asylums, and workhouses generally.

In this Bolton was over-optimistic. Nevertheless, large city hospitals in Belfast, Denbigh, Dublin, Huddersfield, Liverpool and London followed suit installing Turkish baths, the most recent being at the Royal Infirmary in Edinburgh in 1900. And as early as 1864, a bath was installed at the huge military hospital at Netley.

==== Asylums (Note: The terminology and institutional names appearing in this section reflect the usage of the times) ====
The close proximity of the Cork District Lunatic Asylum to St Ann's Hydro was a major factor influencing the building there of the first Turkish bath for asylum patients. The resident physician, Dr Thomas Power, had been impressed by the therapeutic results achieved at the hydro and in 1860, with Dr Barter's help, persuaded the asylum governors to install a bath there—a decision which needed approval by the Privy Council. Though not completed until February 1861, the bath was already in use the previous December.

After being prepared for two or three days beforehand under the supervision of Dr Barter and Inspector-General Hatchell of the Dublin Office of Lunatic Asylums, sixteen patients volunteered to use the bath. All enjoyed it and wanted to use it again. Though initially a simple single room bath—used at different times by men and women—a second hot room had been added by 1889, allowing both men and women to use the baths throughout the day.

Power's report to his governors in May noted that, since January, 124 patients had used the bath. Of these, ten had been discharged cured and another 52 had 'improved or were improving'. The medical journals pointed out that this was not a controlled experiment and the results should be treated with caution.

In his second report Power was more careful, writing that patients were now allowed more than one bath per week and that between fifty and eighty patients a day were currently using the bath, some for remedial purposes and a larger number for personal cleansing, but even the latter had resulted in healthier patients. This time The Lancet was more supportive, suggesting that Power's experience 'may well be recommended to the consideration of the managers of other public and private asylums.'

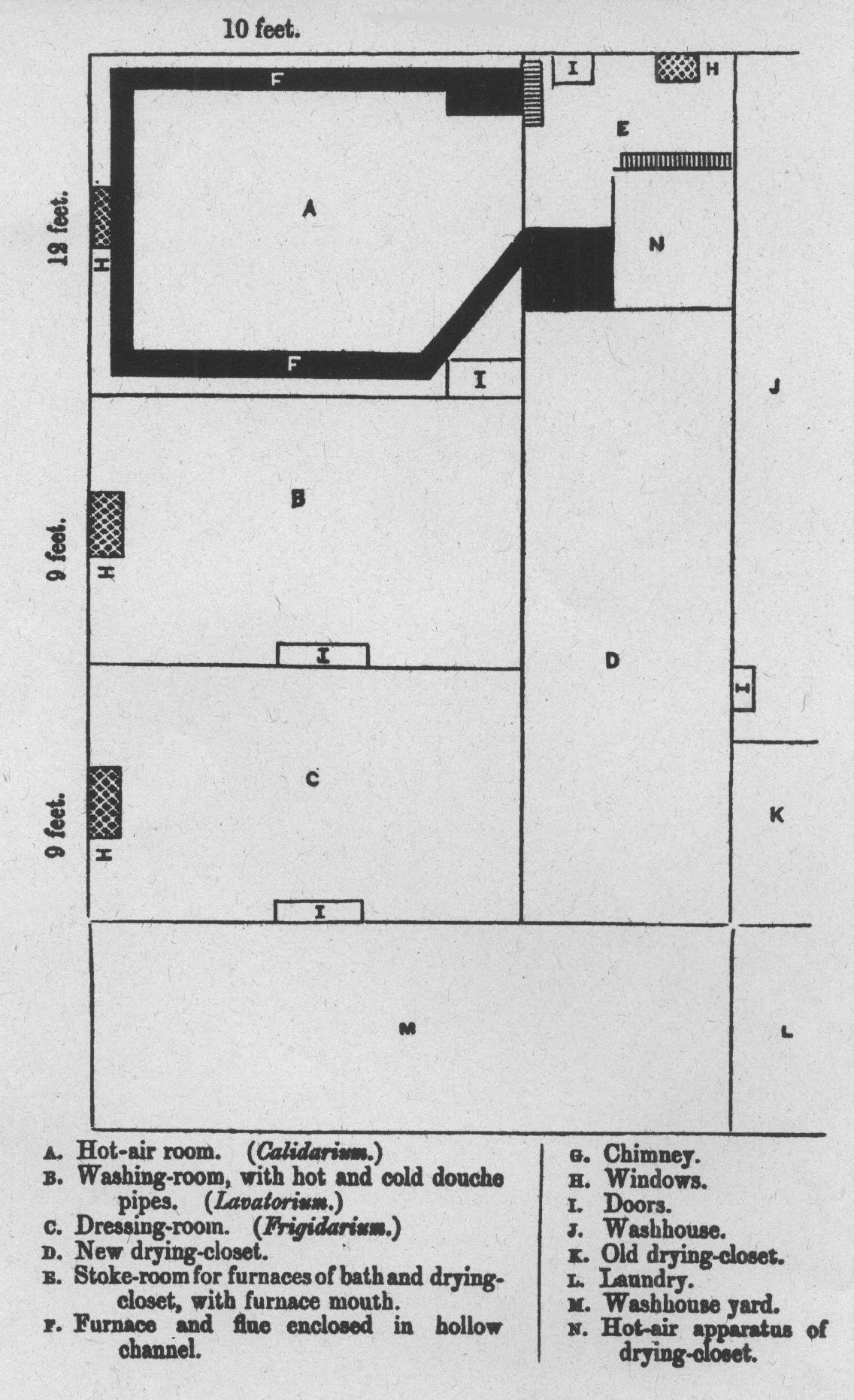
Plan of Sussex Asylum Turkish bath

In England, the Medical Superintendent of the Sussex District Lunatic Asylum at Haywards Heath, Dr Charles Lockhart Robertson, was, like Power, a member of the Medico-Psychological Association (later, the Royal College of Psychiatrists). He would have known about Power's Turkish bath from its inception, and was one of several medical practitioners who had been introduced to the bath at George Witt's home in Knightsbridge. Robertson determined to install one at Haywards Heath.

Even before it was completely finished, he included a plan and description of it in a review of Erasmus Wilson's book The Eastern, or Turkish bath which he was writing for the Journal of Mental Science. Built as a lean-to against a new wash-house, the total cost was £50 including piping in water for the showers. But improvements made during the following couple of years would have added to this.

Robertson did not make Power's mistake of claiming cures for the new bath. Responding in 1863 to a letter from Urquhart asking about it, he noted that it had been helpful in cases of melancholia, with patients who had been refusing food, and in restoring regular menstruation in young women. But not least important was the general improvement in health gained from the cleansing effects of the bath.

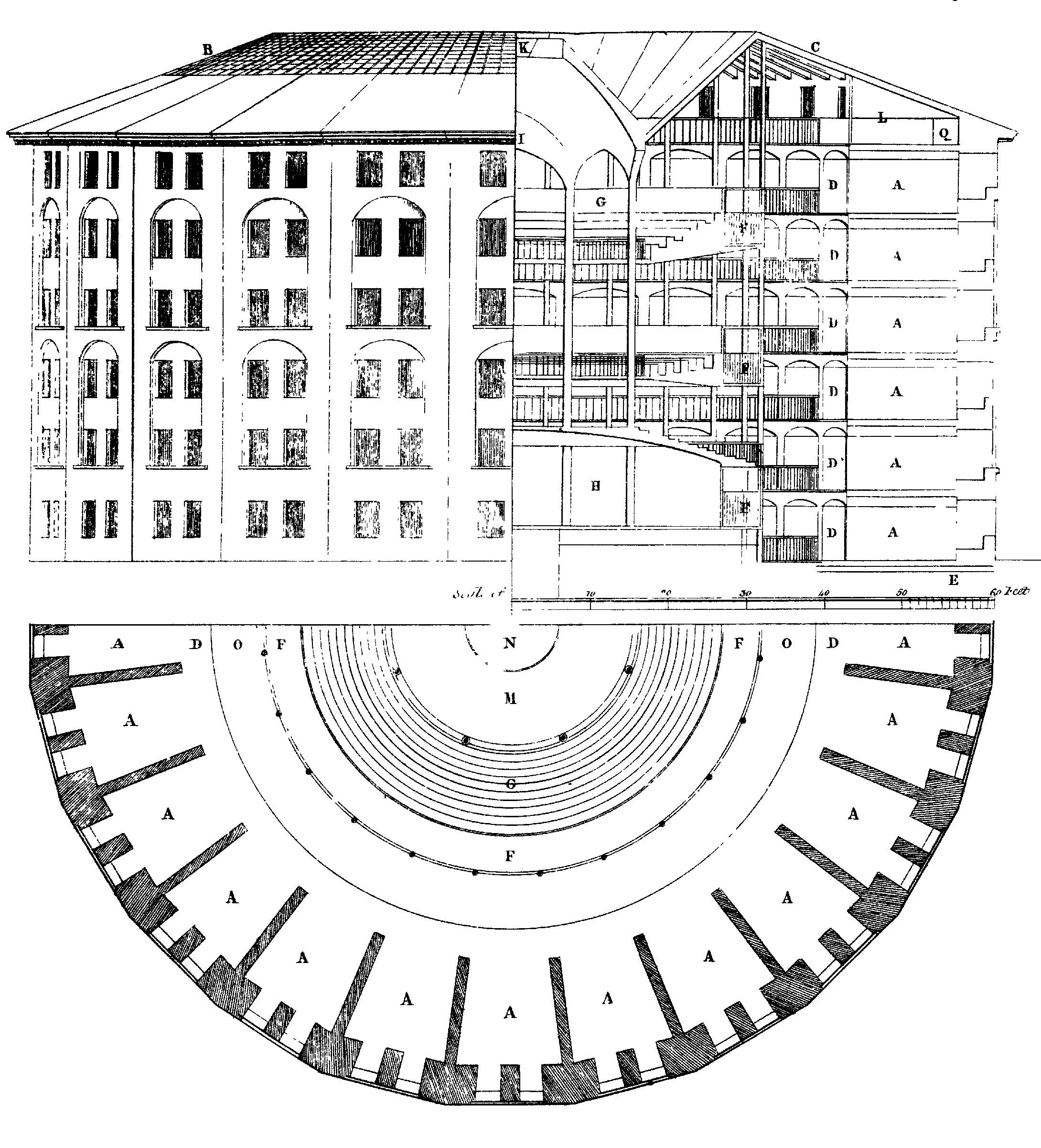
Jeremy Bentham's Panopticon prison

The largest asylum in England was The Second Middlesex County Asylum, commonly known as Colney Hatch, and by 1863 it was able to hold 2,000 patients. Dr Edgar Sheppard, long a supporter of hydropathy and, since its reintroduction, an advocate of the Turkish bath, became Medical Superintendent of the Male Department in 1862. After a visit to Dr Power's bath at Cork, he decided to invite Urquhart and Robert Poore (both directors of the London & Provincial Turkish Bath Company Ltd) to visit the asylum and ask for their advice on providing a bath at Colney Hatch.

Concerned that the asylum's board would be wary of an expensive new facility which catered for only a few patients, Urquhart proposed a large bath costing £500 based, for ease of supervision, on the plan of Jeremy Bentham's Panopticon prison. To maximise its use, he proposed that bathers could be arranged in 'relays from six in the morning till eight at night' and so 700 patients a day could use the bath. Like Bentham's prison, these baths were never built.

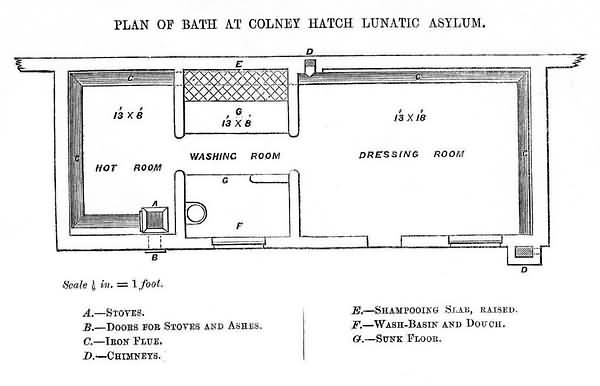
Plan of Turkish bath at Colney Hatch

After rejection by the board on account of cost, a more modest bath was built costing £300. It opened in July 1865, was mentioned several times in the asylum's annual report as being a success, and confirmed as such in the following year's report. This contrasted well with the asylum's toilet provision and normal washing facilities. These were considered unacceptable by the Commissioners in Lunacy and, 'It was not until 1883 that every patient was bathed in fresh water.'^{:p. 146} In 1868, the bath was used 600 times by 104 patients. This was a very small percentage of the total, as noted by the Commissioners, in effect confirming Urquhart's preference for a larger building. The bath was still in use in the 1880s inspiring the construction of a bath at Claybury Asylum, Woodford, in 1893.

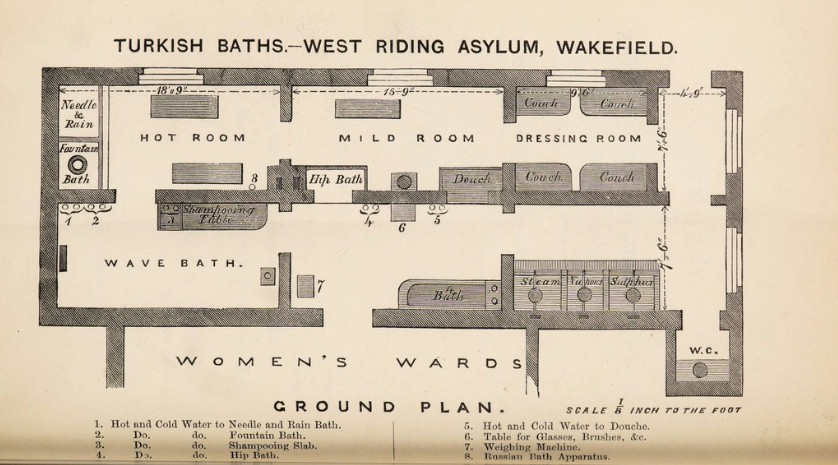
Wakefield asylum Turkish bath plan

Influenced by these early baths, several other asylums installed Turkish baths, often for use by staff as well as patients. Another member of the Medico-Psychological Association, Dr George Turner Jones, was responsible for the one at the North Wales Counties Lunatic Asylum, Denbigh, in 1871.

In the same year, James Crichton-Browne installed a Turkish bath at the West Riding Pauper Lunatic Asylum, Wakefield. Uniquely, it was built by a group of patients who, as skilled artisans, worked to an extremely high standard. Its six rooms had 'Moorish' style arched doorways, frosted glass windows and encaustic tiles. Crichton-Browne was especially concerned about asylum hygiene and drainage, ensuring the provision of a wide range of showers, baths, and steam cabinets.

Privately funded asylums were not without Turkish baths either. The Retreat in York, founded in 1792 by Quaker philanthropist William Tuke, was then considered a more humane asylum in its minimal use of restraint, and its rejection of physical punishments. Yet fifteen years passed after the installation of Power's Turkish bath in the Cork Asylum before The Retreat followed suit, although its Superintendent, Dr John Kitching, was also a member of the Medico-Psychological Association.

Kitching eventually wrote a paper proposing the installation of a Turkish bath, arguing that provision for a life in which monotony and ennui were reduced to a minimum would, in time, be considered, 'as effectually parts of the treatment of the insane, as the taking of medicine.' But it was his successor, Dr Robert Baker, who worked with the Retreat's architect, Edward Taylor, in bringing to fruition the plan recommended by the sub-committee set up to consider Kitching's proposal.

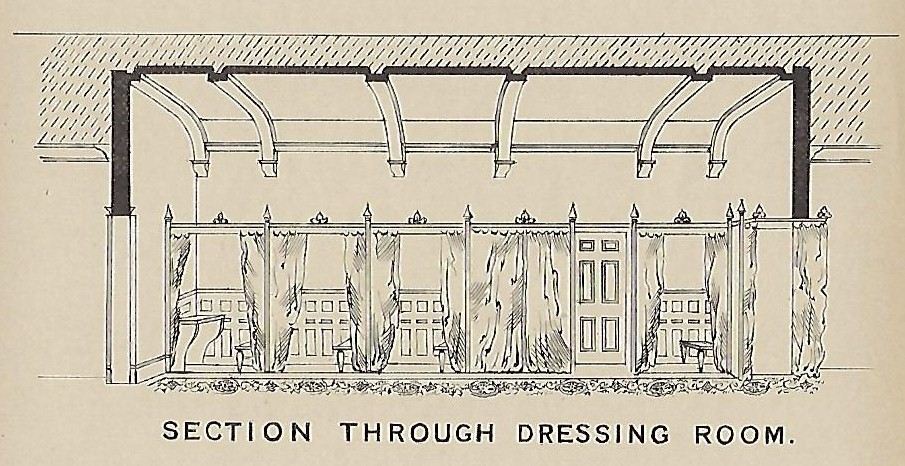
The Retreat Turkish bath

Taylor's bath consisted of two hot rooms, the air being heated by a boiler in the basement below the shampooing room. There was also a cabinet vapour bath and, uniquely in an asylum bath, a hydropathic area. Here, wet sheet packing (when the patient was wrapped in cold wet sheets for varying periods of time) could be provided. In 1889, Baker gave a paper on ten years' use of the Turkish bath at The Retreat. Although packing was popular in hydropathic establishments for several years, it is not mentioned in Baker's paper. This was almost certainly due to the fact that the Commissioners in Lunacy felt it necessary to include wet sheet packing among their deprecated forms of mechanical restraint. The Turkish bath itself was considered a success and continued to be used by men and women patients, as well as by staff and paying members of the public, until at least 1908.

Less well-known asylums like Caterham Imbecile Asylum and the Holloway Sanatorium in Virginia Water also installed Turkish baths. Dr Adam, Medical Superintendent at Caterham, only gained approval in 1874, on a second request to his managers. His appeal carried weight because he spoke from experience in its use, having previously worked as Assistant Medical Officer at Colney Hatch.

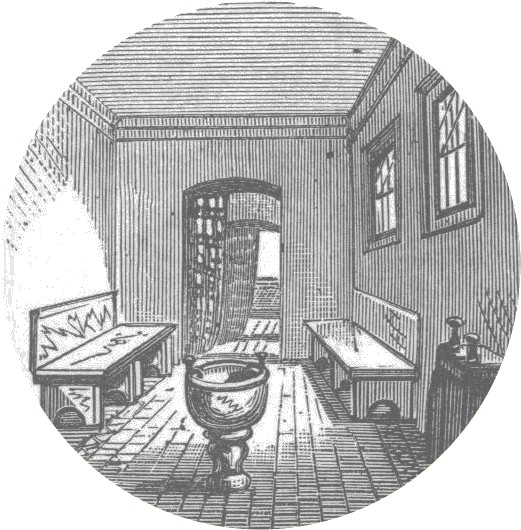
Holloway Sanatorium Turkish bath

Holloway Sanatorium was designed for paying middle class patients of both sexes, and built as a gift to the nation by Thomas Holloway from the profits of his eponymous pills. On the advice of the Commissioners in Lunacy the architect was chosen by competition. This was won by William Henry Crossland, with John Philpot Jones and Edward Salomons. Among the judges advising on the technical side of the building was Dr Robertson who had installed the bath at Haywards Heath.

The plans, which were publicly exhibited in 1872, showed separate baths for men and women in the basement, with vapour baths in addition to the Turkish baths. But when the sanatorium opened in 1885, the vapour baths had been omitted. However, in common with the rest of the building, the standard of the baths was high, with 'marble seats and wall linings, while a shampooing room had a marble basin and pedestal'.

=== Victorian Turkish baths in hydropathic establishments and hotels ===
==== Hydropathic establishments ====
The first hydros opened in Europe, especially in Germany and Austria, in the 1820s. They soon appeared in London, Malvern, and other places in the south-east of England, before moving north to smaller locations like Ilkley and Matlock. In 1843, after a visit to Ireland by Richard Tappin Claridge (known as the father of hydropathy in the British Isles) Barter and James Wherland independently visited Malvern and other English hydros and then opened their own in Cork. Similarly, after Claridge's visit to Glasgow, also in 1843, hydros opened in Scotland, where there were eventually more than anywhere else in the kingdom.

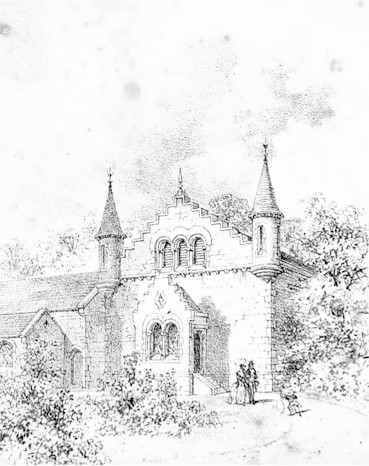
Ben Rhydding Turkish baths exterior

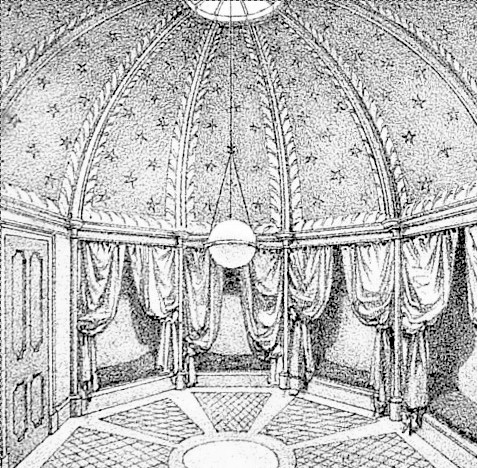
Ben Rhydding Turkish baths tepidarium

In 1859, less than two years after Barter's third, (and most successful) Turkish bath came into use at St Ann's, William Macleod built one at his recently purchased Ben Rhydding Hydro in Ilkley. As at St Ann's, the Turkish baths occupied a separate building. This was designed in a Scottish Baronial style by architects Lockwood and Mawson, making them the first major architectural practice to build a Turkish bath in England, and preparing them for those they later built at Saltaire and Keighley.

There were three main rooms at Ben Rhydding, the frigidarium, tepidarium, and caldarium, ranging in temperatures from 100 °F–150 °F. All had encaustic tiled floors and were well furnished with wood panel enclosed dressing cubicles in the frigidarium, curtained cubicles with couches for reclining in the tepidarium, and covered benches and a central shampooing table in the caldarium. However, at Ben Rhydding, Macleod adopted Ling's (Swedish) massage rather than Urquhart's preferred Turkish-style shampooing. There were also cold water baths, a wave douche (a horizontal 'gush' of water like a small cascade, before which a bather stands and turns according to preference), and spray showers.

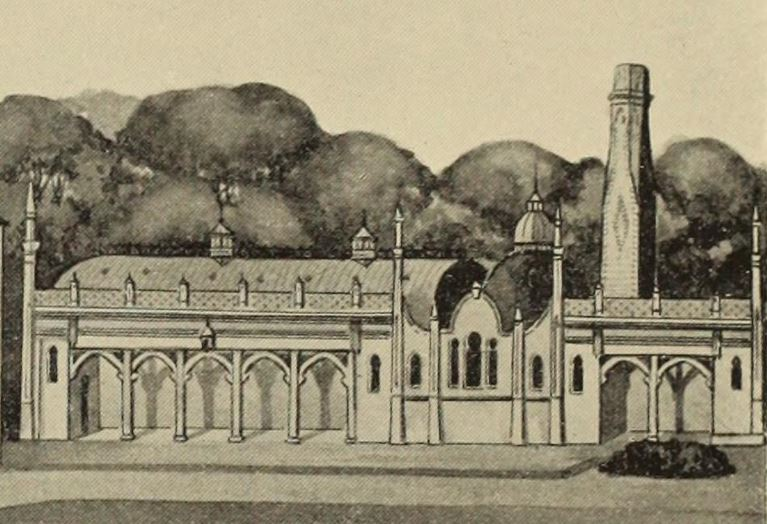
Lochhead Turkish baths

Most hydros which opened before the late 1850s added Turkish baths sooner or later, while most new hydros included them as a matter of course. But only a few, including Lochhead and Bridge of Allan (in Scotland), Llandudno (in Wales), and Blackpool Imperial (in England), built them as separate buildings. The larger establishments incorporated their Turkish baths in extensive baths departments, which included rows of hot and cold baths, sitz baths, and a variety of showers. Allsop's standard work on baths in hydropathic establishments includes plans of such departments at Smedley's hydro in Matlock and in several Scottish hydros, such as Dunblane.

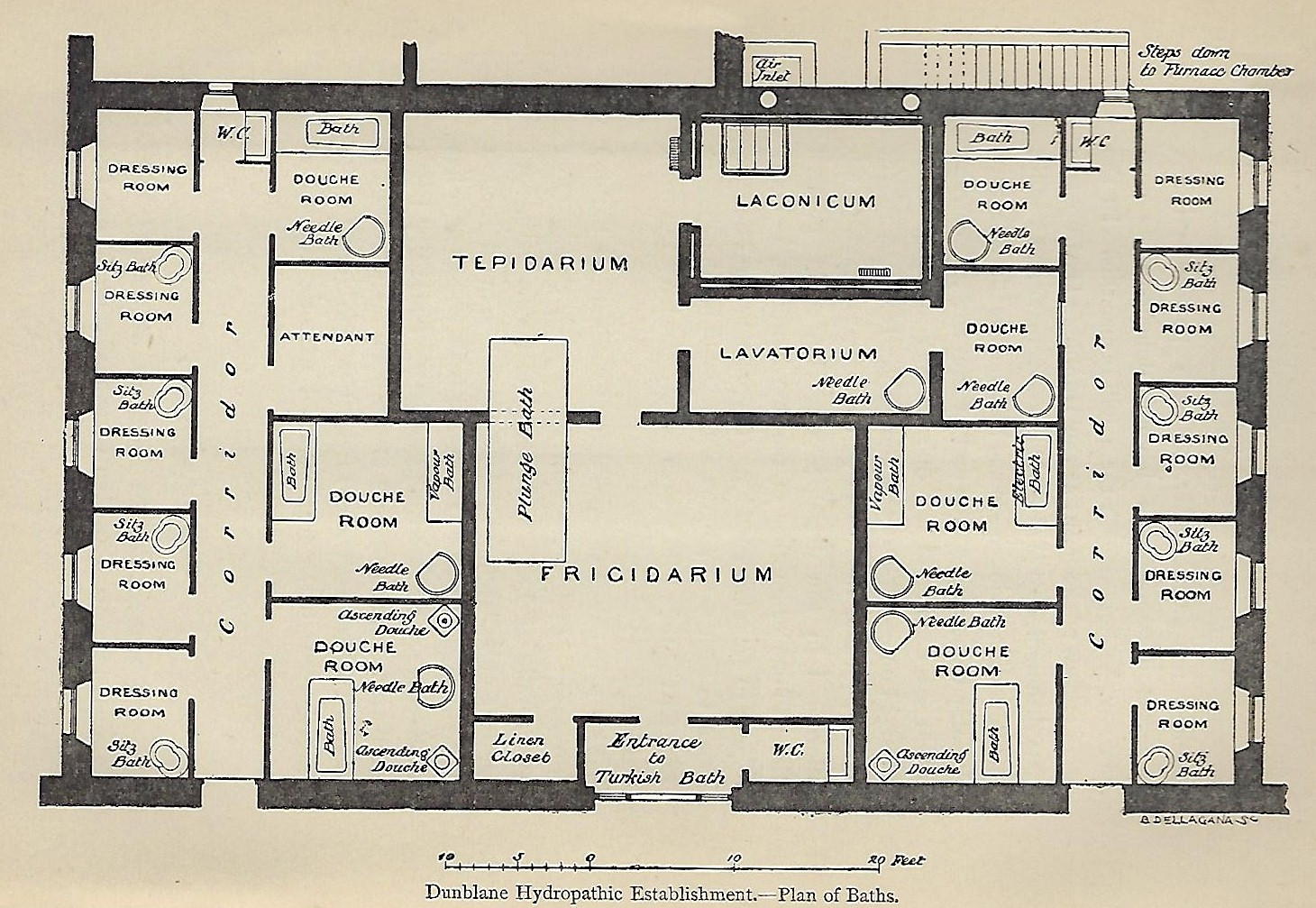
Dunblane Hydro baths plan

At Ben Rhydding, Macleod's choice of the gentler Ling's massage and the use of lower temperatures than those preferred by his predecessors, together with his later ending of the temperance regime normal at hydros, softened the rigour which predominated at the first establishments. Additionally, the length of a recommended hydropathic treatment, resulting in patients' separation from their families for extended periods, gradually led to the increasing provision of recreational facilities for them such as swimming pools and tennis courts, thereby also courting the patronage of non-patients and families.

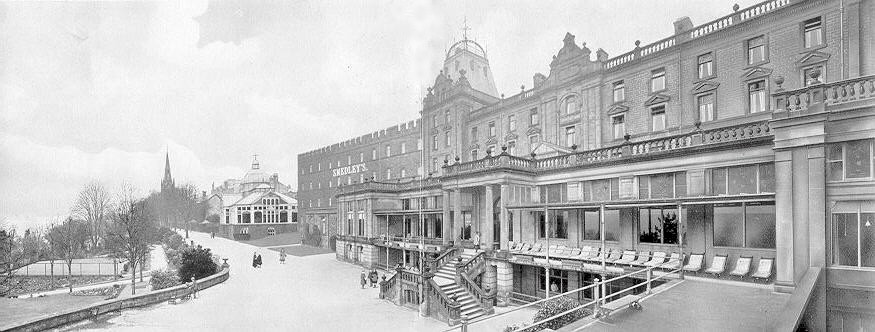
Smedley's Hydro panoramic view

As hydropathy became less fashionable so the larger hydros morphed into hydro-hotels, and those that closed were often converted by their new proprietors into ordinary hotels. Having to counter this trend were the traditional hotels which, not wishing to lose custom to the hydros, also had to change.

==== Hotels ====
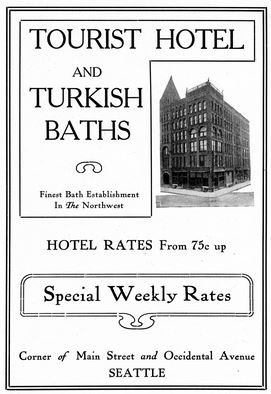
Advert, 1909

During the latter part of the 19th century and the early part of the 20th, many hotel proprietors felt the need to add Turkish baths to their facilities in order to stay competitive. This affected hotels of all sizes including the large railway hotels such as the Midland in Manchester and the Adelphi in Liverpool, smaller independent ones such as the Windsor Hotel in London or the Cockburn in Edinburgh, those at the seaside such as the Granville in Ramsgate and the Metropole in Brighton, together with numerous ordinary small hotels in towns around the British Isles and abroad.

The size of a hotel was not necessarily an indication of the size of its Turkish baths or of the facilities they comprised. Records of what was included in the smaller hotels are especially difficult to find.

The Midland Hotel, lavishly designed by Charles Trubshaw, for example, though 'replete with every convenience and luxury' was 'smaller than other similar places' in Manchester.

The unusually named Romo Thermæ Baths at the Windsor Hotel, which advertised widely but briefly, only described some of its facilities when it re-opened following its 1888 refurbishment. Noted were three hot rooms at 270 °F, 180 °F (82 °C), and 150 °F (66 °C), with a cooling-room at 65 °F (18 °C). There was a shampooer 'always in attendance', a 'swimming pool', and the constant availability of ordinary hot water baths. A separate advertorial refers to the cooling-room being decorated with ferns and rockwork, and 'strewn with Persian rugs'. This establishment was, in effect, little different from a standalone Turkish bath but housed in a hotel rather than a converted house or shop.

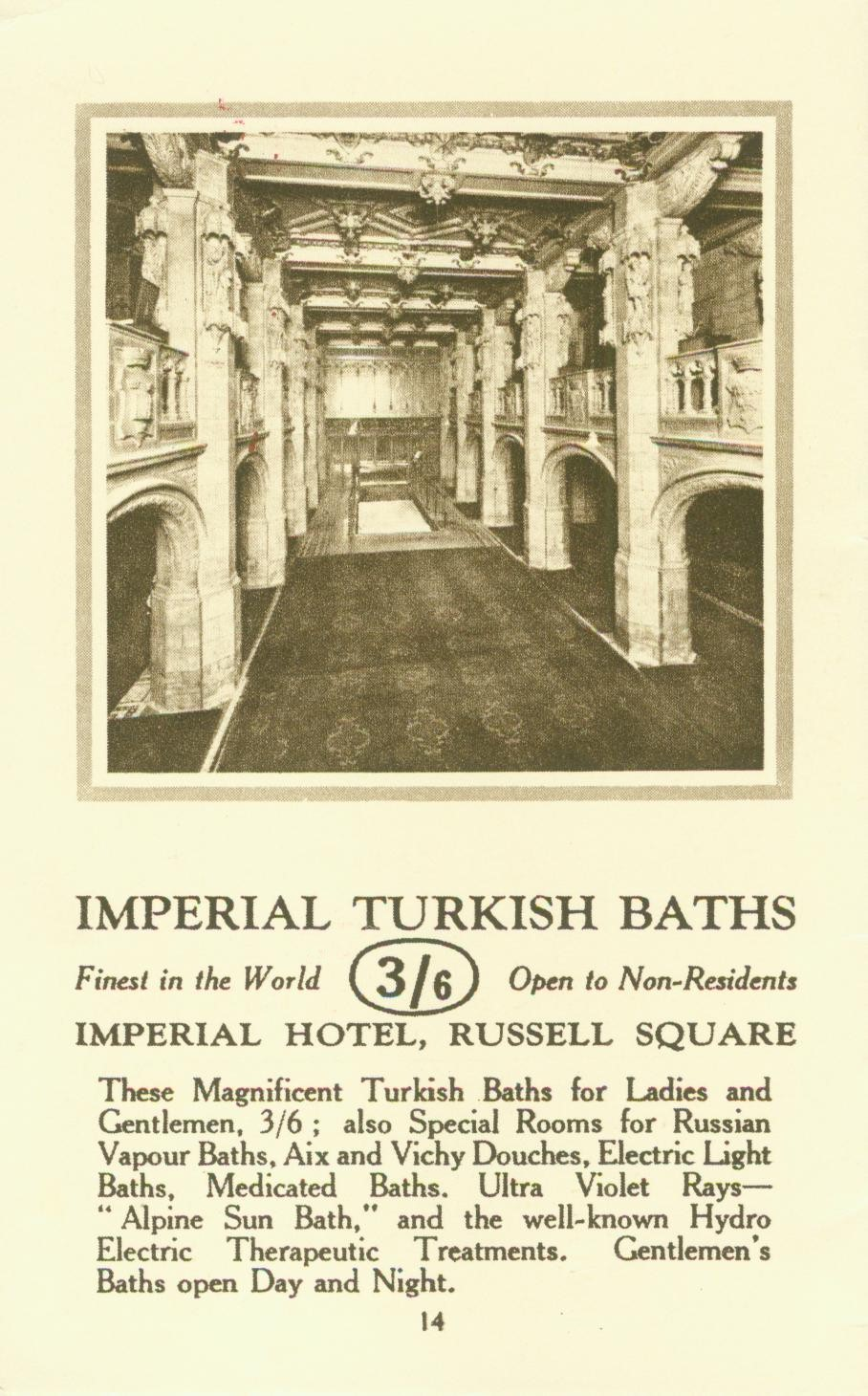
The tepidarium and plunge pool

The most impressive Turkish baths in London, after the wartime destruction of the Jermyn Street baths, was that designed by Fitzroy Doll in the basement and sub-basement of the extension to the Imperial Hotel in Russell Square. Opened in 1913, it was one of three London establishments where the men's baths were open all night. It closed in 1966 and was demolished with the rest of the hotel.

Open to non-residents, the baths had a separate entrance from the street as well as access from the hotel. Shoes and other outdoor clothing were deposited in a cloakroom just outside the main entrance, before entering an inner hall leading into the main open area of the baths. This was a long 'great hall' best described as 'a nave of nine bays formed by octagonal piers.' Towards the top of these were terracotta figures in elaborate niches, a few of which have been placed in the courtyard of the current hotel. On either long side of the 'nave' were aisles, and above them galleries—mostly divided into rest areas furnished with beds surrounded by red curtains. At either end of the hall was a 'mean staircase' starting as a single flight, and dividing into two, each at right angles to the first, and leading up to one of the galleries. Painted coats of arms decorated the Jacobean style ceiling, from which were suspended rotating fans, and 'spiky' lights. Halfway between the two aisles was a decorative fountain and, two-thirds of the way along the hall, 'like a Black Mass chancel screen, a wall of wandering stained glass reptiles lit up from within' divided the first part of the room, the frigidarium, from the tepidarium beyond. In the centre of the room, continuing under the screen, was a plunge pool allowing swimmers to pass beneath it from one area to the other, while in the aisles there were doors for non-swimmers. The sofas on the dry side gave way to deck chairs of canvas and wood on the wet side. To the right of the tepidarium was an electric light bath, and to the left, through the waiting room with its three needle showers, was the shampooing room with marble slabs and basins for five masseurs. Finally, at the far end of the hall, behind the staircase, was a small Russian bath and three hot rooms. Their walls were faced with tiles of elaborate 'Moorish' design, their mosaic floors almost completely covered with thick red Turkish carpets, and their white marble seats furnished with white canvas slab cushions and canvas hanging backs, to protect bathers from being burned.

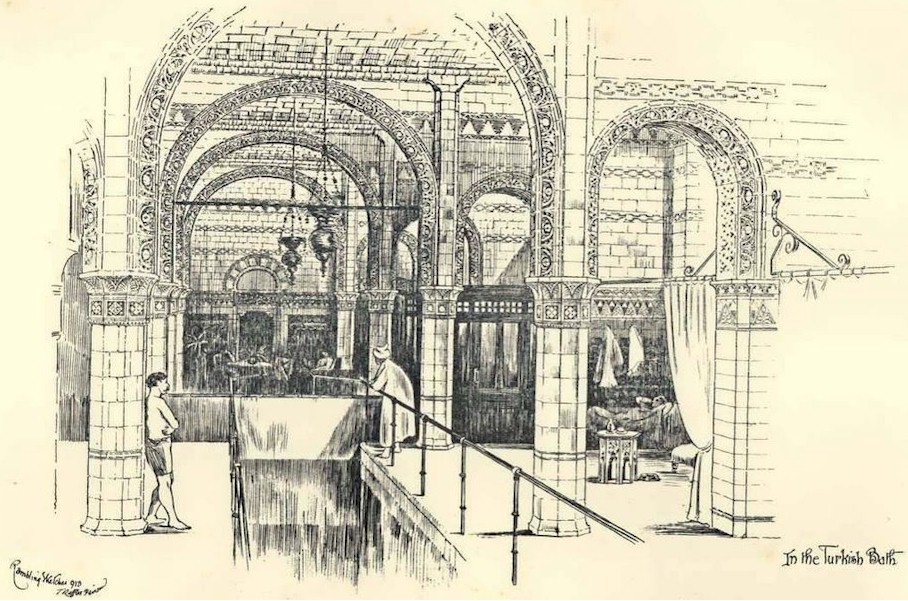
Metropole cooling-room and plunge

Outside London, also impressive, but quite different in style from Doll's Turkish baths, were those in the Hotel Metropole in Brighton. These, like the hotel itself, were designed by the eminent Victorian architect Alfred Waterhouse for Gordon Hotels Ltd, and opened in 1890. The spacious light-coloured stonework eschewed eastern keyhole arches and, like other large Victorian Turkish baths, its plunge pool passed under a screen into the first hot room—this plunge, however, was filled with cold sea water. Women guests fared badly, the bath initially only being available to them on Tuesday afternoon and evenings, though by 1906 a similar period on Thursdays had been added. In 1959, the hotel was sold to AVP who appointed London's Savoy Turkish Baths to manage the hotel baths for them. Nevertheless, as part of a major redevelopment, they were soon replaced by a health club and swimming pool.

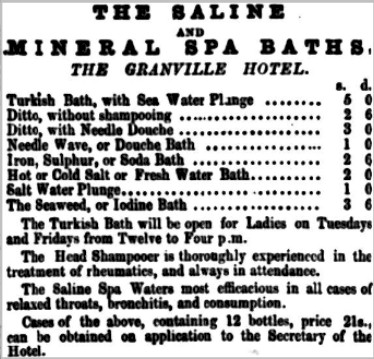
Granville ad

Little information is available to indicate how the numerous smaller hotels advertising Turkish baths were fitted up, or what facilities they offered. But the Granville Hotel in Ramsgate, designed by Edward Welby Pugin, was an exception. Their 'Saline and Mineral Spa Baths' were widely advertised. The Turkish bath, with sea water plunge, could be taken with needle douche and shampooing as optional extras. Other extras included iron, sulphur, soda, seaweed or iodine baths, and it was claimed that the saline spa waters were 'most efficacious in all cases of relaxed throats, bronchitis, and consumption'.

=== Victorian Turkish baths in clubs ===
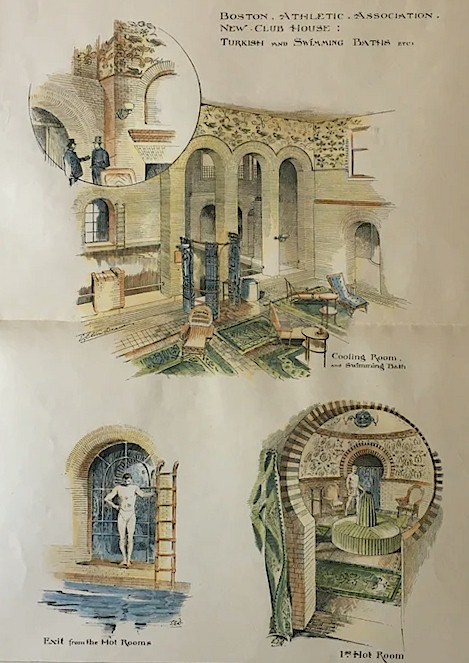
BAA baths

In the latter part of the 19th century, Victorian Turkish baths were occasionally installed in clubs, with the result that they were only available for use by members of those clubs and their guests. Such clubs were of two types, with slightly different emphases. The majority comprised clubs set up, especially in Scotland, specifically to provide swimming pools for its members, to which Turkish baths, gymnasia, and other facilities might later be added. But swimming was not always the primary interest. Sometimes, as in the Boston Athletic Association clubhouse, and in the socially exclusive Prince's Racquet and Tennis Club in London, (Note: Although the Prince of Wales was a member, the club was named after its founders, the Prince brothers, George and James. The second word in the club's name was sometimes spelled Racket, though Racquet seems to have predominated.) other sporting activities were the raison d'être of the club, and the addition of a swimming pool and Turkish baths was already seen at the planning stage to be a natural complement to the club's main activities. The remaining few were typically English "gentlemen's clubs" providing accommodation, dining rooms and bars, writing and smoking rooms, possibly a library, and additionally, though only rarely, a swimming pool and Turkish bath.

In Scotland, where there was no legal requirement for local authorities to provide both first and second class baths, eight companies were set up to provide swimming pools for the better off who did not wish to use the 'invariably dirty' public pools where 'the spittoons were never clean' and their changing rooms overcrowded. Two of these were in Edinburgh, five in Glasgow, and one in Greenock. (Note: The Drumsheugh and Warrender clubs were in Edinburgh; the Arlington, Dennistoun, Pollockshields, Victoria, and Western clubs were in Glasgow; and the West End Baths Club was in Greenock.) In Glasgow, both the Arlington and Western baths clubs, with their Victorian Turkish baths, are still open. In Edinburgh, the Drumsheugh Baths Club is also still open, but its Turkish bath was closed some time during the 1970s.

==== The Arlington Baths Club ====
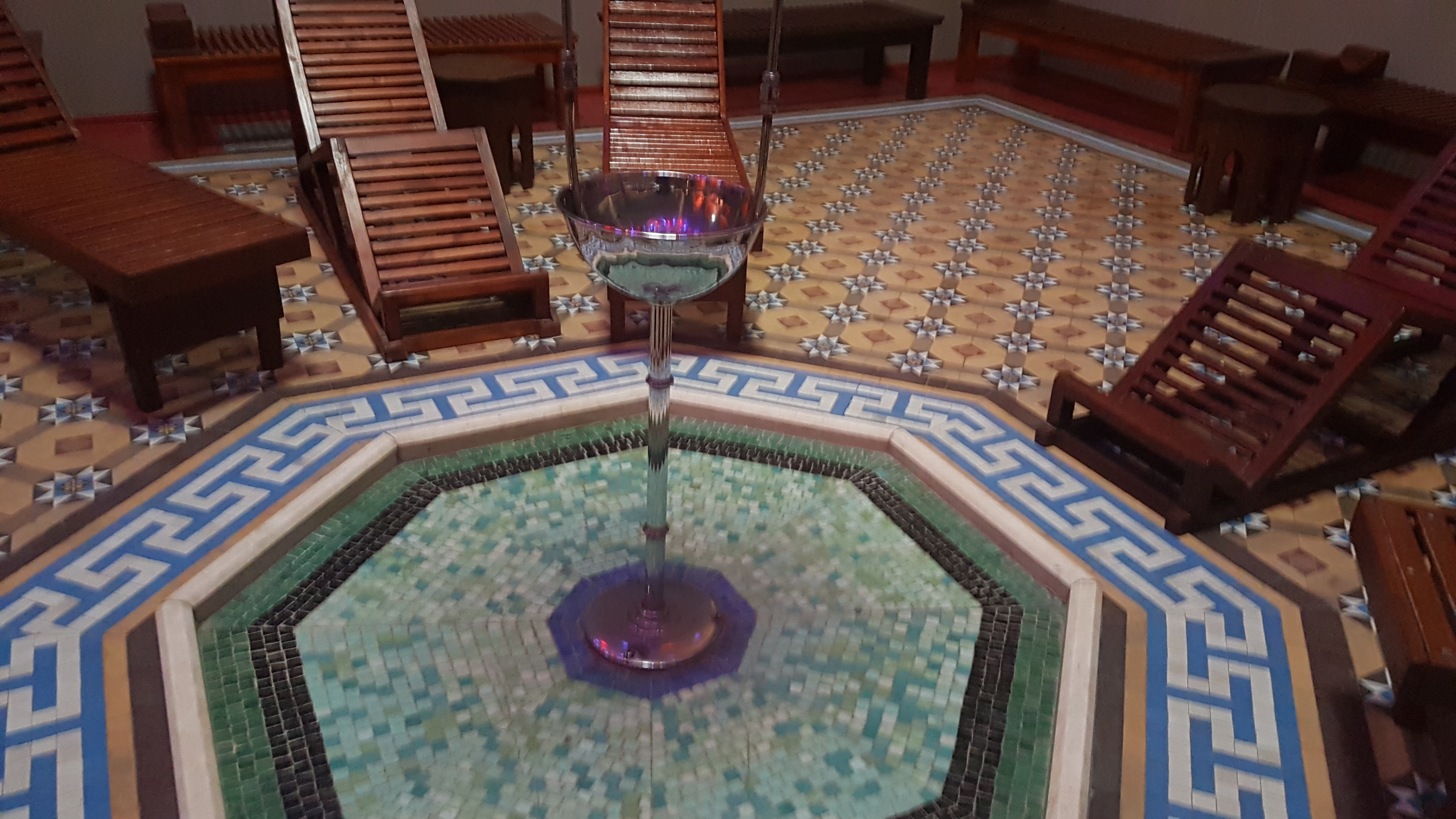
Part of the Arlington's tepidarium

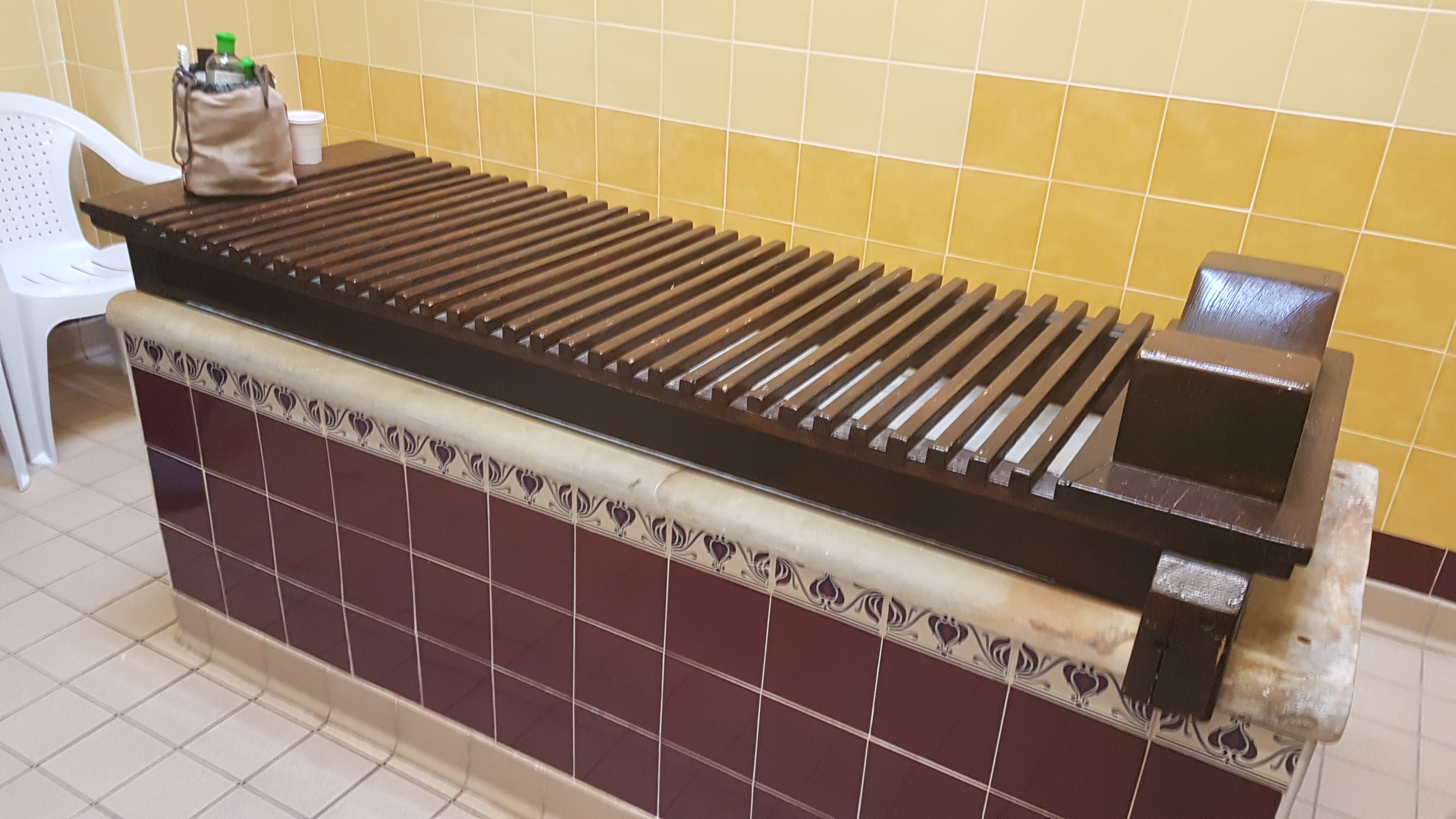
The club's unique massage table

The Arlington, opening in 1871, was the first such club in Scotland, and has now had women members for many years. Although John Burnet's original building (now Category A Listed) did not include a Turkish bath, the club quickly built a simple one in the basement, and installed a permanent one in 1875 in the first of the building's extensions. The T-shaped baths were headed by the frigidarium with benches round its walls and easy chairs in the centre. Double doors and a short curtained passageway led to the large square tepidarium, with its 20-foot (6.1 m) high domed ceiling pierced with 'Moorish' star-shaped stained-glass openings and, at the centre of its tiled floor, a shallow octagonal pool fed by a small decorative fountain. Inside the tepidarium, opposite the entrance, a wall comprising three large arches and a doorway led to the caldarium. The lower portion only of each arch was filled with plate glass which, in the central arch, was pivoted so that it could be opened. Other double doors led from the entrance passageway to the shampooing room. Further on was the washing room, and a small plunge pool connected, through an opening in the wall, directly with the main swimming pool. Above the water, the opening was covered with plate glass allowing bathers to swim underneath from one area to the other. Today, the hot room temperatures are lower than the original 144 °F–210 °F range, there is no plunge pool, and the arches enclosing the caldarium are now fully glazed, so that none swivels. Otherwise, apart from the stoves, and the decorative fountain, later replaced by a drinking fountain, the baths remain largely as they were when built.

The Arlington Baths Club was the inspiration behind Greenock's West End Baths Club, and also for The Bath Club in London, which persuaded Mr Robertson, the Arlington's second Bath Master, to move to London to manage it.

==== The Royal Automobile Club ====
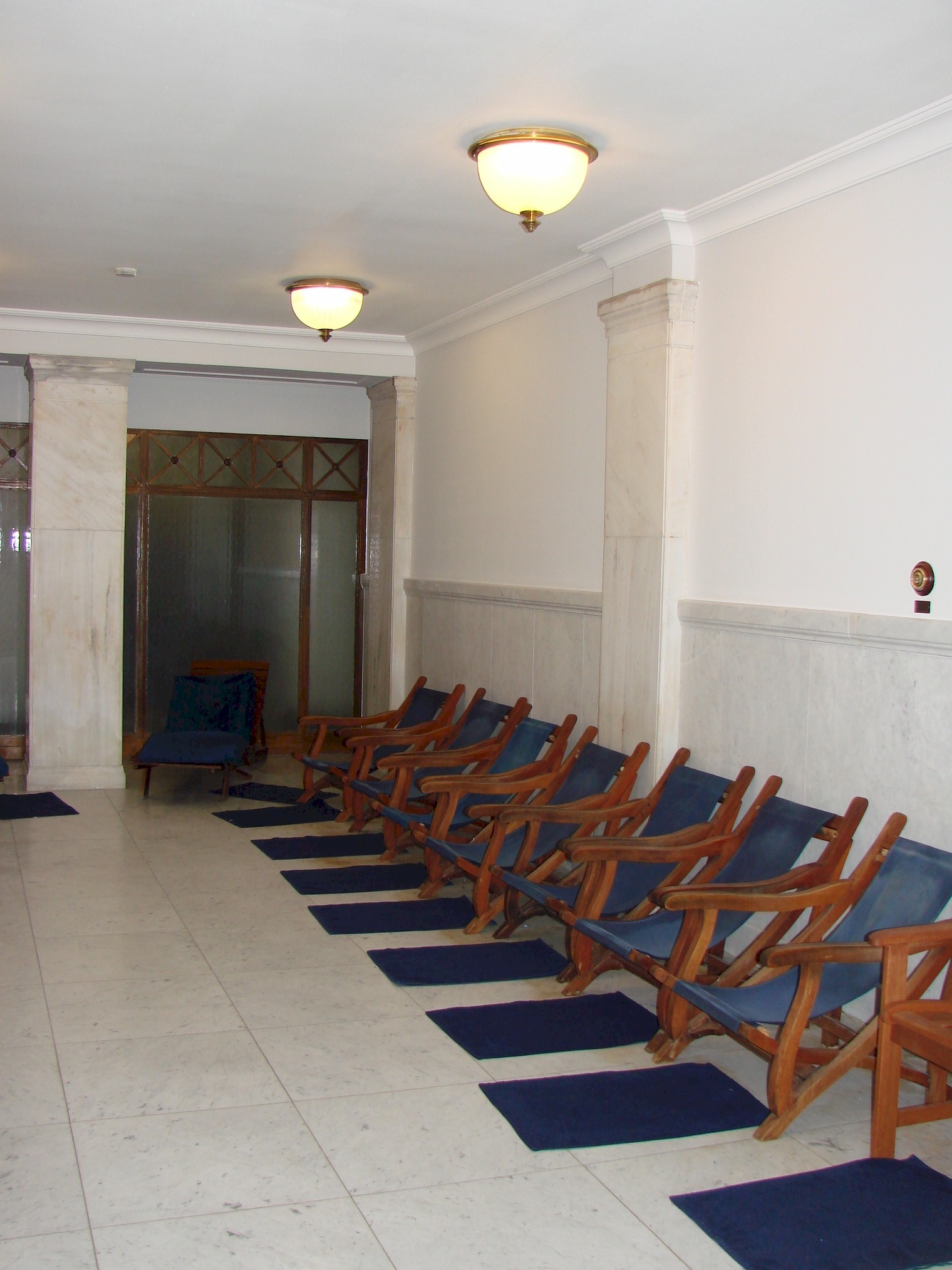
RAC Turkish baths hot room

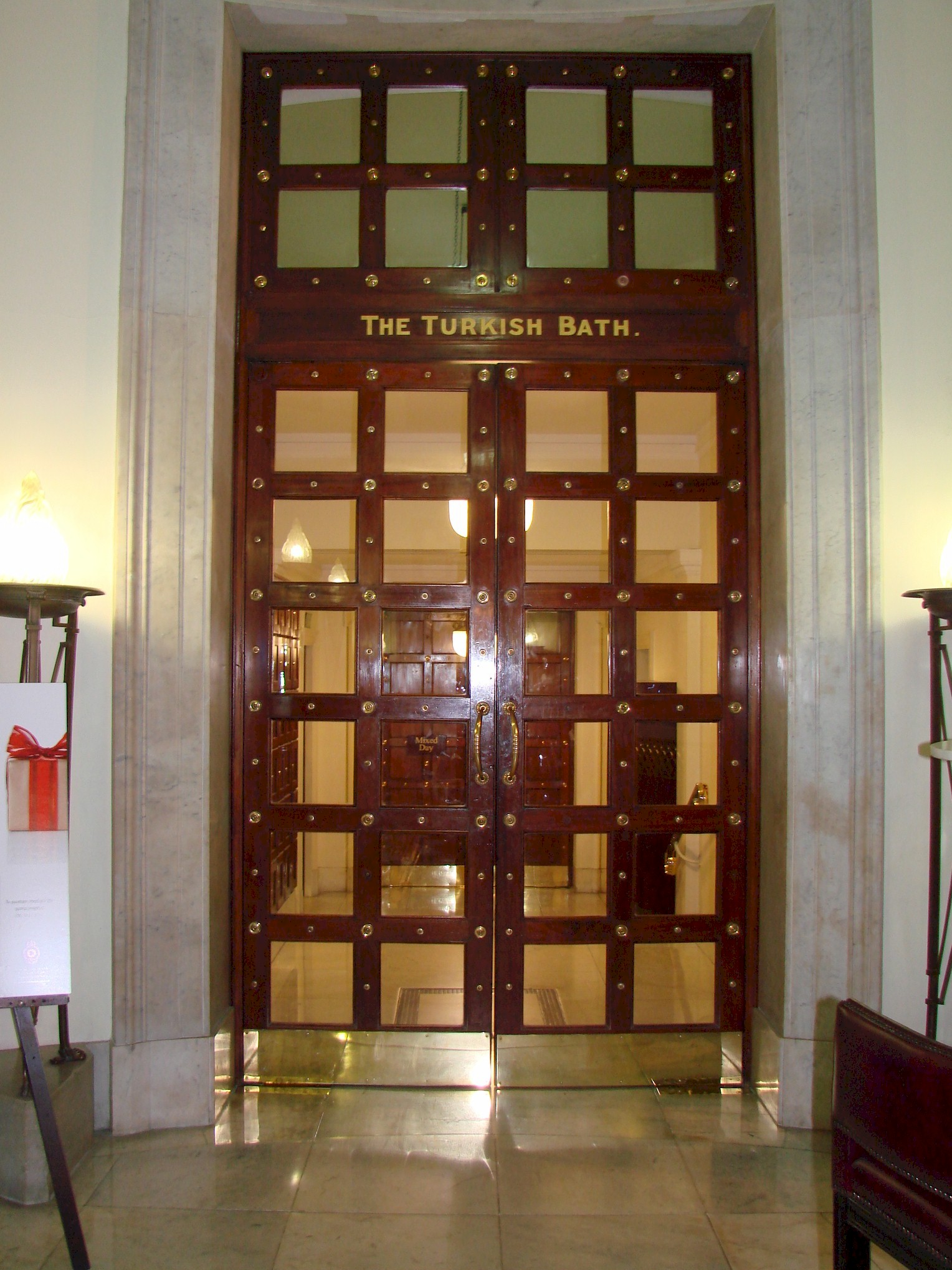
RAC Turkish baths entrance

When the recently renamed Royal Automobile Club moved into its new Pall Mall premises in 1911, its male-only members were all motoring enthusiasts or connected in some way with the motor industry or motorsport. It is best known for establishing the RAC roadside assistance service, though this is no longer owned by the club. (Note: For more on the history of the RAC, see its page on Graces Guide Retrieved 22 March 2024) Gradually the membership broadened until it is now predominately a social and athletic club, with additional premises near Epsom. The main London clubhouse was designed in the Beaux Arts tradition by the Anglo-French partnership of Charles Mewès (1858–1914) and the Englishman, Arthur Joseph Davis (1878–1951), architects of The Ritz Hotel, which had opened in nearby Piccadilly five years earlier. Sports facilities in the basement include a modern gym, squash courts, the Victorian-style Turkish baths, treatment rooms, and the full-sized Pompeian-style swimming pool. The entrance to the baths is down a passageway leading from the main vestibule into the large irregularly shaped frigidarium with its marble clad walls.

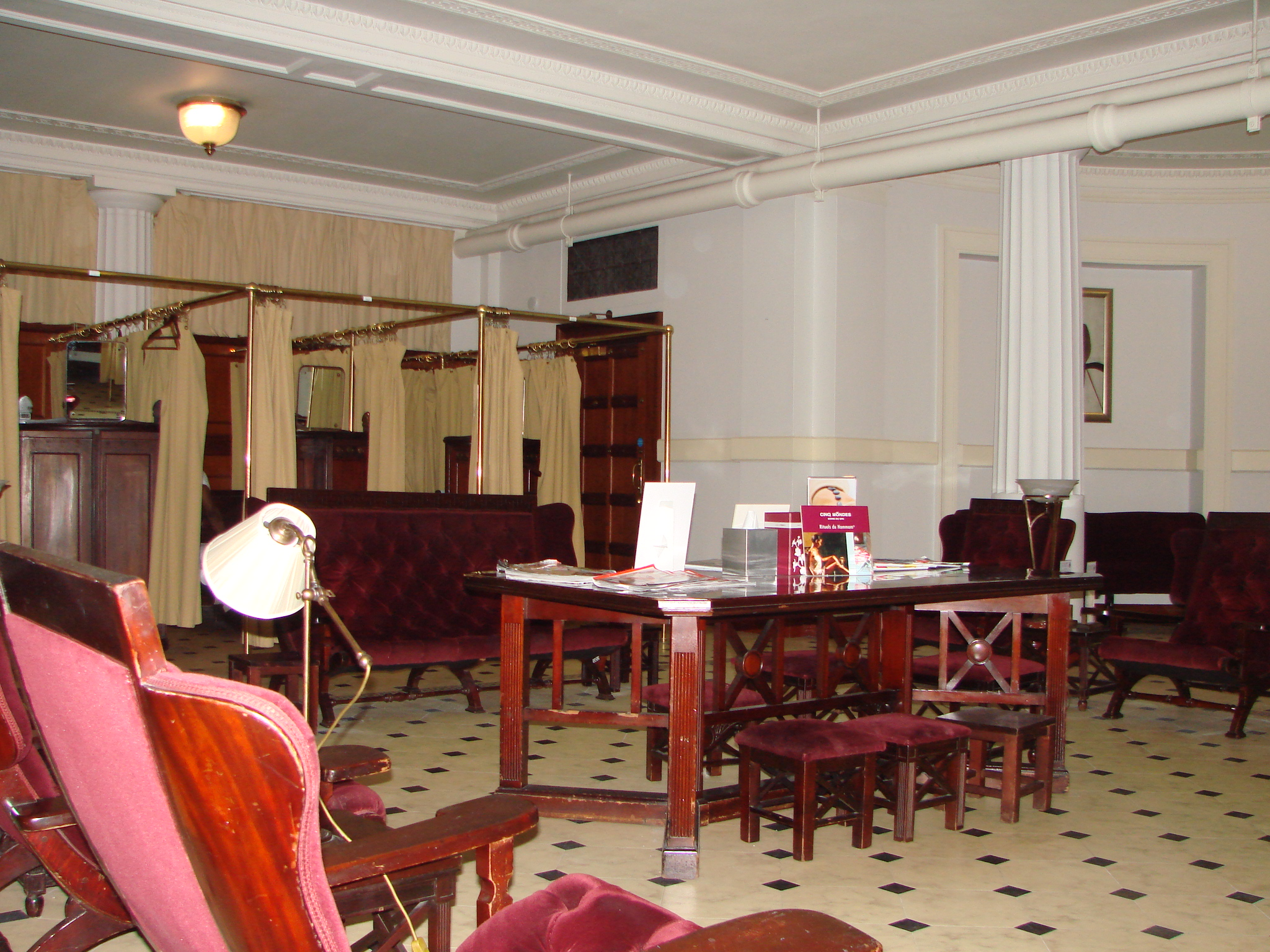
RAC Turkish baths frigidarium, with changing and resting cubicles at rear

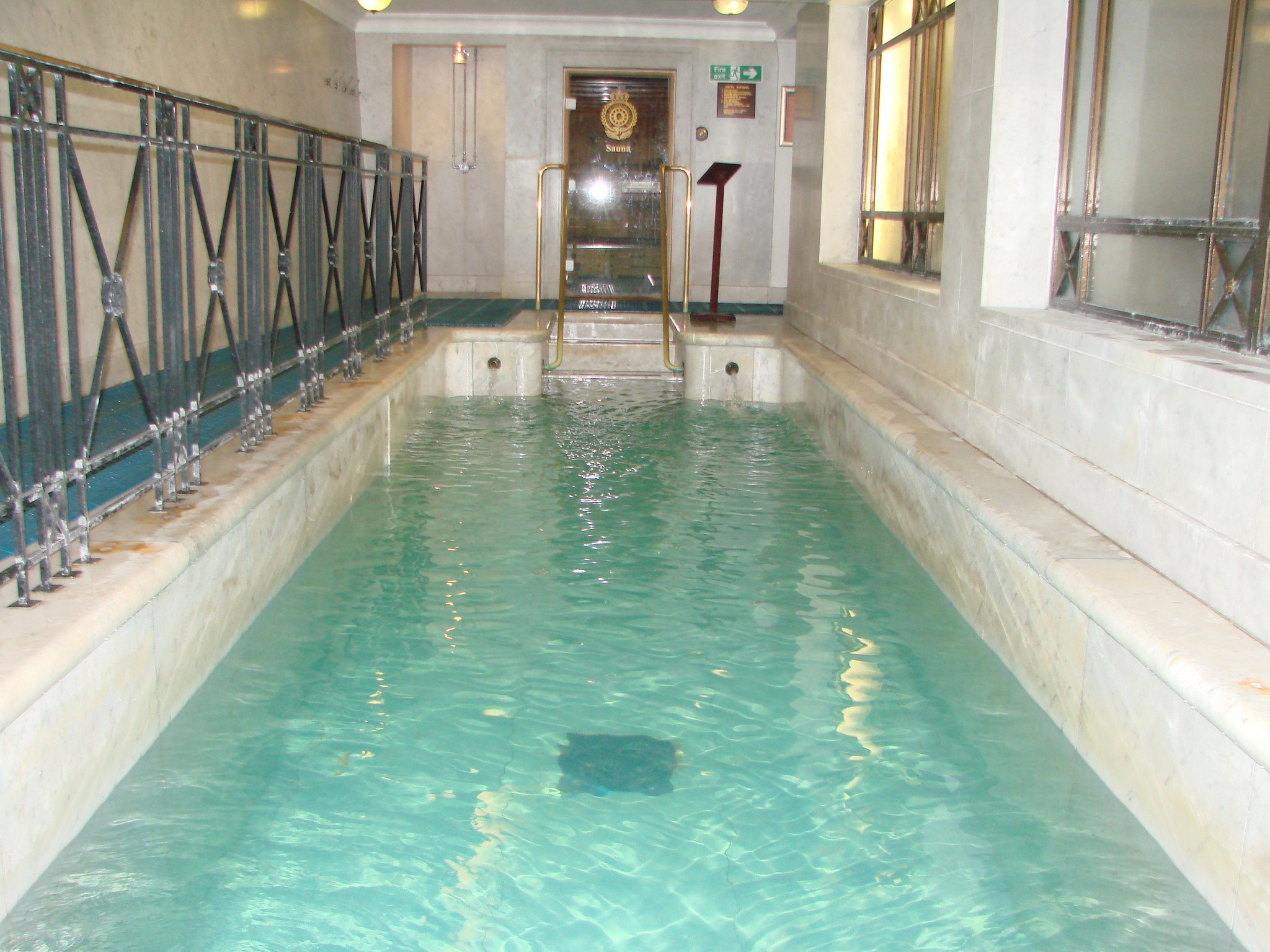
RAC Turkish baths plunge pool, with shower and sauna at the far end

Curtained changing cubicles, with couches for relaxation, originally lined the long sides of the room. Even looked at from an early 20th-century perspective, it is surprising to find that the only way from the frigidarium to the tepidarium was through the alcove set aside for smokers—though state-of-the-art air-conditioning probably relieved any non-smokers' discomfort. A three-panel glass screen at the far end of the tepidarium originally allowed bathers to observe the main swimming pool. From the tepidarium, bathers could progress either to the caldarium and laconicum or, turning right, try the Russian vapour bath, take a cold plunge in the narrow 30-foot (9.1 m) long pool, or be given a shampoo on one of the six slabs in the shampooing room. The rooms were heated by passing clean filtered air over high pressure steam tubes, raising it to the required temperature. In the majority of Victorian Turkish baths, the hot air then passes through each room in turn, cooling on its way. But at the RAC, this was considered objectionable. Instead, each room had its own fresh-air inlet near the ceiling, and an extraction grating on the opposite wall near the floor.

Towards the end of World War I, the club was requisitioned for use as war offices, but after much discussion the baths were allowed to remain open for use by 'officers on short leave'. The Turkish baths remained open day and night and over 74,000 baths were taken, officers knowing that 'when they could not find a bed anywhere, they could always come to the Turkish bath at the club.'

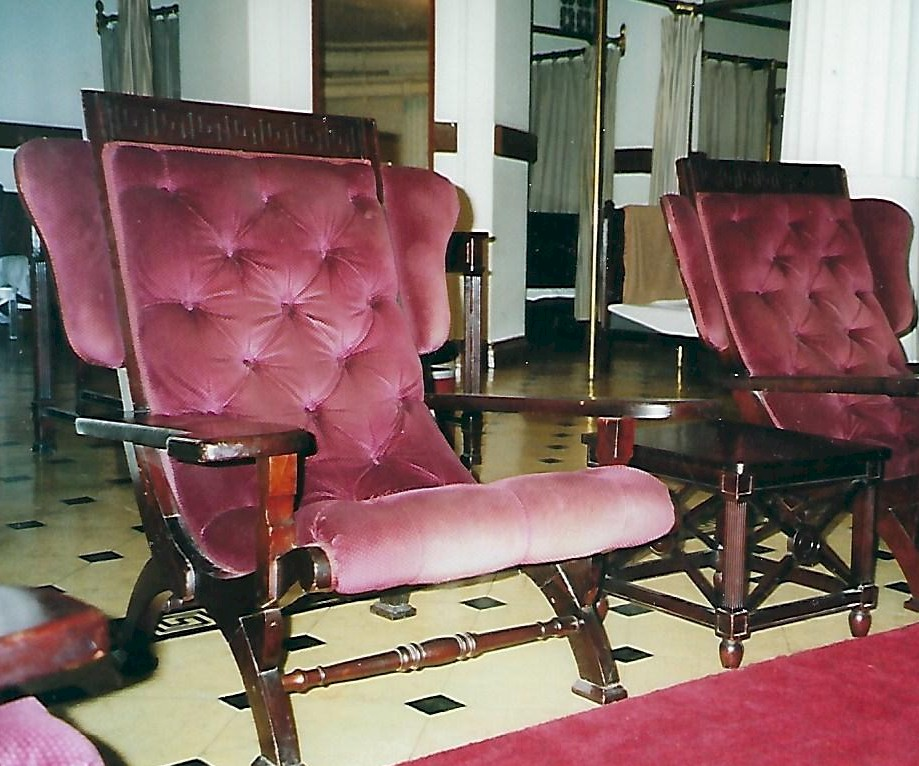
RAC Turkish bath cooling-room chairs

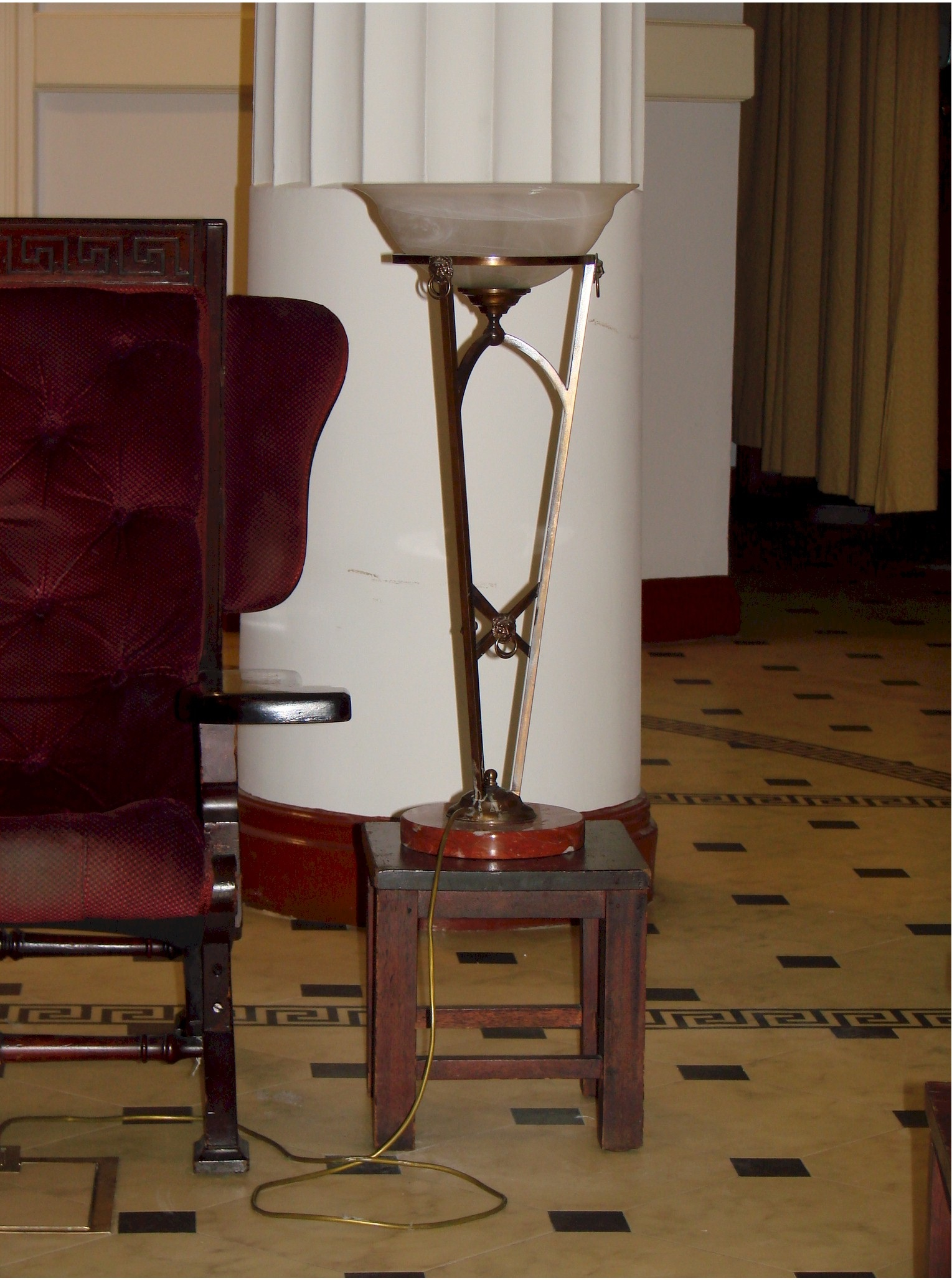
Cooling-room chair and lamp

At the end of the 1990s, the Royal Automobile Club—now totally divorced from RAC Motoring Services—undertook a major refurbishment of its building. An initial suggestion that a large corridor should, in effect, cut the Turkish bath in two was defeated after members went public with their objections. As a result, with one or two exceptions, the baths now look little different from how they appeared when first opened. Behind the scenes, changes have been far-reaching, with pool equipment, drainage, and heating systems all utilising modern technology. More visibly changed is the plunge pool with its modern sauna and adjacent shower. In the frigidarium, three walls are now lined with relaxation cubicles instead of the original two, and much of the earlier furniture and fittings survives. The smoking area has, of course, disappeared and the once transparent panels at the rear end of the tepidarium have been replaced with frosted glass, so there is no longer a view over the swimming pool. Temperatures in Turkish baths today are generally cooler that those aimed for in Victorian and Edwardian times. Here the original laconicum temperature of 260 °F (127 °C) has been reduced to a maximum of 154 °F. No longer a male-only preserve, men and women each have one day in the week for single-sex bathing when, except in the frigidarium, nude bathing is still permitted. The other days are mixed sessions where costumes are mandatory.

=== Victorian Turkish baths in ocean liners ===
The White Star Line was the first to provide Turkish baths for passengers on one of its liners—the Adriatic—in 1907. It was soon followed in 1913 by the Hamburg America Line (HAPAG) on its Imperator, and in 1930 by the Canadian Pacific Line on its Empress of Britain. White Star was proud of its innovation and the baths were mentioned in most of its publicity.

==== The Adriatic ====
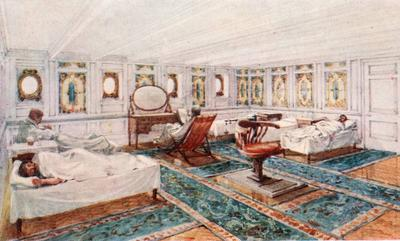
The original Adriatic cooling-room...

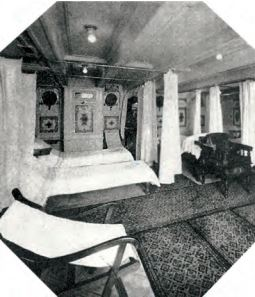
...& after 1928

The Turkish baths comprised hot and temperate rooms, a cooling-room, two shampooing rooms, and a plunge pool with an all-round needle douche. In addition to the rugs, couches, and seats in the cooling-room, there was also a mirrored dressing-table and a weighing-chair. Placed as close as possible to the hot room was the thermo tank containing coils of steam-filled pipes over which air was blown to heat it on its way through the hot rooms. Complementing the Turkish baths, and separated from them by a corridor, were three electric baths. (Note: In these early electric baths, the bather sat in a normal water-filled bath or tub while a very mild electric current was passed through wires placed in the water.) Tickets for the Turkish or electric baths had to be purchased at the ship's enquiry desk. Either type of bath cost five shillings and sixpence, or one dollar twenty-five cents. The baths were available to men and women at separate times, though fewer hours were allocated for women's use than for men's.

Both company and passengers must have been satisfied with the well-planned baths because when the ship was refurbished after World War I, and again in 1928 when it was converted to a cabin class liner, there were relatively few changes made. Because the electric baths had previously been under-used, one was converted into a dressing room, while space was made for a chiropodist in another one. Otherwise, apart from adding curtains round some of the couches, a larger dressing-table, and a more sophisticated weighing-chair, little else was altered.

==== The Olympic and Titanic ====
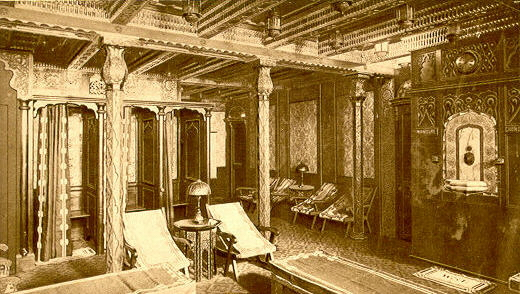
The Olympic Turkish bath cooling-room

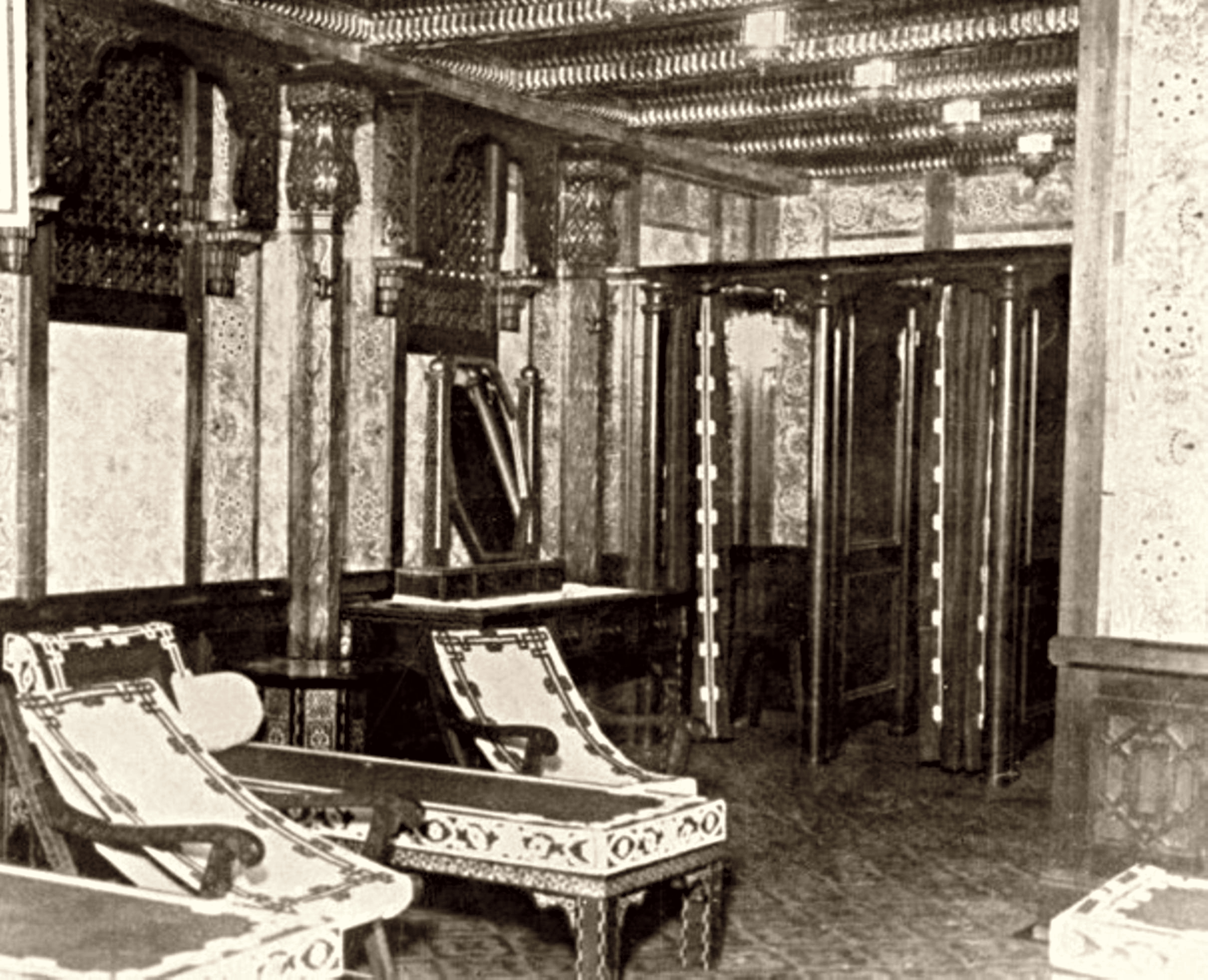
The Titanic's cooling-room

The midsummer issue of The Shipbuilder was a special number devoted to the two sister ships. The journal's description of the Turkish baths and their adjoining swimming pools applied, in all but the smallest detail, to both ships, though most of the images which survive are actually of the Olympic. Although the layout of the various rooms differed, each Turkish bath comprised a cooling-room, temperate and hot rooms, and two shampooing rooms with slabs and circular needle douches. There was no plunge pool such as the one on the Adriatic because of the adjacent swimming pool but, complementing the Turkish baths, each had a steam room and an electric bath. (Note: Unlike the electric baths on the Adriatic, this one (sometimes called a lamp bath) was an early type of sunbed in which the bather was warmed by the heat of the surrounding electric lamps. On the Olympic and Titanic, the bather would lie on the bed with the lid shut so that the whole body was enclosed apart from the head. Additional side lamps were then fitted before they were all switched on for a pre-determined time.)

By all published accounts, confirmed by the images of the Titanic brought up by James Cameron's 2012 dive to the wreck on the ocean bed, the cooling-room was one of the most extraordinary rooms in the ship.

The walls from the dado to the cornice are completely tiled in large panels of blue and green, surrounded by a broad band of tiles in a bolder and deeper hue. The ceiling cornice and beams are gilt, with the intervening panels picked out in dull red. From the panels are suspended bronze Arab lamps. A warm coloured teak has been adopted for the dado, doors, and panelling, and forms a perfect setting to the gorgeous effect of the [floor] tiles and ceiling. The stanchions, (Note: Upright bars, posts, or supports, as for a ship's deck.) also cased in teak, are carved all over with an intricate Moorish pattern, surmounted by a carved cap. Over the doors are small gilt domes, semi-circular in plan, with their soffits (Note: The underneath surface of building components) carved in low relief geometrical pattern. Low couches are placed around the walls with an inlaid Damascus table between each, upon which coffee and cigarettes or books may be placed. On one side is a handsome marble drinking fountain, set in a frame of tiles. A teak dressing table and mirror, with all its accessories, and a locker for valuables are also provided, while placed around the room are a number of canvas chairs.

Tickets for first class passengers wishing to take either Turkish or electric baths cost four shillings or one dollar, (Note: From time to time, surviving tickets appear at auction fetching huge sums) and were available for separate men's or women's sessions. Passengers on the Titanic were looked after by a team of three men (J B Crosbie, W Ennis, and L Taylor) none of whom was to survive the voyage, and two women (Annie Caton and Mrs Maud Slocombe), both of whom were more fortunate.

It seems fair to deduce that most passengers who took Turkish baths on the two liners were satisfied, hence the decision to include them later on the two Queens.

==== The Berengaria (originally the Imperator) ====
In 1913, the Hamburg America Line (HAPAG) brought its showpiece liner SS Imperator into service. But in 1919 it became part of the Cunard Line as compensation for the sinking of the Lusitania during World War I and was renamed RMS Berengaria.

The Turkish baths adjoined the ship's two-storey high Pompeian-style swimming pool. This was designed by Charles Mewès and inspired by a similar pool built in 1907 for the Royal Automobile Club, of which Mewès was also one of the architects. The Turkish baths comprised three hot rooms, a resting (or cooling–) room, dressing rooms, and two shampooing rooms. Complementing the Turkish baths were a number of electric cabinet baths, though it is not known exactly what type of electric baths these were.

The Berengaria's first Turkish bath supervisor was Arthur Mason, a professional masseur who had trained under Sir Robert Jones. Mason's young assistant in 1935, fifteen year old John Dempsey, later wrote a book about the Turkish baths on the White Star and Cunard liners in which he had worked. On the Berengaria, part of Dempsey's job was to show bathers to the changing cubicles and take them to the first hot room. Each was provided with towel, jug of drinking water and a glass.^{:pp. 5–11}

Next to the hot rooms was a shower with big-jet hose pipes. Stimulating and therapeutic, the jets were sprayed onto the bathers following their Turkish bath, after which they were helped to dry off, returned to their cubicle, covered with towels, and told to relax prior to their massage. The massage room had a central table, and raffia brushes were used to soap the bathers before their massage.

Many well-known males, including the Prince of Wales, took advantage of the facilities on the Berengaria. They included Johnny Weissmuller (the screen Tarzan), comedian Phil Silvers, actor George Arliss, Noël Coward, and H G Wells. There was no Turkish bath for women passengers.

==== The Queen Mary ====
After the installation of Turkish baths on the Berengaria and the first two 'Olympic' Class ships, Olympic and Titanic, White Star Line included them as a matter of course on the Britannic.^{:p. 230} But the third ship never welcomed paying passengers as it was taken into service as a hospital ship shortly after the beginning of World War I, and was sunk in November 1916.

RMS Queen Mary sailed between 1936 and 1968, mainly across the Atlantic Ocean. It was owned by the (now merged) Cunard-White Star Line until 1949, when ownership passed to the new Cunard Line. Arthur Mason was moved from the aged Berengaria to become the masseur on the new ship, and he soon asked for John Dempsey to become his assistant again.

The Turkish baths were on C Deck, with the main entrance opposite the First Class dining room, and a second smaller one from a balcony overlooking the two-deck high swimming pool.

The large frigidarium had eight cubicles, each with a bed, a locker with hangers, and large plush curtains which could be pulled across for privacy. Beyond the last cubicle, the shampooing room had two armour plated glass massage slabs, together with wash-basins and a shower. A passageway with a drinking-fountain at the end led to the three interconnected hot rooms on the pool side of the baths. These were maintained at temperatures ranging from 80 °F (27 °C) to 200 °F (93 °C), and had glass windows in their doors so that the attendants could check if anyone seemed unwell.

Complementing the Turkish baths were a Russian steam bath, an electric lamp bath, and an electric therapy room in which bathers could obtain ultra-violet, infrared, or diathermy treatments (Note: Diathermy uses localised heating of the body tissues with an electric current for medical purposes.) under the supervision of the nursing sister or dispenser.

Following the practice now prevailing on other liners, there were separate Turkish bath sessions for male and female passengers. But, as in most public baths, the hours were not evenly distributed.

During World War II, the Queen Mary was requisitioned as a troop carrier. For some years after the post-war refit and relaunch in 1946, it seemed as though things would soon be back to normal. But by the 1960s, the liner's usage figures were being examined very closely as travellers increasingly considered the advantages of speedy air travel.

==== The Queen Elizabeth ====
In March 1940, the newly built RMS Queen Elizabeth went into service as a troopship for the duration of World War II. In 1946, after a post-war refit, the liner sailed, mainly across the Atlantic Ocean, until 1968. It was initially owned by the merged Cunard-White Star Line until the company was succeeded in 1949 by the Cunard Line. John Dempsey was appointed to run the Turkish baths from the outset.

The facilities within the Turkish baths were similar to those on the Queen Mary but the layout was different, with the various areas on either side of a long corridor. This was around ten foot wide and was, in effect, the frigidarium. (Note: A rare photograph (D42/PR1/19/100) of the frigidarium from the Cunard Archive at the University of Liverpool Library is reproduced in) On the left were eight compartments which could be separated by curtains for privacy, each containing a bed, a combined mirrored dressing-table with cupboard below, and a bench seat.

The modern shower had jets of hot or icy cold water, and the shampooing room was fitted with two up-to-date tables with chrome surrounds and a two-inch armoured glass surface. There were three hot rooms: the tepidarium at 150 °F (66 °C), the caldarium at 175 °F (79 °C), and the smaller laconicum at 200 °F (93 °C).

Complementing the Turkish baths, and within the same area, were a Russian steam room, and a room with an electric lamp bath. The latter was so little used, however, that it was soon converted into a linen room.

The baths were open each day from 7.00am until 10.00am, and from 2.00pm until 7.00pm for the male passengers, and from 10.00am until 2.00pm, under the direction of Mrs Wilson (the masseuse) for female passengers. Passengers who used the Turkish baths usually booked for the whole voyage and, most often, at the same time every day.

==== Financial realities ====
By the beginning of the 1960s, the idea of leisurely trips across the Atlantic was increasingly affected by the growth of fast travel by air. Passenger numbers fell, and Cunard examined the costs of every aspect of their liner operation. On the Queen Mary, a Turkish bath with an alcohol rub cost 10s. A bath and rub on each of the three full days of the voyage cost only £1 5s 0d. (19)

A memo from Cunard's head office, dated 6 May 1963, noted that on the Queen Mary, the cost of the Turkish baths staff (two males, one female, and a boy) exceeded the receipts by £2,298 5s 0d; this was even more than the £1,971 5s 0d loss (with the same complement of staff) made on the slightly newer Queen Elizabeth. The writer, Mr T Laird, asked if overtime was being worked, and whether losing one member of staff and raising prices would improve the situation. Takings continued to decline for a further year.

It is not known whether any changes were actually made to the level of staffing or to the basic price of a Turkish bath, but by this time Cunard would already have been considering whether to continue the liners in service.

When new ships were built to cater for 21st century holiday cruises, none included Victorian-style Turkish baths. Sauna, steam room and wellness spas had become the new essential facility.

== The Victorian Turkish bath today ==
=== The decline of the Victorian Turkish bath ===
The rapid rise of the Victorian Turkish in the second half of the 19th century was due to the impact of a number of factors including the cholera epidemics of the previous decades, the permissive (rather than mandatory) Public Baths and Wash-houses Acts of the 1840s, the lack of even basic washing facilities in overcrowded homes, and the lack of medical knowledge during a 19th-century which was still without safe basic pain killers.

The Victorian Turkish bath offered personal cleansing opportunities, usage as a therapy, (especially for complaints such as rheumatism and gout), and a leisure activity for those with money and time enough to take advantage of it. This was evident as early as 1861 when a group of 221 men visiting the newly opened City Baths in London were asked why they had come. Only 67 hoped to ease or cure an ailment, 154 (c.70%) went because they enjoyed it, while none admitted to using it for personal cleansing.

In the 20th century, the gradual rise in the number of homes with hot and cold running water lessened the need for using the bath as a personal cleansing agent. The increasing effectiveness of drugs as painkillers and (following World War II) as curative agents, together with an exponential growth in medical knowledge, had virtually ended the use of the Turkish bath as a therapy.

During the interwar period, the bath was seen more as a leisure activity, and some local authorities, for example, Cardiff (1958), Blackpool (1965), and Nottingham (1975), were still opening them after World War II.

But post-war rising fuel and staffing costs made running Victorian Turkish baths more expensive. Cheaper alternatives, such as the free-standing Finnish sauna and the prefabricated plastic steam room, became available. Although neither of these alternatives provides the same type of sweating experience as the Victorian Turkish bath, the experience was close enough to satisfy the post-war generation. The new self-contained baths were soon regarded as ideal facilities for incorporating into hotels, health clubs, and wellness centres.

That such baths gained such rapid popularity is due in no small measure to the earlier acceptance of the Victorian Turkish bath which, over time, seamlessly transitioned to the less expensively provided forms of hot-air bath. The Victorian Turkish bath, which the new baths are replacing, is a component of that part of hydropathy which has moved from being a medical treatment to a leisure activity.

=== Repurposed Victorian Turkish baths ===
As a result of the post-World War II decline in the use of Victorian Turkish baths, and their replacement by sauna and steam rooms, very few Victorian baths remain. In the British Isles, those that existed in hotels, or were converted shops and houses, have, over time, been reconverted into other uses. Some of those which had the most original interiors, such as Charles Fitzroy Doll's extravagant 1913 Imperial Turkish Baths, have been demolished. J Hatchard Smith's 1882 Dalston Junction Turkish Baths, one of the very few where the exterior was designed to give the impression of a hammam or a mosque, was destroyed in a fire barely eight years after it opened.

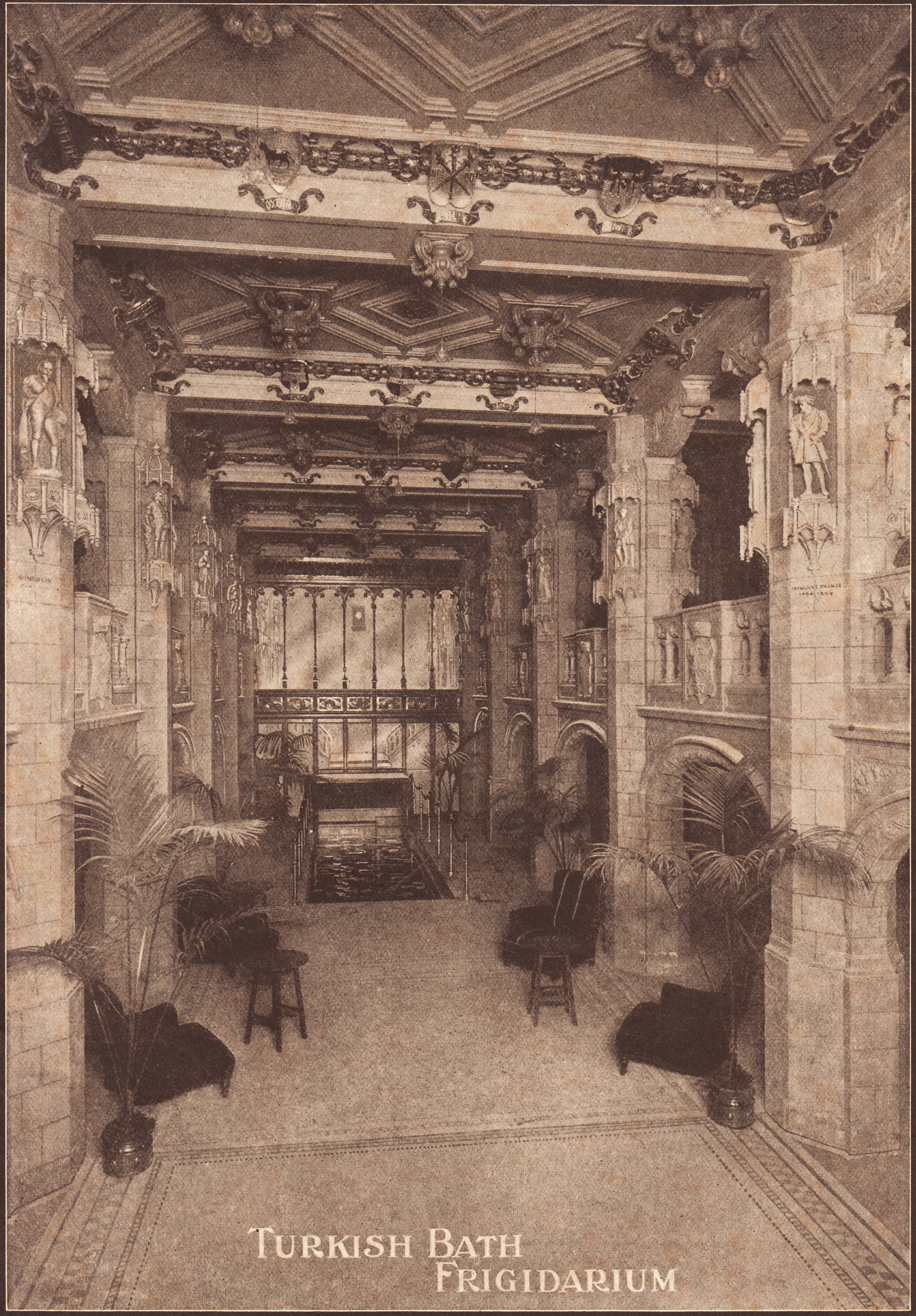
Charles Fitzroy Doll's Imperial Turkish Baths. Tepidarium and plunge pool

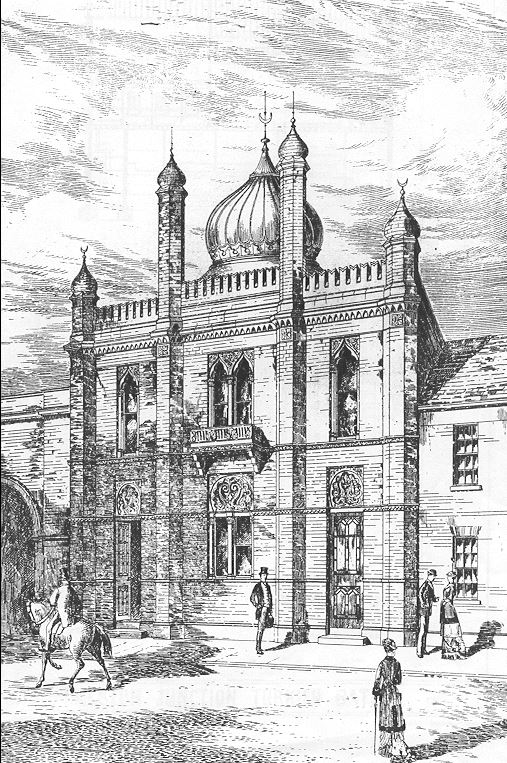
J Hatchard Smith's Dalston Junction Baths. Exterior view, 1880

Nevertheless, the lavish decorative style of some of the 19th century Turkish baths can still be seen in a few isolated instances. This is when the baths buildings, although now used for other purposes, still retain much of their original structure: such buildings as, for example, the restaurant at the former Turkish baths at 30 South Mall in Cork; a business centre built within the shell of Ashton-under-Lyne's Municipal swimming pool and Turkish baths, and a stockbroker's office with its colourful dome and vaulted ceilings at Friar Lane, Leicester. (Note: The Victorian Turkish Baths website includes illustrated pages on the Turkish baths which originally stood on the two sites in Cork and Leicester.) The Cork building is recorded in the Irish National Inventory of Architectural Heritage, and the two English buildings are Listed in the National Heritage List for England.

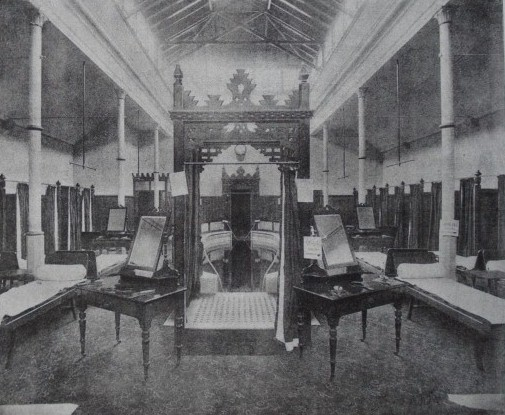
The New Turkish baths at 30 South Mall, Cork. Cooling-room and plunge

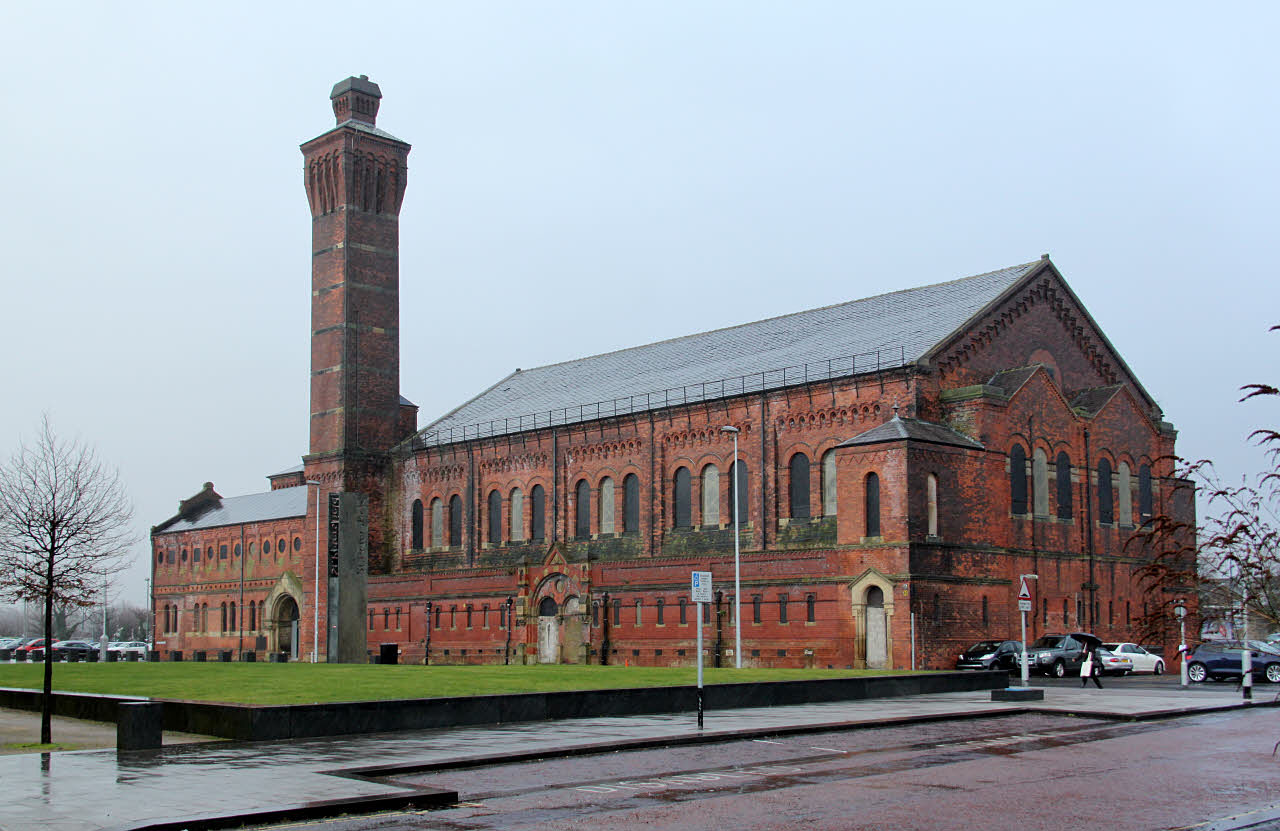
Ashton Turkish baths (beyond chimney). Building in 21st century

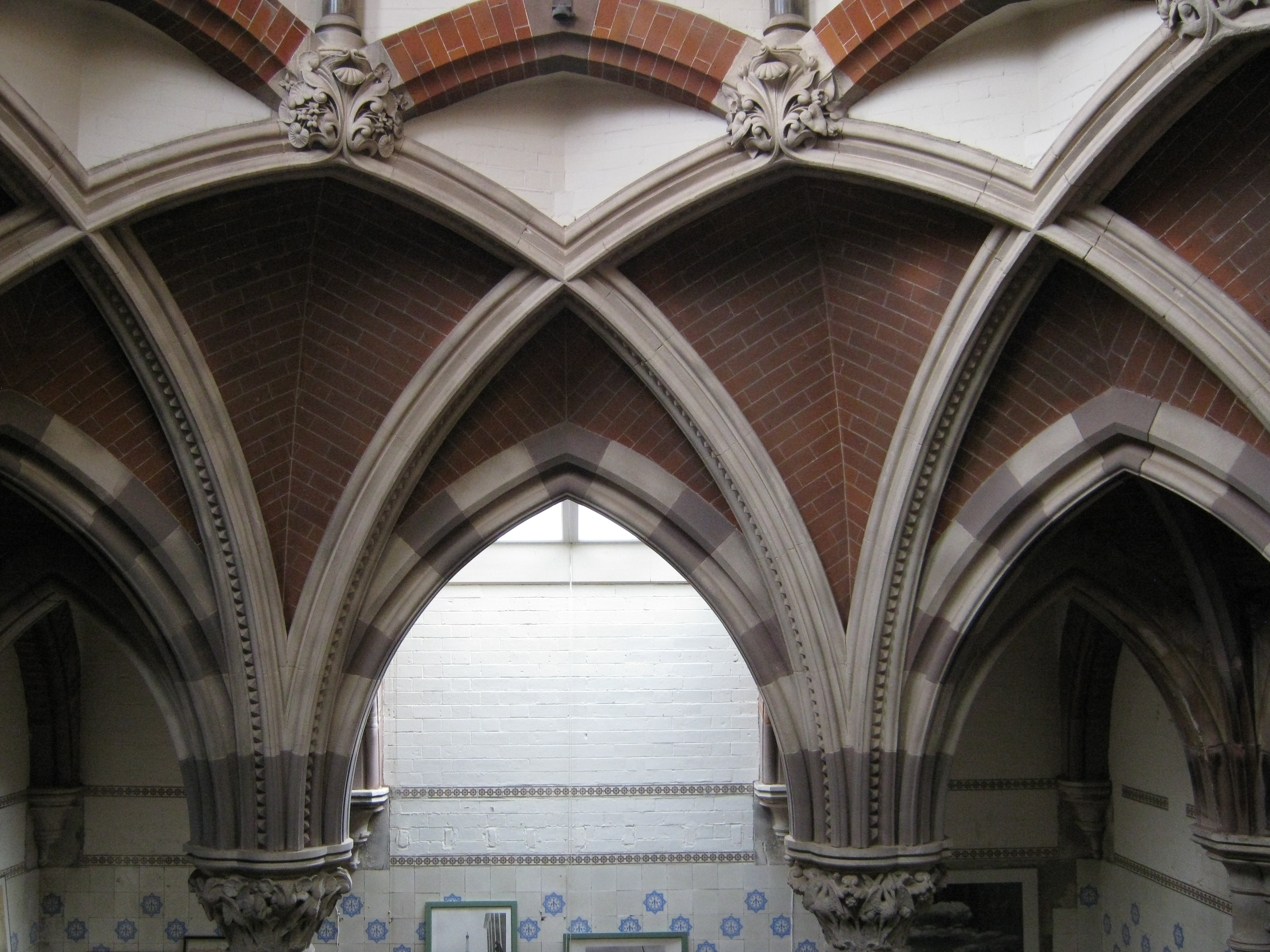
New Turkish Baths, Friar Lane, Leicester. Stockbroker's office 2006

=== Victorian and Victorian-style Turkish baths still in use ===
As of January 2026, there were just eleven Victorian or Victorian-style Turkish baths remaining open in Britain:

- Victorian Turkish baths, Harrogate
- Ironmonger Row Baths, London
- York Hall Leisure Centre, London
- The Porchester Centre, London
- Royal Automobile Club, London
- Newcastle City Baths
- Mounts Baths, Northampton
- Victorian Turkish baths, Swindon (temporarily closed for refurbishment)
- Portobello Swim Centre, Edinburgh
- Arlington Baths Club, Glasgow
- Western Baths Club, Glasgow

There are also three Victorian or Victorian-style Turkish baths currently known still to be open in Europe:

- Römisch-Irische Bad im Friedrichsbad, Baden-Baden, Germany
- Müller'sches Volksbad, Munich, Germany
- Das Römisch-Irische Bad, Wiesbaden, Germany

== See also ==
- Banya
- Hammam
- Sauna

== Primary bibliography ==
- Allsop, Robert Owen (1891), The hydropathic establishment and its baths, Spon
- Allsop, Robert Owen (1890), The Turkish bath: its design and construction, Spon (Deals only with the Victorian Turkish bath)
- Cosgrove, J. J. (2001) [1913], Design of the Turkish bath, Books for Business, ISBN 978-0-89499-078-6 (Deals only with the Victorian Turkish bath)
- Shifrin, Malcolm (2015), Victorian Turkish baths, Swindon: Historic England, ISBN 978-1-84802-230-0
