= Swindon Arts Centre =

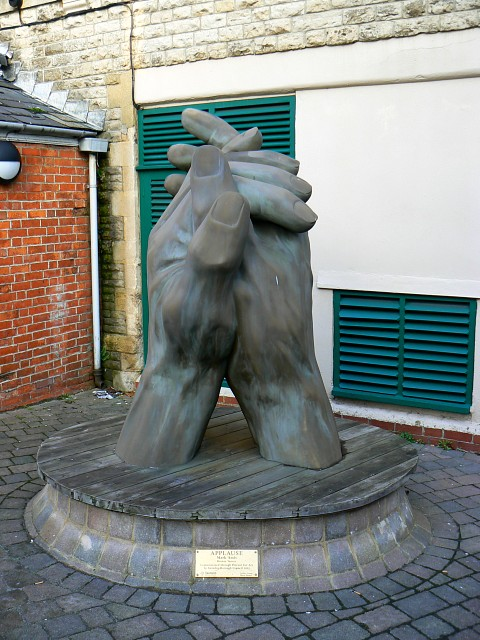
- Interactive map of Swindon Arts Centre
- Address: Devizes Road; Swindon
- Coordinates: 51.5517°N 1.7769°W
- Capacity: 212

Swindon Arts Centre is a 212-seat entertainment venue in the Old Town area of Swindon, Wiltshire, England. It opened in 1956.

The Swindon Arts Centre is at the heart of Swindon's Old Town, on Devizes Road. The venue hosts a varied programme of entertainment all year round, made up of both professional and amateur productions.

== Opening ==
The current Swindon Arts Centre was opened officially on Saturday 1 September 1956 by the mayor, N V Toze and Llewelyn Wyn Griffith, vice-chairman of the Arts Council of Great Britain. Prior to this date there had been an Arts Centre in the former Methodist Hall in the town centre, some ten years earlier.

== Refurbishments ==
The Swindon Arts Centre reopened in January 2003 following its refurbishment. Improvements included the addition of a lift in the new entrance foyer to give easy access to the auditorium on the first floor, new accessible toilets and new seats in the auditorium.

In 2010 the venue underwent a major refurbishment. The ground floor was completely redesigned to create a new performance studio, bar and cafe, and the refurbishment also made room for the Swindon Old Town public library to relocate into the building.

== Management ==
The theatre is managed by Trafalgar Theatres on behalf of Swindon Borough Council.

Theatre managers and directors include:

- Theatre Manager – Clarry Bean (1994–2013)
- Theatre Manager – Darren Edwards (2013–2015)
- Theatre Manager – Elly Stimpson Duffy (2015–2019)
- Theatre Director – Laura James (2019 – present)

In early 2015, Swindon Borough Council awarded the management contract to run Swindon Arts Centre to HQ Theatres & Hospitality who would run the venue in conjunction with the Wyvern Theatre.

== Patron ==
In November 2010, television personality Richard Digance became the first Patron of the venue. Pam Ayres is the Patron of the Friends of Swindon Arts Centre.

== See also ==
- Swindon Museum and Art Gallery
- Swindon Festival of Literature
