= Swindon Law Courts =

Court building in Swindon, England

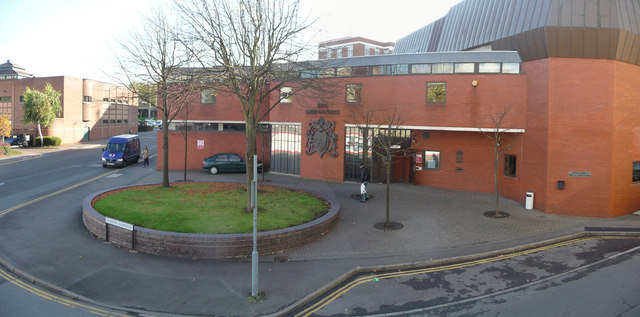
- Swindon Law Courts

- Shown in Wiltshire
- 51.5612°N 1.7820°W
- Location: Islington Street, Swindon

History
- Built: 1985

Site notes
- Architect: Property Services Agency
- Architectural style: Modernist style

Swindon Law Courts, also known as Swindon Combined Court Centre, is a Crown Court venue which deals with criminal cases, as well as a County Court venue, which deals with civil cases, in Islington Street, Swindon, England.

== History ==
For much of the 19th century, petty session hearings in Swindon were held in the Goddard Arms on the High Street, then, after it opened in the mid-1850s, in the Old Town Hall, and then, after it opened in 1891, in the New Town Hall. The lack of dedicated judicial facilities was temporarily resolved when the new Courts of Justice (now referred to as Swindon Magistrates' Court), designed by the borough architect, were opened in Princes Street on 21 April 1965.

However, as the number of court cases in Swindon grew, it became necessary to commission dedicated facilities for both Crown Court hearings, which require courtrooms suitable for trial by jury, and for County Court hearings. The site selected, on the west side of Islington Street, had previously been occupied by a row of terraced houses.

The new building was designed by the Property Services Agency in the Modernist style, built in red brick at a cost of £2.4 million, and was opened in 1985. The design involved an asymmetrical main frontage at the corner of Islington Street and Gordon Gardens. The corner of the building was recessed to create pedestrian access to the building and space for a flower bed and trees, and involved a section which was canted across the central part of the recess. There was a blind wall in the central bay to which a Royal coat of arms was fixed. The bays on either side of the central bay were glazed at ground floor level, with the glazed bay to the right forming the main entrance. The building was fenestrated by two square casement windows to the right of the entrance and by four square casement windows on the first floor. Internally, the building was laid out to accommodate seven courtrooms.

Notable cases have included the trial and conviction of Damien Bendall, in June 2021, for arson, for which he received a suspended sentence. He went on to murder his partner, Terri Harris, and her three children, using a claw hammer.
