= History of local government in Swindon =

History of the Swindon local government

The history of local government in Swindon has its origins in the Middle Ages. After a long period of very little change, there followed a new era, beginning in the 19th century, of constant redevelopment and re-adjustment.

== Parliamentary representation ==
The first recorded Members of Parliament in Swindon's history are John Ildhelfe and Richard Pernaunt. In 1295 they were elected into the Model Parliament of King Edward I. Others noted are Richard Neel (the 43rd parliament of Edward I in 1304) and Thomas and Robert Crekkelade (Henry VI's first parliament in 1422).

Swindon became part of the constituency of Cricklade in 1660, the constituency later being represented by lords of the manor, members of the Goddard family, and also Daniel Gooch of the Great Western Works.

In 1918, the parliamentary constituency of Cricklade was abolished and the Swindon constituency was formed.

In 1997, the parliamentary constituency of Swindon was divided into North Swindon and South Swindon, each with one member of parliament.

=== Parliamentary constituencies ===
- Cricklade (UK Parliament constituency) 1660–1918
- Swindon (UK Parliament constituency) 1918–1997
- North Swindon (UK Parliament constituency) 1997–present
- South Swindon (UK Parliament constituency) 1997–present

== Local government ==
From the 16th century to the 17th, Swindon was governed by a vestry – men who were elected from qualifying residents of means. They were mostly responsible for the work of the parish officers, financial matters affecting the church and the poor relief.

In 1849, Old Swindon petitioned unsuccessfully to be given a Local Board under the Public Health Act 1848 (11 & 12 Vict. c. 63), but the town remained a civil parish for a further fifteen years.

In 1864, following the possibility of Swindon and Highworth being merged, the Local Government Act 1858 was applied to both New and Old Swindon, with each area setting up its own local administration. The New Swindon Local Board held its first meeting on 27 April 1864 at the Mechanics' Institute, with the GWR's William Frederick Gooch as chairman. The Old Swindon Local Board met for the first time on 10 August 1865 at the Town Hall, Old Swindon, with a grocer, Phillip Hawe Mason, as chairman.

In 1889, Wiltshire County Council had been formed to take responsibility for several strategic local government services in the whole of Wiltshire. Swindon came under its authority at this level for more than a hundred years, until the creation of its own unitary authority in 1997. Until then, it was represented in the county council by several county councillors. One of these, John Lindow Calderwood, was chairman of the county council from 1949 to 1960.

The local boards remained in existence until 1894, when they were both converted into Urban District Councils. In 1900 the Swindon New Town and Old Swindon urban districts were merged, to form a single municipal borough of Swindon. On 1 April 1974, the Local Government Act 1972 created a non-metropolitan district of Thamesdown, consisting of Swindon along with the former Highworth Rural District. The name alludes to the two natural boundaries of the region, the River Thames to the north and the Wiltshire and Marlborough Downs to the south. The name itself was described as "absurd and universally unpopular".

On 1 April 1997, Thamesdown became a unitary authority independent of Wiltshire County Council, following a review by the Local Government Commission for England. The resulting new authority was renamed the Borough of Swindon soon afterwards, but the name 'Thamesdown' is still used for some purposes. The local bus company was called Thamesdown Transport until its sale by the Council in February 2017 to the Go-Ahead Group.

=== David Murray John ===
David Murray John OBE became Swindon town clerk in 1937, and later was the architect of the town's post-war growth. He engendered diversity of jobs in Swindon so that the town would not rely solely on the railway for employment.

After the Town Development Act 1952 was passed, the council was able to make a persuasive case for Swindon as an overspill district, ideally suited to accommodate a good number of London's jobless. The Act provided for rehousing subsidies, compulsory purchase of land and financial assistance from governments to provide local amenities and services.

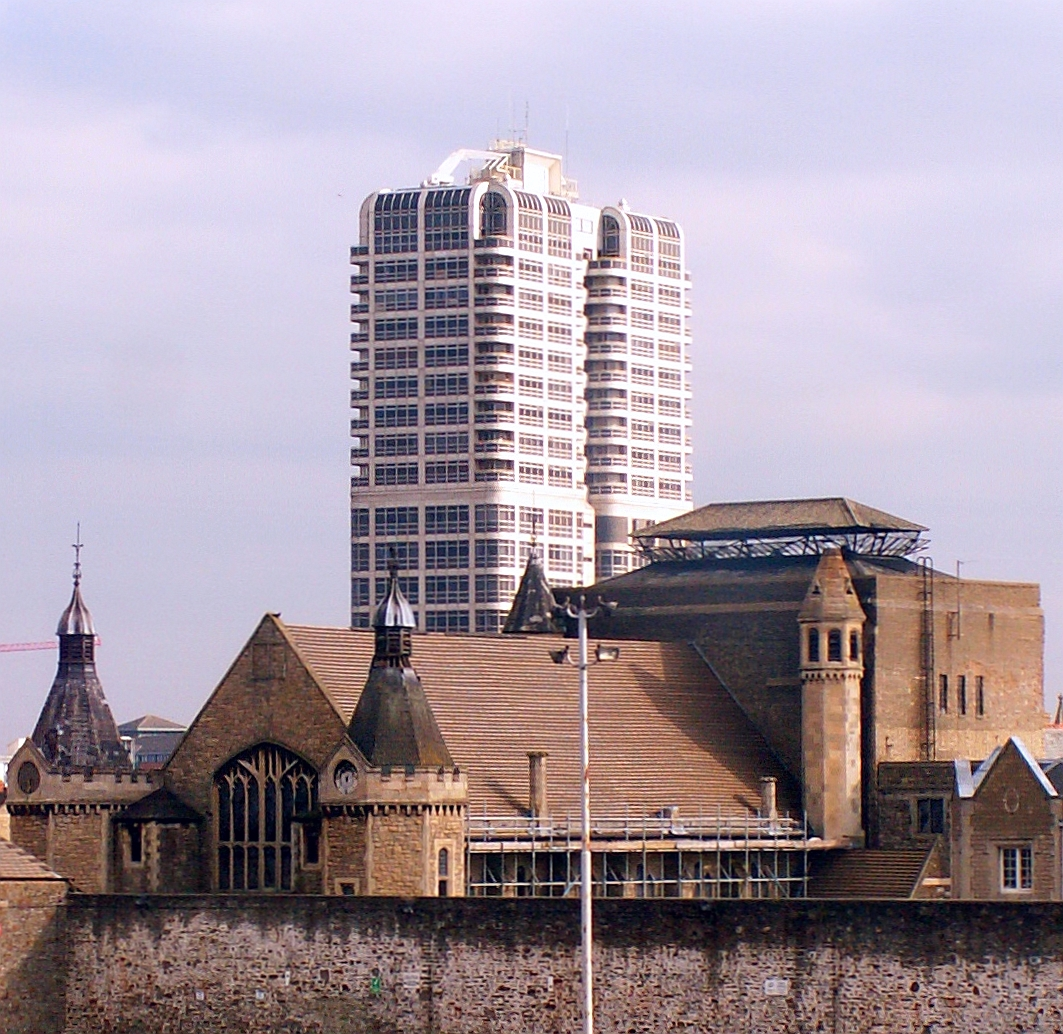
The David Murray John Tower in Swindon, overlooking the Mechanics Institute

With negotiations successful between Swindon Council, London County Council and the Borough of Tottenham, Murray John and his officers proceeded with a series of diversifications that eventually expanded the town's industrial base and helped the local economy, while increasing the stock of available council housing. The companies of Plessey and Vickers assisted by agreeing to employ over 1,500 of those moving to Swindon; the Council funded the creation of industrial estates and housing developments. In the period 1951–1981, Swindon's population grew by 70 percent, "some 58 per cent higher than the national average over the same period". In the 1980s, Swindon became the fastest growing town in Europe.

Murray John died in 1974 and is honoured in the name of the David Murray John Tower in the centre of Swindon. Built in 1976, it rises to a height of 83 metres (272 ft) and is the tallest building in the town.

=== Civil parishes ===
The former municipal borough was unparished. An Order effective April 2017 created the civil parishes of Central Swindon North and Central Swindon South, the boundary between them being the Great Western main line. The parish council of the latter parish styled itself as Swindon South Parish Council, and in 2023 officially changed its name.

== City status ==
In 1993 Swindon Borough Council and the Swindon Chamber of Commerce unveiled a joint public relations venture "Swindon – City for the 21st Century" to raise awareness of the town and gauge public opinion for a potential bid for city status. The partnership mounted an exhibition in London but the project stalled.

By the 1990s, Swindon had become one of the most important centres along the M4 Corridor. During this period the town continued to attract new, predominantly hi-tech, companies to the town and encouraged relocation. However the town's infrastructure and amenities did not develop to the same level.

The borough council made formal bids for city status in 1999 and 2002 but both were unsuccessful.

To overcome the problems raised at the failed city bids, the town council invited an Urban Regeneration Company into the town to oversee the blueprint for revitalising much of the town centre.

== See also ==
- History of local government in the United Kingdom
- Swindon Town Hall
- History of Swindon
