= Swindon Civic Offices =

Municipal building in Swindon, Wiltshire, England

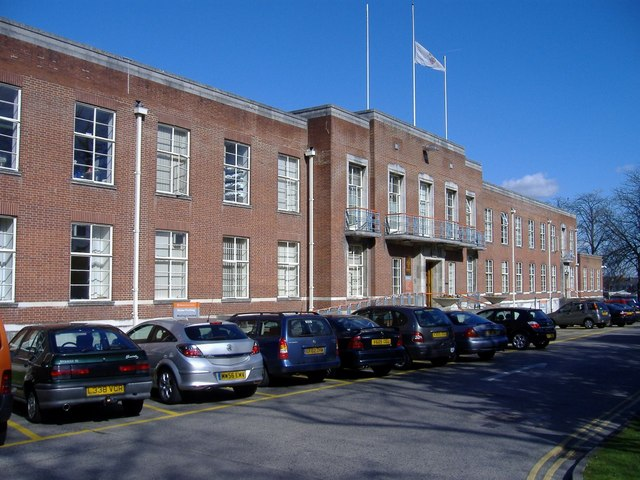
- The civic offices in March 2007

- Shown in Wiltshire
- 51.5602°N 1.7781°W
- Location: Swindon, Wiltshire, England

History
- Built: 1938

Site notes
- Architect(s): Bertram, Bertram and Rice
- Architectural style: Moderne style

Listed Building – Grade II
- Designated: 13 March 2020
- Reference no.: 1467731

Swindon Civic Offices is a 1938 municipal building in Euclid Street in Swindon, England. The building is Grade II listed, and is home to the Register Office, meeting place of Swindon Borough Council and the Swindon Museum & Art Gallery.

== History ==
The building was commissioned to replace Swindon Town Hall at Regent Circus which was no longer adequate to accommodate the needs of the Swindon Corporation. The site the corporation selected was a former recreation ground belonging to the Clarence Street School. Following a design competition involving 67 firms of architects, Bertram, Bertram and Rice were selected as the preferred bidder. The new building was designed in the Moderne style, built in red brick and was officially opened by Prince Henry, Duke of Gloucester on 5 July 1938.

The design involved a symmetrical main frontage of 29 bays facing onto Euclid Street. The building was laid out with a two-storey central section of five bays, which was slightly projected forward, a pair of two-storey wings of nine bays each, and a pair of single-storey end sections of three bays each. The middle three bays of the central section, which were even further projected forward, featured a short flight of steps leading up to a square-headed doorway, with a stone surround and a keystone, which was flanked by two small casement windows. There were three casement windows with stone surroundings and a balcony on the first floor. The windows in the outer bays of the central section also had stone surrounds, but the rest of the building was fenestrated with plain casement windows. Internally, the rates office was in one wing, while the offices for the town clerk and the mayor were in the other wing. The council chamber, the mayor's chamber, and the principal committee room were in the central section.

As the responsibilities of the council increased, a new office building was erected to the north of the civic offices, facing on Beckhampton Street, in 1965. The civic offices continued to serve as the headquarters of the corporation and remained the meeting place for the enlarged Thamesdown Borough Council when it was formed in 1974. After the Clarence Street School closed in the 1980s, that building was annexed to provide extra accommodation for council staff. Further accommodation became available when Wat Tyler House was erected to the northwest of the civic offices, facing on Beckhampton Street, in 1988. A granite plaque, to commemorate the lives of the leaders of the Peasants' Revolt, Wat Tyler and John Ball, was installed in Beckhampton Street in 1990. The council became Swindon Borough Council when it took on new responsibilities as the unitary authority for the area in 1997.

Following the closure of its former home at Apsley House in Old Town, Museum & Art Swindon relocated to the first floor of the Civic Offices in 2024.
