= Amanda Ansell =

English artist (born 1976)

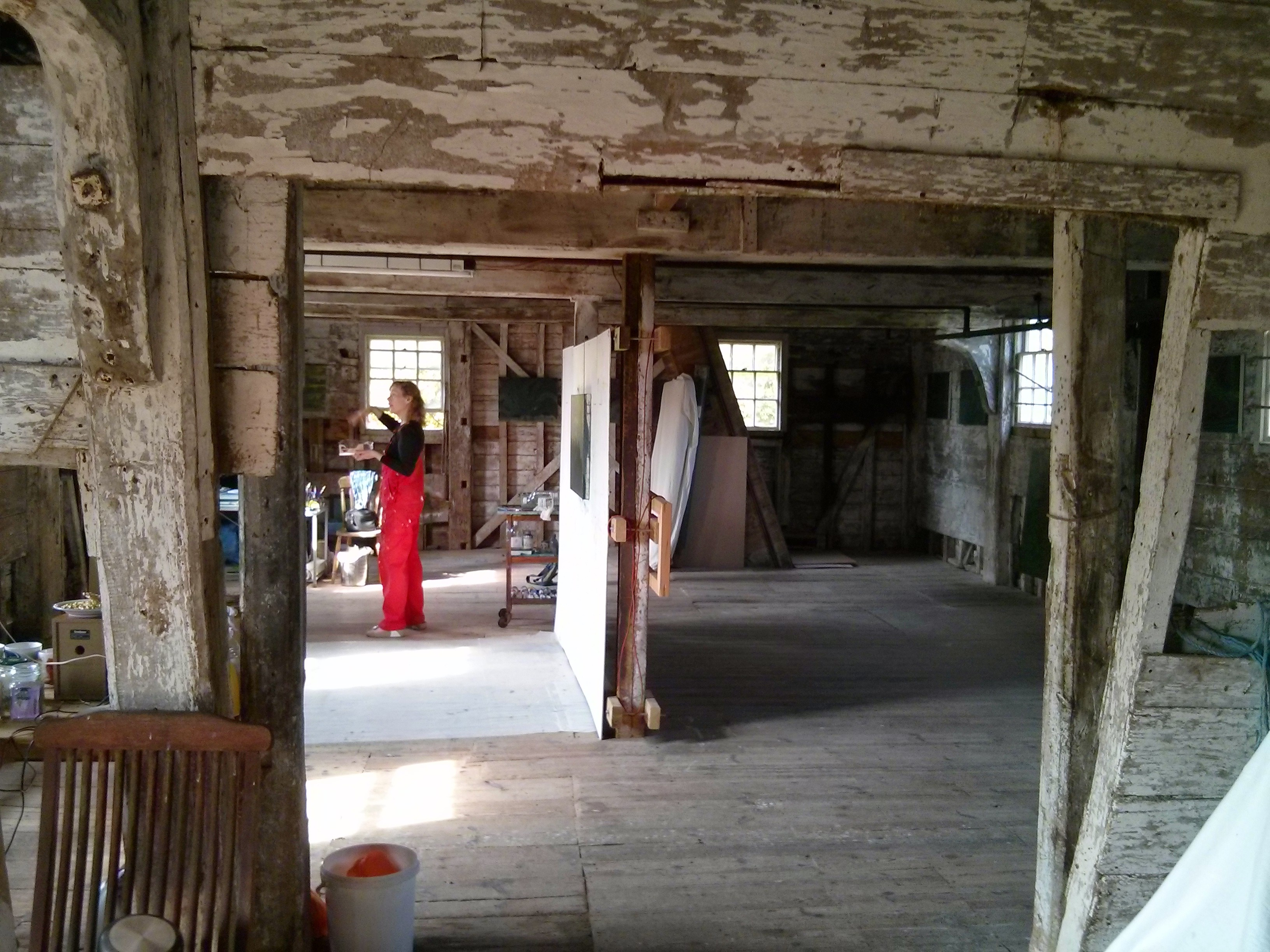
- Amanda Ansell in her studio, 2014
- Born: 1976 (age 49–50); Sudbury, England
- Occupation: Artist
- Website: www.amandaansell.co.uk

Amanda Ansell (born 1976) is an English artist. She studied Fine Art at Norwich University of the Arts between 1995 and 1998 and then at the Slade School of Fine Art, University College London from 1998 to 2000. After living in London for seven years, she returned to her native Suffolk in 2006 to begin an artist residency at Firstsite, Colchester. The same year, a body of work was selected for exhibition at Kettles Yard, Cambridge and she was nominated for Jerwood Contemporary Painters.

Her paintings are abstract and make use of a limited palette to explore the relationship between artist and nature.

== Selected exhibitions ==
=== Group ===
- “Royal Academy Summer Exhibition” Royal Academy of Arts, London (2018)
- “Contemporary Masters from Britain: 80 British Painters of the 21st Century” Yantai Art Museum (2017), Jiangsu Art Gallery (2017) and Tianjin Academy of Fine Arts (2017 – 2018)
- “Anything Goes” Bermondsey Project Space (2017)
- “The London Group Open Exhibition” The London Group (2015)
- “@Paintbritain” Ipswich Museum (2014)
- “Contemporary British Painting” Huddersfield Art Gallery (2014)
- “Contemporary British Painting” The Crypt, St Marylebone Parish Church, London (2013)
- “Hiraki Sawa, Tessa Farmer and Amanda Ansell” Firstsite, Colchester (2006)

=== Solo ===
- “River” The Oasis Gallery, Essex (2018)
- “Rearranging Curves” Westminster Reference Library (2016)

== Selected collections ==
- East Contemporary Art Collection, University of Suffolk
- Jiangsu Arts and Crafts Museum, Artall Nanjing, China
- Swindon Art Gallery
- The Priseman Seabrook Collection
