= Museum & Art Swindon =

Art gallery and museum in Swindon, England

Coordinates: 51.5601°N 1.778°W

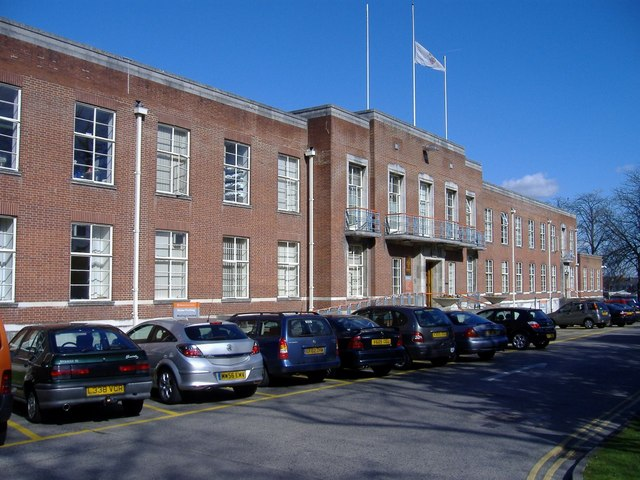
The Civic Offices building in 2007

Museum & Art Swindon, formerly Swindon Museum and Art Gallery, is a museum and gallery in Swindon, England. It is run by Swindon Borough Council and since 2024 has been housed within the council's offices at Euclid Street, Swindon.

== History ==
The Swindon Art Gallery collection was established in 1944 by a local benefactor, H. J. P. Bomford, through a significant donation of artworks. Until June 2021 it was displayed in Apsley House, a 19th-century former house on the corner of Bath Road and Victoria Road in Swindon's Old Town, but had to leave when Swindon Borough Council decided in the summer of 2021 that the building was no longer suitable and required major repairs; it had been closed to the public since March 2020 in response to the COVID-19 pandemic. The collection was placed in storage, and the council stated their commitment to the long term future of the institution.

The facility reopened in July 2024 under a new name, Museum & Art Swindon, after the council spent £520,000 converting the first floor of its Civic Offices building at Euclid Street. The building, completed in 1939, is described by Historic England as "a striking and well-realised Moderne design".

== Collection ==
The collection focuses on major artists and movements of 20th and 21st century British art, with several works presented by the Art Fund and the Contemporary Art Society. Artists in the collection include Simon Carter, Amanda Ansell, Ben Nicholson, Henry Moore, Lucian Freud, Graham Sutherland, L S Lowry, Paul Nash, Steven Pippin, Terry Frost, Roger Hilton, Howard Hodgkin, John Hoyland, Richard Hamilton, Gwen John, Augustus John, Maggi Hambling, John Bellany, Tony Bevan, Ivon Hitchens, John Piper, Christopher le Brun, Dennis Creffield, Grayson Perry, William Turnbull and Ken White. The media include paintings, photography and studio pottery.

At its former Apsley House venue, the museum had on display local archaeology, geology, and history. Displays presented Swindon's geological Jurassic history, its association with the Roman Empire, and the town's social history.

== Events ==
Swindon Museum and Art Gallery was one of the venues for the annual Swindon Festival of Literature.
