= Old Town Hall, Swindon =

Municipal building in Swindon, Wiltshire, England

The Old Town Hall
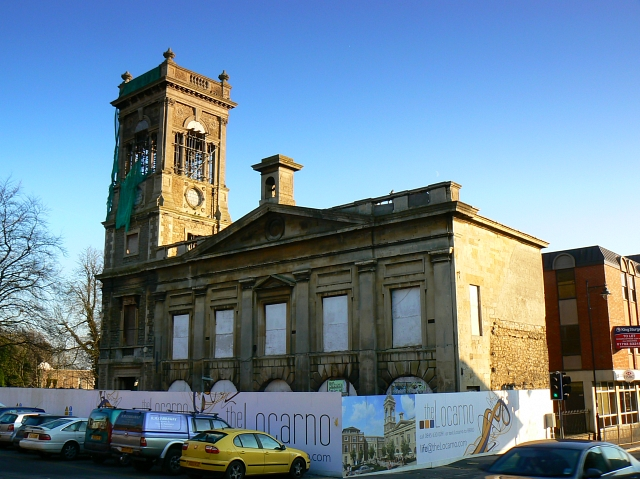
- The Old Town Hall

- Shown in Wiltshire
- 51.5512°N 1.7731°W
- Location: Swindon

History
- Built: 1854

Site notes
- Architect(s): Sampson Sage and E Robertson
- Architectural style: Neoclassical style

Listed Building – Grade II
- Designated: 2 October 1951
- Reference no.: 1023523

The Old Town Hall, also known as The Locarno or Locarno Ballroom, is a former municipal building of 1854 in the High Street, Swindon, Wiltshire, England. It is a Grade II listed building.

== History ==
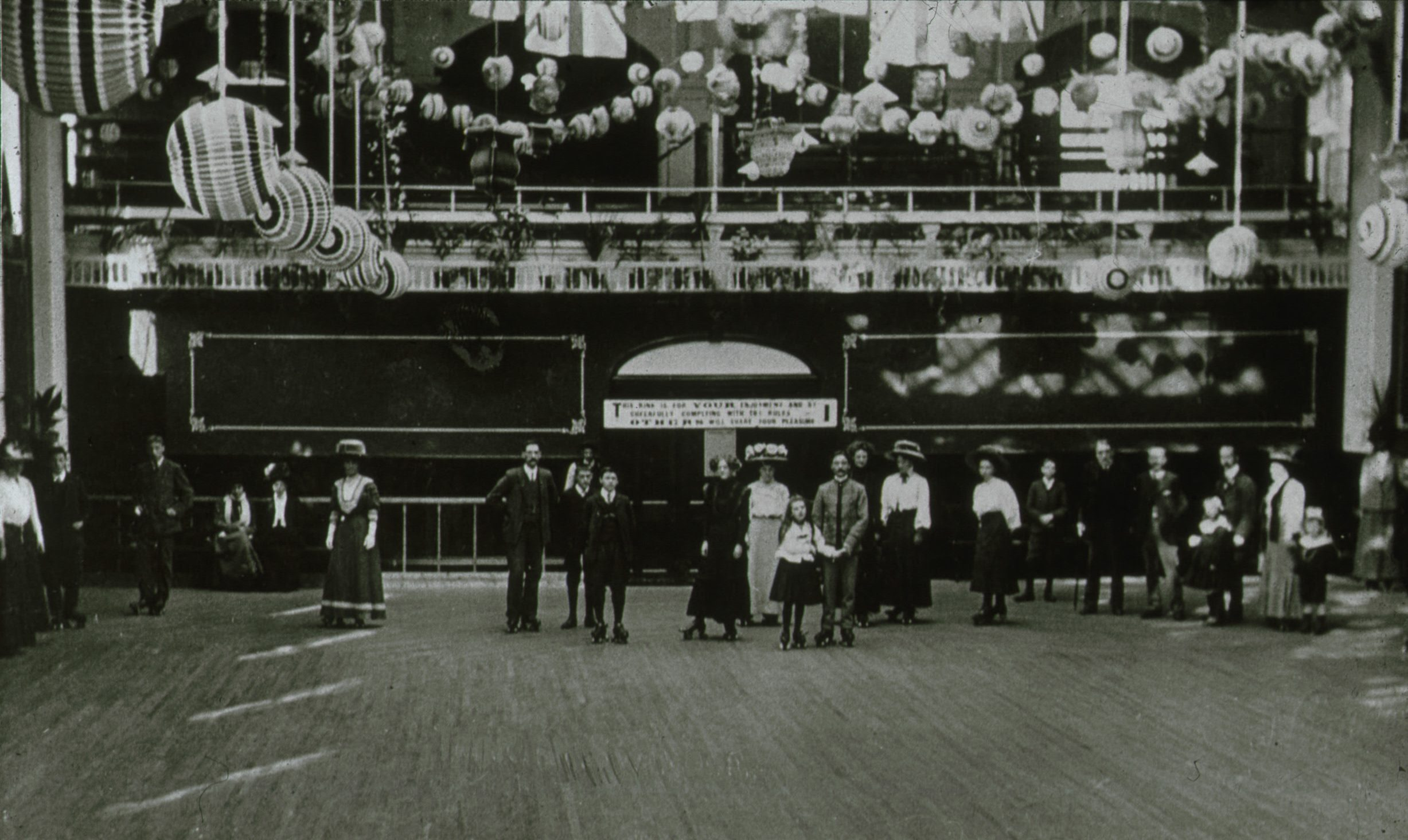
The interior of the Ballroom in the 1900s, showing the roller rink

Until the construction of the town hall on the High Street, the town council had met in the Goddard Arms on the High Street. This small pub had been owned by the Goddard family since 1621 and was a small cottage alehouse known as the Crown until 1820. The Goddard Arms was used for public meetings in the early 19th century and was used in this way by Ambrose Goddard to report progress on the Wilts & Berks Canal.

The town hall was designed by Sampson Sage and E Robertson in the neoclassical style, built in ashlar stone by a local builder, George Major, and was completed in 1854. The main frontage has five bays separated by full-height Tuscan order pilasters, with arched windows on the ground floor, casement windows on the first floor and a pediment and roof lantern above.

The building was extended to the northeast with a tower, as well as accommodation for a corn exchange at ground floor level, to the designs of Wilson and Willcox of Bath in 1866. A wine store was built on an adjoining site and its upper hall was used as a magistrates' court from 1871 to 1891.

After civic functions transferred to the new town hall in 1891, the building became a roller skating rink in 1910, and a cinema known as the Rink in 1919. After the Second World War it was refurbished and re-opened as the Locarno Dance Hall. Performers at the dance hall included the singer, Cilla Black, in April 1964, followed by the rock bands, The Yardbirds in July 1964, The Who in October 1965, The Small Faces in November 1965 and Fleetwood Mac in November 1968. After the last concert was held in 1970, the building served as a bingo hall but became vacant in the mid-1980s.

The building was acquired by bar owner, Gael Mackenzie, in 1999. Major fires occurred in the building in May 2003 and again in May 2004. In November 2016, Swindon council entered into a development agreement with Swindon Corn Exchange Limited, a business managed by housebuilder, Steve Rosier, under which Rosier agreed to pursue a development on the site. However, after no progress was made with the development and the building continued to decay, the Victorian Society added the structure to its list of most endangered buildings in September 2019. The council also threatened to use a compulsory purchase order to re-acquire the property in January 2020.
