= Henry Levett =

English physician

Dr Henry Levett (c.1668 – 2 July 1725) was an English physician who wrote a pioneering tract on the treatment of smallpox and served as chief physician at the Charterhouse, London.

== Early life ==
Henry Levett was born in about 1668, the son of William Levett Esq. of Swindon and Savernake Forest, Wiltshire, courtier to King Charles I of England, who accompanied the King during his imprisonment and to his eventual execution.

Levett was educated at Charterhouse School, and then attended Magdalen College, Oxford, in 1686 at the age of 17. He graduated with an M.D. from Oxford in 1699.

== Career ==
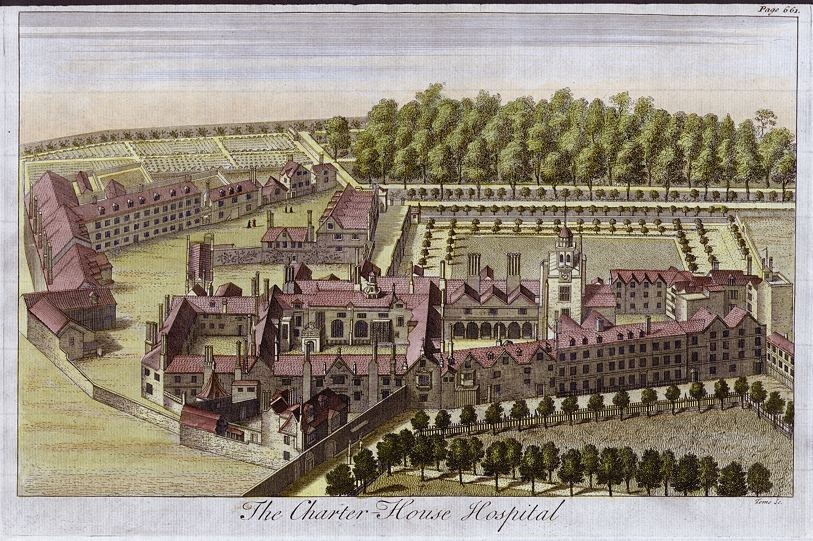
The Charterhouse, London

Levett settled in London, where he was elected physician to St. Bartholomew's Hospital in 1707 and became physician to the nearby Charterhouse in 1713, an early pioneer of the connection between the two institutions. He was also a ground-breaking doctor. In 1710 he wrote a paper at the request of Dr John Freind urging the use of "cathartics" (purgatives) in treating smallpox. Levett had made a study of two cases, and refers to those in his treatise, written in Latin, which Freind reprinted in its entirety in his collected works of 1733.

Levett is also believed have authored the short memoir of Dr William Wagstaffe, a well-known physician of the age. Levett's work on Wagstaffe, entitled "Character", was prefixed to Wagstaffe's Miscellaneous Works published in 1725. In it, the author of the sketch on Wagstaffe (presumably Levett) is referred to as "an eminent Physician, no less valued for his skill in his profession, which he showed in several useful treatises, than admired for his Wit and Facetiousness in Conversation".

Levett and Freind were both friends and correspondents of the English antiquarian Thomas Hearne, who frequently corresponded with the two physicians about his health and other topics.

Levett rebuilt at his own expense the school physician's home, the home extending beside and beyond the great gate in Charterhouse Square. Levett resided in the home until his death, and decorated it with oak panelling and elaborate carving. Levett played a major role in shaping the early history of the Charterhouse. He also served as treasurer to the Royal College of Physicians. In that capacity he purchased 10 candlesticks and a pair of snuffers and stands from the goldsmith Matthew Cooper that are still in the collection of the college.

== Death and commemoration ==
Henry Levett died on 2 July 1725, aged 56. His widow remarried the school's headmaster Andrew Tooke.

He was buried at the foot of the altar in the chapel at Charterhouse, where he is commemorated by a classical monument. It bears an inscription in Latin and Levett's coat of arms.
