= William Levett (courtier) =

William Levett, Esq.
- Born: William Levett; Melton Mowbray, Leicestershire, England
- Occupations: courtier; land agent; magistrate
- Employer(s): King Charles I of England, King Charles II of England
- Known for: courtier who accompanied King Charles I on his flight from Cromwell forces to imprisonment on Isle of Wight and to the scaffold for his execution
- Title: Groom of the Bedchamber, Page of the Backstairs
- Children: Catherine Levett Dering; Dr. Henry Levett
- Parent: James Levett

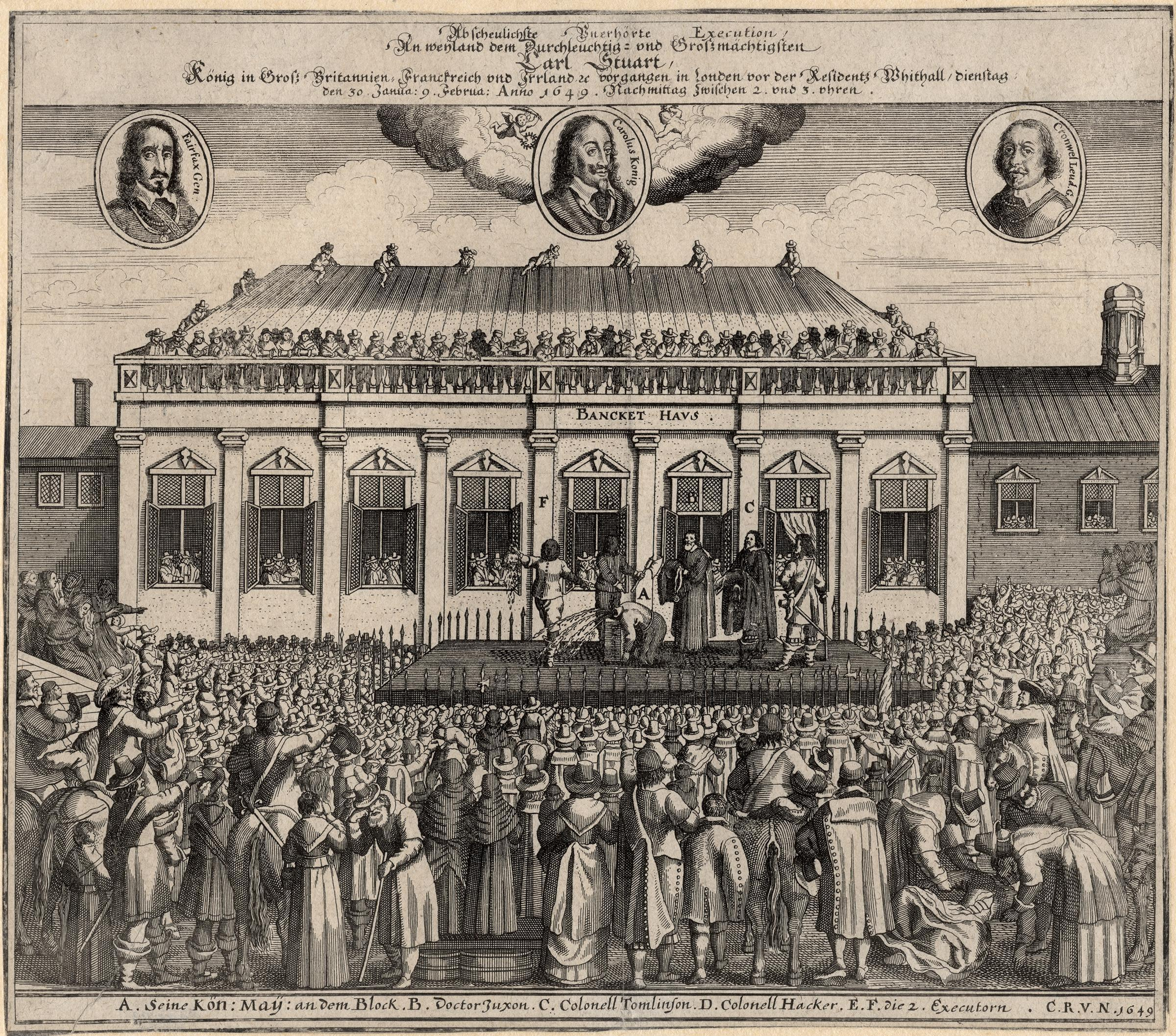
The execution of King Charles I of England, to which he was accompanied on the scaffold by courtier William Levett, Esq.

William Levett, Esq., (sometimes spelled William Levet) was a long serving courtier to King Charles I of England. Levett accompanied the King during his flight from Parliamentary forces, including his escape from Hampton Court palace, and eventually to his imprisonment in Carisbrooke Castle on the Isle of Wight, and finally to the scaffold on which he was executed. Following the King's death, Levett wrote a letter claiming that he had witnessed the King writing the so-called Eikon Basilike during his imprisonment, an allegation that produced a flurry of new claims about the disputed manuscript and flamed a growing movement to rehabilitate the image of the executed monarch.

== Life ==
The brother of Rev. Richard Levett of Ashwell, Rutland, William Levett was likely born in Melton Mowbray, Leicestershire, the son of James Levett, descendant of a knightly Sussex family of Anglo-Norman descent. Levett entered the Royal service as a Page of the Backstairs, eventually rising to Groom of the Bedchamber. As a courtier, Levett likely benefitted from favors dispensed by the monarchy.

Levett's appointment as courtier seems to date from the beginning of King Charles' reign. Levett was appointed a page in the king's bedchamber at Oxford on 16 January 1644 as a replacement for George Harley. By the time the King had been captured and sent to Carisbrooke Castle on the Isle of Wight, it was clear that Levett had made himself indispensable: the King requested that Levett be one of the few courtiers allowed to accompany him there. During the King's escape from Hampton Court, Levett had apparently proven his mettle, accompanying the King in his flight southward away from Parliamentary forces.

Towards the end of his life, writing from his home in Wiltshire, where he owned Levett's Farm within Savernake Forest, had long leased the Goddard mansion in Swindon, and owned property at Manton as well, Levett sent a letter claiming that he had seen King Charles writing the Eikon Basilike. The letter, signed by Levet on 29 April 1691, and incorporated into later editions of the work alleged to have been authored by the monarch, was celebrated by those who wished to see the dead King as saint for having given his life for the cause of the nation.

"If anyone has a desire to know the true author of the book entitled Eikon Basilike," Levett wrote, "I, one of the servants of King Charles the First, in his bedchamber, do declare, when his said Majesty was prisoner in the Isle of Wight, that I read over the above mentioned book, (which was long before the said book was printed) in his bed-chamber, writ with his Majesty's own hand, with several underlinings."

"I can testify also," Levett continued in his letter, "that Royston the printer told me, that he was imprisoned by Oliver Cromwell, the Protector, because he would not declare that King Charles the First, was not the author of the said Book." Besides Levett, Royston the printer figured prominently in the attempts to prove that the King himself had authored the Eikon Basilike.

In his letter, which he gave to his son Dr. Henry Levett of the Charterhouse London, Levett made clear that he was much in favor with Charles, which contemporary observers noted. In a later letter to Lincoln's Inn barrister Seymour Bourman, Levett noted that he was nearly always in the King's presence. "I waited on his Majesty, as page of the bedchamber in ordinary, during all the time of his solitudes, (except when I was forced from him). And specially being nominated by his Majesty to be one of his servants, among others, that should attend him during the treaty at Newport, in the isle of Wight."

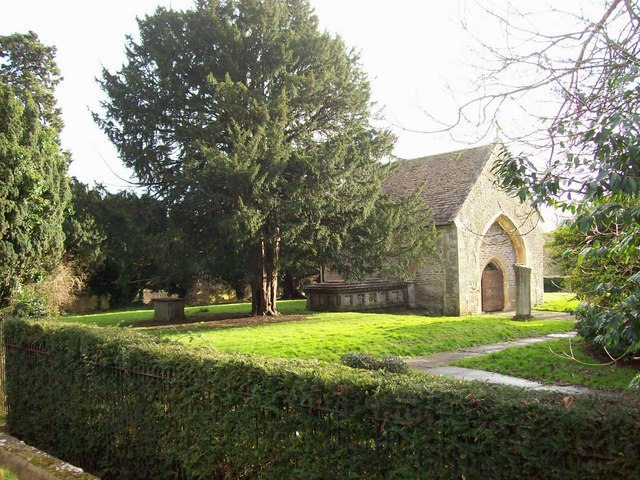
Holy Rood Church, Swindon, Wiltshire, burial place of two children of William Levett, courtier, of Swindon and Savernake Forest

John Ashburnham, another of the King's courtiers also from an old Sussex gentry family, noted in a memoir published later by a descendant that Levett was much in favor with the King and was often to be seen in his presence. "I believe Mr. Firebrace, Mr. Dowset and Mr. Levet know most of them," Ashburnham recalled in his memoir about those who assisted courtier Levet at the time of Charles' death. "The names of these three gentlemen," notes the manuscript, "frequently occur in the histories and memoirs of that time as employed near the king's person, and much in his majesty's confidence."

Following the execution of the King, Oliver Cromwell permitted the King's head to be sewn back onto his body for burial. Charles was buried in private on the night of 7 February 1649, inside the Henry VIII vault in St George's Chapel at Windsor Castle. William Levett Esq. and four other royal retainers—Sir Thomas Herbert, Capt. Anthony Mildmay, Sir Henry Firebrace and Abraham Dowcett (sometimes spelled Dowsett) -- conveyed the King's body to Windsor. The King's son, King Charles II, later planned an elaborate royal mausoleum, but it was never built.

Following the rule of Cromwell and Parliament, Levett, now acting as an officer in the militia, aided the Royal forces when they retook Marlborough, a former hotbed of Roundhead sentiment. In a letter to Col. Charles Seymour of 1663, Levett wrote of riding into Marlborough, where he and a party of Royalist sympathizers "assaulted the burial place of the Quakers at Wanton and laid it waste, leaving all the prey to the owners' disposal."

William Levett lived out the rest of his life following his service to King Charles at his homes in Wiltshire, where he had secured a sinecure as an agent and surveyor for Francis Seymour, 5th Duke of Somerset. Levett had leased the Swindon manor house of the Goddard family property at Swindon beginning in 1658. On 22 January 1658, Francis Bowman Gent., "guardian of Thomas Goddard, leased to Levett a "mansion house lately occupied by Anne Goddard in Swindon." Later Goddard family leases to Levett, who retained his farm within Savernake Forest, would come to include other lands owned by the Goddard family in Swindon. In the lease of April 5, 1664, the lease by Goddard notes that "the Parke etc." is included as well as the Goddard mansion. Levett subsequently buried two of his children at Holy Rood Church, the church on the Goddard estate in Swindon.

Levett frequented acted in legal matters on behalf of the county, and subsequently served King Charles II of England as Page of the Backstairs, beginning at the Restoration in 1660. How long he served the Royal Household is his second incarnation as a courtier is unclear, and he spent the rest of his life trying to recover a pension for his time as a courtier. The former courtier did receive monies from the Crown from time to time, including two such payments in 1680, one advanced out of the "remains of the Queen's Portugal portion."

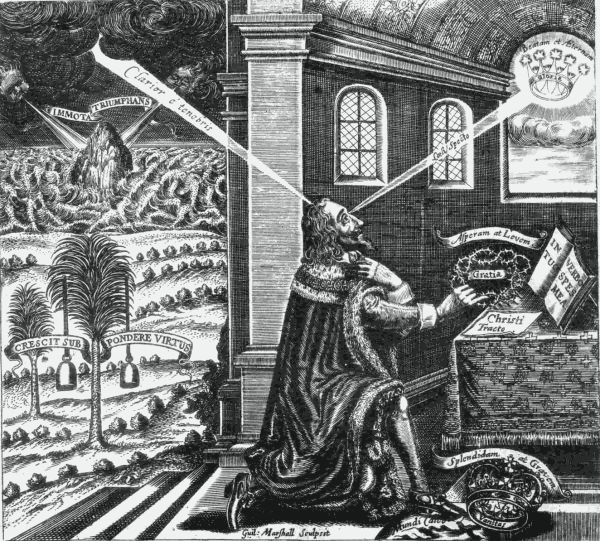
Famous frontispiece of the Eikon Basilike, The Pourtrature of His Sacred Majestie in His Solitudes and Sufferings. Later editions carried sworn statement by courtier Levett

Two of his infant children born during his Wiltshire residence are buried within Holyrood Church in Swindon. Levett's daughter Catherine married Rev. Edward Dering. She died in 1701 and is buried with other members of the Dering family within the church of Charing, Kent. There is a monument to Catherine Levett Dering on the floor of the church chancel. They had no children.

"Here lieth the Body of Catherine DERING," reads the monument to the daughter of William Levett, "wife of the Reverend Edward Dering, clerk. She was daughter of William LEVET Esquire who served King Charles the First many years and attended him on ye scaffold at the time of his martyrdom. She departed this life December 4th 1701 and left noe issue."

Levett's sworn statement about the King, once in the hands of his son Dr. Henry Levett, later disappeared. There are indications that Henry Levett, a fellow of Exeter College, Oxford, may given the original to the well-known Oxford antiquarian Anthony Wood. The mementos presented to Levett from King Charles following his death on the scaffold are still owned by the descendants of William Levett's brother, vicar Richard Levett of Rutland, who live at Milford Hall in Staffordshire. It is also likely that two portraits by artist Sir Anthony van Dyck of King Charles I and his Queen, later in the possession of Sir Richard Levett, Lord Mayor of London, were initially owned by courtier William Levet and found their way to his nephew the Lord Mayor.
