= Okus Quarry =

Geological Site of Special Scientific Interest in Wiltshire, England

Coordinates: 51.55110°N 1.78939°W

Okus Quarry (grid reference SU147836) is a 2,500 square metre geological Site of Special Scientific Interest in Old Town, Swindon, Wiltshire, notified in 1951.

The site was formerly notified under the name "Okus Quarries".

== Sources ==
- Natural England citation sheet for the site (accessed 7 April 2022)
