= Apsley House, Swindon =

Building in Swindon, Wiltshire, England

Coordinates: 51°33′10″N 1°46′40″W

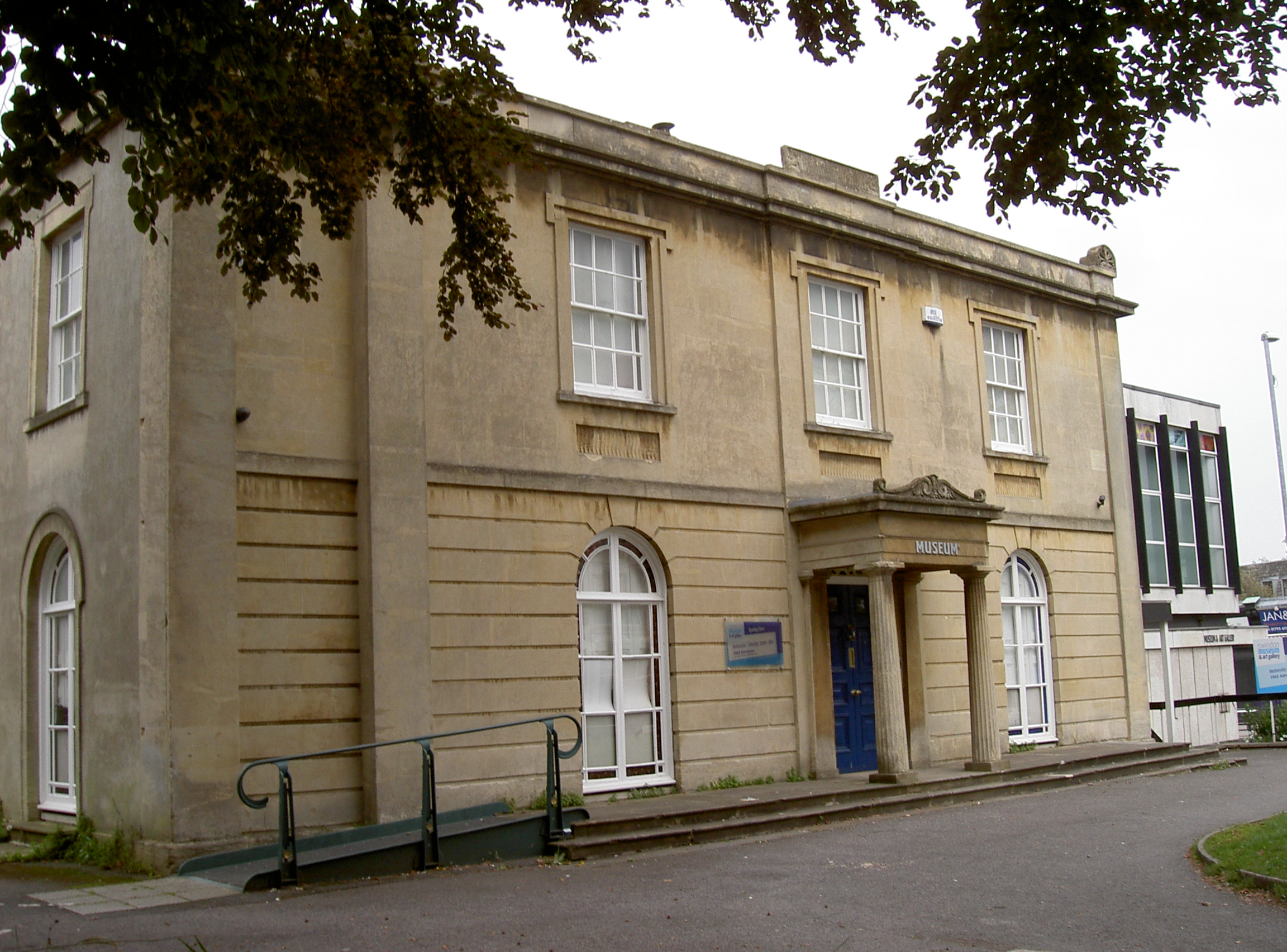
Apsley House

Apsley House is a 19th-century house in Swindon, England, standing on the north side of Bath Road in what is now known as the Old Town.

It was built c.1830–1840 and faced in ashlar Bath stone, and has a shallow porch over the central entrance, in the style of a Doric portico. The house has two storeys at the front and three at the rear; a modernist extension was added to the right in 1963–1964, extending along Victoria Road above a row of shops.

The house was for a long time the home and business headquarters of the Toomer family, who ran a local coke and coal business. From 1930 until 2021 it housed the Swindon Museum and Art Gallery but the museum vacated the building and the house was put up for sale when its owners, Swindon Borough Council, decided it was no longer suitable and required major repairs.

Apsley House was designated as Grade II listed in 1951. Julian Orbach, updating Nikolaus Pevsner's Wiltshire volume in 2021, calls it a "good ashlar villa".
