= Swindon Town Hall =

Municipal building in Swindon, Wiltshire, England

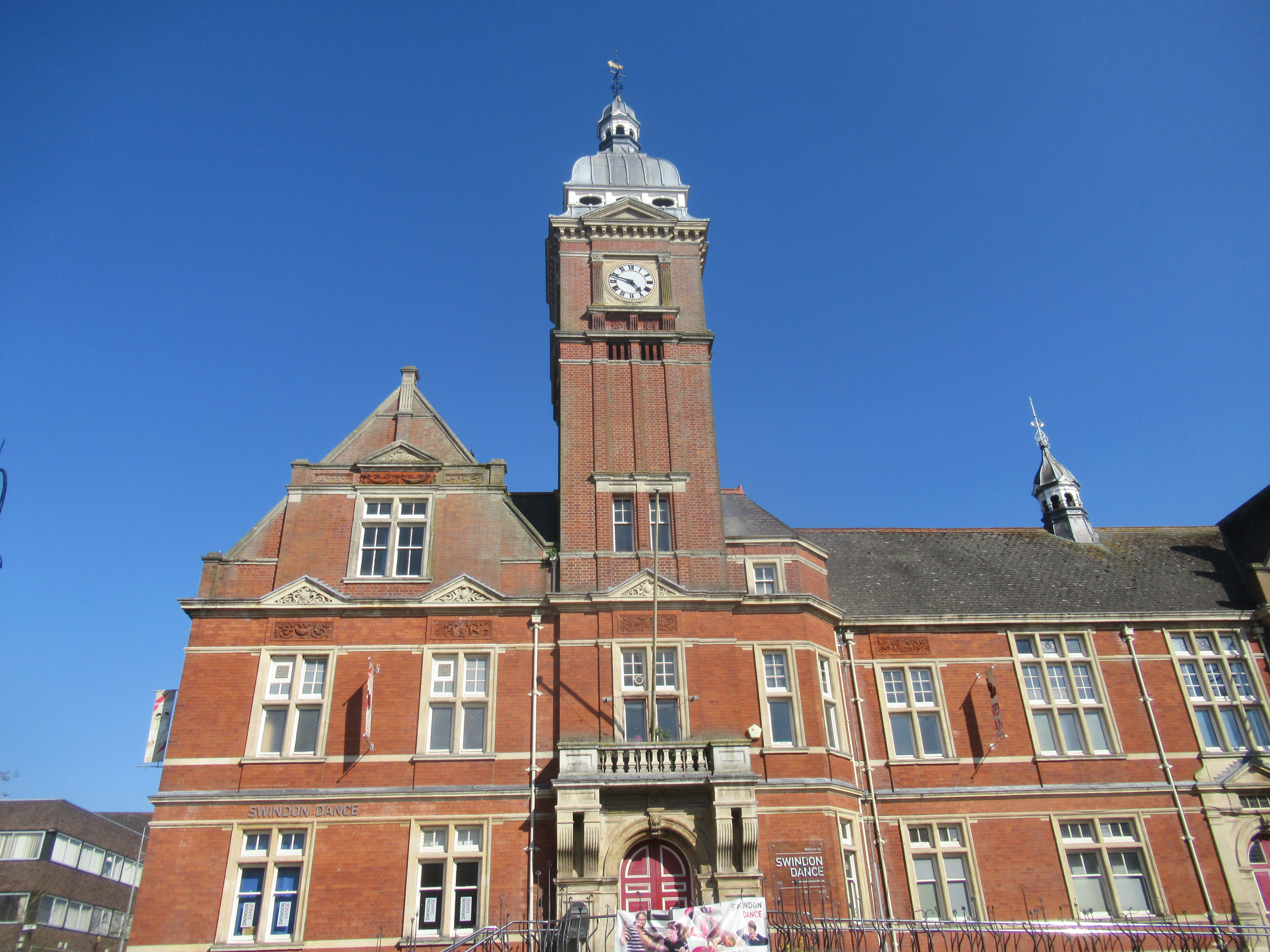
- Swindon Town Hall

- Shown in Wiltshire
- 51.5585°N 1.7815°W
- Location: Swindon, Wiltshire, England

History
- Built: 1891

Site notes
- Architect: Brightwen Binyon
- Architectural style: Victorian style

Listed Building – Grade II
- Designated: 23 April 1986
- Reference no.: 1355877

Swindon Town Hall is a former municipal building in Swindon, England which was built in 1891 to be a centrepiece of New Swindon. It is currently used by Swindon Dance, a national dance agency. It is a Grade II listed building.

== History ==
The building was commissioned to replace the old town hall in the High Street in the Old Town area of Swindon. By 1890, the New Swindon Local Board had plans to build their new public offices in what is now Regent Circus. This location, halfway between the new Railway Village and the Old Town, was thought by some to be "both psychologically and strategically an excellent position for the new town to establish a landmark building". The site was acquired from Colonel William Vilett Rolleston, owner of the Old Manor House in the Market Square.

Following a design competition for which there were 20 entries, the building was designed by Brightwen Binyon of Ipswich in a Victorian style. The design included a main entrance with a round-headed archway flanked by paired fluted brackets with a balustrade and a 90 ft high clock tower above, containing a clock by Thwaites & Reed. The building was officially opened by the Marquess of Bath on 21 October 1891.

In the later 19th century the prospect of combining the New Town and the Old Town into a single Swindon had become a burning issue. Commentators of the time such as the Swindon Advertiser's editor William Morris were heavily in favour. The New Swindon Urban District Council was the more powerful of the two at this time, containing within it all of Swindon's industrial companies and the majority of the population. The two towns remained separate until 1901 when they combined and Swindon Borough Council became the last to be incorporated during Queen Victoria's reign.

The town hall in Regent Circus became the council offices of the new borough and remained so until the Civic Offices were opened in Euclid Street in July 1938.

The building was also the venue for magistrates' court hearings. This lack of dedicated judicial facilities was temporarily resolved when the new Courts of Justice (now referred to as Swindon Magistrates' Court) were opened in Princes Street on 21 April 1965.

The ground floor of the town hall housed the Swindon Reference Library until 2006 when it moved into temporary accommodation pending new purpose-built premises in Regent Circus becoming available in October 2008. The remainder of the building has been used as dance studios and a media hub.
