= Swindon Festival of Literature =

Swindon Festival of Literature is an annual literature festival held in Swindon, Wiltshire, England, which was founded in 1994 by Matt Holland of Lower Shaw Farm. It takes place in early May.

== History ==
The festival was founded in 1994 by Matt Holland, who still organises the festival. Holland works at Lower Shaw Farm, an arts centre in Swindon. The festival was initially supported by the Chamber of Commerce and a donation from Dominic Winter, a local book auctioneer. In 2025 it is sponsored by Swindon Borough Council, Swindon Artswords, and Lower Shaw Farm. The festival, which takes place in early May, typically begins with a 'Dawn Chorus' event at 5.30am on the first day.

== Events ==
The festival typically includes creative writing workshops, poetry in the park, flash fiction slams, storytelling walks, and film nights. Speakers at the first event included former Labour leader Michael Foot, and historian and civil servant Clive Ponting. Other well-known writers or speakers who have appeared at the festival include Tony Benn, Melvyn Bragg, Clare Balding, Esther Rantzen, Harriet Harman, Pam Ayres, Michael Rosen, Jasper Fforde, and Kate Adie.

The thirtieth anniversary festival in 2023 featured Claire Fox, John Higgs, Nigel Biggar and Julie Cohen.

The 2024 event was initially cancelled after Matt Holland decided to step down, but he had a change of heart and remained in the role. The 2025 festival includes Professor Muir Gray, Richard Dawkins, local author John Cullimore, Philip Garrahan talking about Swindon local history, and Mike Pringle discussing nature writer Richard Jefferies.
