= Brightwen =

Brightwen is both a surname and a given name. Notable people with the name include:

- Brightwen Binyon (1846–1905), British architect
- Eliza Brightwen (1830–1906), Scottish naturalist and author
