= Op. 32 =

In music, Op. 32 stands for Opus number 32. Compositions that are assigned this number include:

- Arensky – Piano Trio No. 1
- Barber – Vanessa
- Beach – Gaelic Symphony
- Britten – Festival Te Deum
- Chopin – Nocturnes, Op. 32
- Dvořák – Moravian Duets
- Elgar – Imperial March
- Holst – The Planets
- Klebe – Die Ermordung Cäsars
- Mendelssohn – Die schöne Melusine
- Nielsen – Chaconne
- Rachmaninoff – Preludes, Op. 32
- Saint-Saëns – Cello Sonata No. 1
- Schubert – Die Forelle
- Schumann – 4 Klavierstücke (Scherzo, Gigue, Romance and Fughette)
- Sibelius – The Origin of Fire (Tulen synty), cantata for baritone, male choir, and orchestra (1902, revised 1910)
- Sinding – Frühlingsrauschen
- Sinigaglia – Le baruffe chiozzotte
- Tchaikovsky – Francesca da Rimini
