= Swindon Works =

Former railway workshops in Swindon, Wiltshire, England

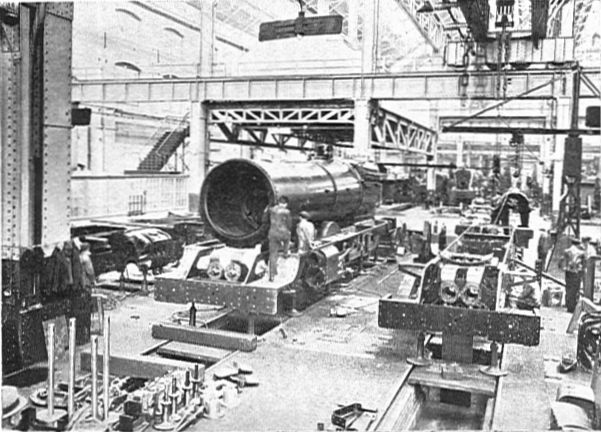
- King class locomotives under construction, 1928

- Location within Wiltshire

General information
- Status: Redeveloped
- Location: Swindon, Wiltshire, England
- Coordinates: 51.562°N 1.795°W
- Construction started: 1841
- Completed: 1843
- Demolished: 1986
- Client: Great Western Railway

Design and construction
- Other designers: Daniel Gooch; Isambard Kingdom Brunel

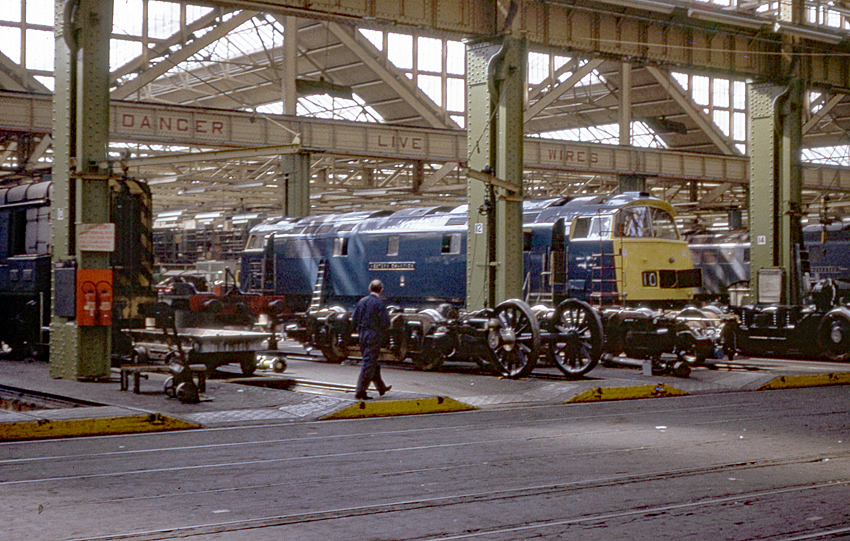
D1015 Western Champion in A Shop

Swindon Works was opened by the Great Western Railway in 1843 in Swindon, Wiltshire, England. It served as the principal west England maintenance centre until closed in 1986.

== History ==
In 1835, Parliament approved the construction of the Great Western Main Line between London and Bristol by the Great Western Railway (GWR). Its Chief Engineer was Isambard Kingdom Brunel.

From 1836, Brunel had been buying locomotives from various makers for the new railway. Brunel's general specifications gave the locomotive makers a free hand in design, although subject to certain constraints such as piston speed and axle load, resulting in a diverse range of locomotives of mixed quality. In 1837, Brunel recruited Daniel Gooch and gave him the job of rectifying the heavy repair burden of the GWR's mixed bag of purchased locomotives.

It became clear that the GWR needed a central repair works, so in 1840 Gooch identified a site at Swindon because it was at the junction with the Golden Valley line and also a "convenient division of the Great Western line for engine working". With Brunel's support, Gooch made his proposal to the GWR directors, who, on 25 February 1841, authorised the establishment of the works at Swindon. Construction started immediately and they became operational on 2 January 1843.

=== Location ===
There are several stories relating to how the railway came to pass through Swindon. A well-circulated myth states that Brunel and Gooch were surveying a vale north of Swindon Hill and Brunel either threw a stone or dropped a sandwich and declared that spot to be the centre of the works. However, Swindon's midway point between GWR terminals and the topography of land near the town were more likely factors.

The GWR mainline was originally planned to cut through Savernake Forest near Marlborough, but the Marquess of Ailesbury, who owned the land, objected. The Marquess had previously objected to part of the Kennet and Avon Canal running through his estate (see Bruce Tunnel). With the railway needing to run near to a canal at this point, and as it was cheaper to transport coal for trains along canals at this time, Swindon was the next logical choice for the works, 20 miles (32 km) north of the original route and on the Wilts & Berks Canal.

The line was laid in 1840, but the location of the works was still undecided. Tracks were laid at Didcot in 1839 (chosen as Lord Wantage did not want the railway passing close to Abingdon) and for some time this seemed a more likely site.

Gooch noted that the nearby Wilts & Berks Canal gave Swindon a direct connection with the Somerset Coalfield. He also realised that engines needed to be changed at Swindon or close by, as the gradients from Swindon to Bristol were much more arduous than the relatively easy route between London and Swindon. Drawing water for the engines from the canals was also considered, and an agreement to this effect was completed in 1843. Gooch recorded at the time:

I was called to report upon the best situation to build these works and, on full consideration, I reported in favour of Swindon, it being the junction with the Cheltenham branch and also a convenient division of the Great Western Line for the engine working. Mr. Brunel and I went to look at the ground, then only green fields, and he agreed with me as to its being the best place.

Once the plan was set for the railway to come to Swindon, it was at first intended to bring it closely along the foot of Swindon Hill, so as to be as close as possible to the town without entailing the excessive engineering works of building on the hill. However, the Goddard family (lords of the manor of Swindon) objected to having it near their property, so it was laid a couple of miles further north.

=== Early years ===
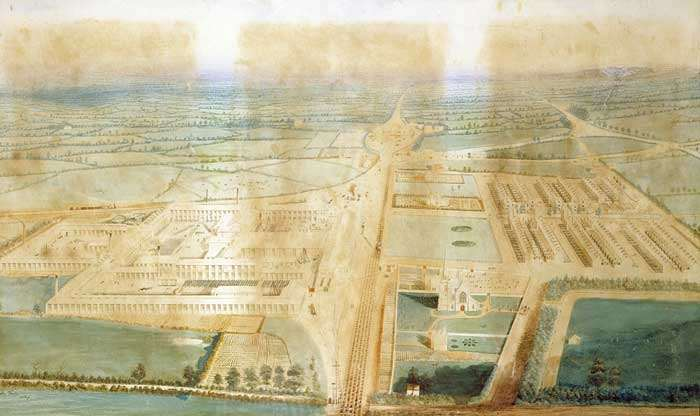
Watercolour of New Swindon in 1849, by Edward Snell

With many of the early structures built and adorned by stone extracted from the construction of Box Tunnel, the first building – the locomotive repair shed – was completed in 1841 using contract labour, with the necessary machinery installed within it by 1842. Initially only employing 200 men, repairs began in 1843, with the first new locomotive, the "Premier", built in 1846 in under two weeks and renamed "Great Western". This was followed by six more, with the Iron Dukes, including The Lord of the Isles, considered the fastest broad-gauge engine of its day. By 1851, the works were employing over 2,000 men and were producing about one locomotive a week, with the first standard-gauge engine built in 1855. A rolling mill for manufacturing rails was installed in 1861, attracting workers from South Wales. Although some rolling stock was built at Wolverhampton (producing 800 standard-gauge locomotives up to 1908), Worcester and Saltney near Chester, most of the work was concentrated at Swindon.

Like most early railways, the GWR was built with gentle gradients and the minimum of curves, which meant that it was able to operate fast, lightweight 'single-wheelers', 2-2-2 and 4-2-2. However, from 1849 Gooch also built 4-4-0 saddle tanks for the hillier routes in Devon.

=== Swindon Railway Village ===
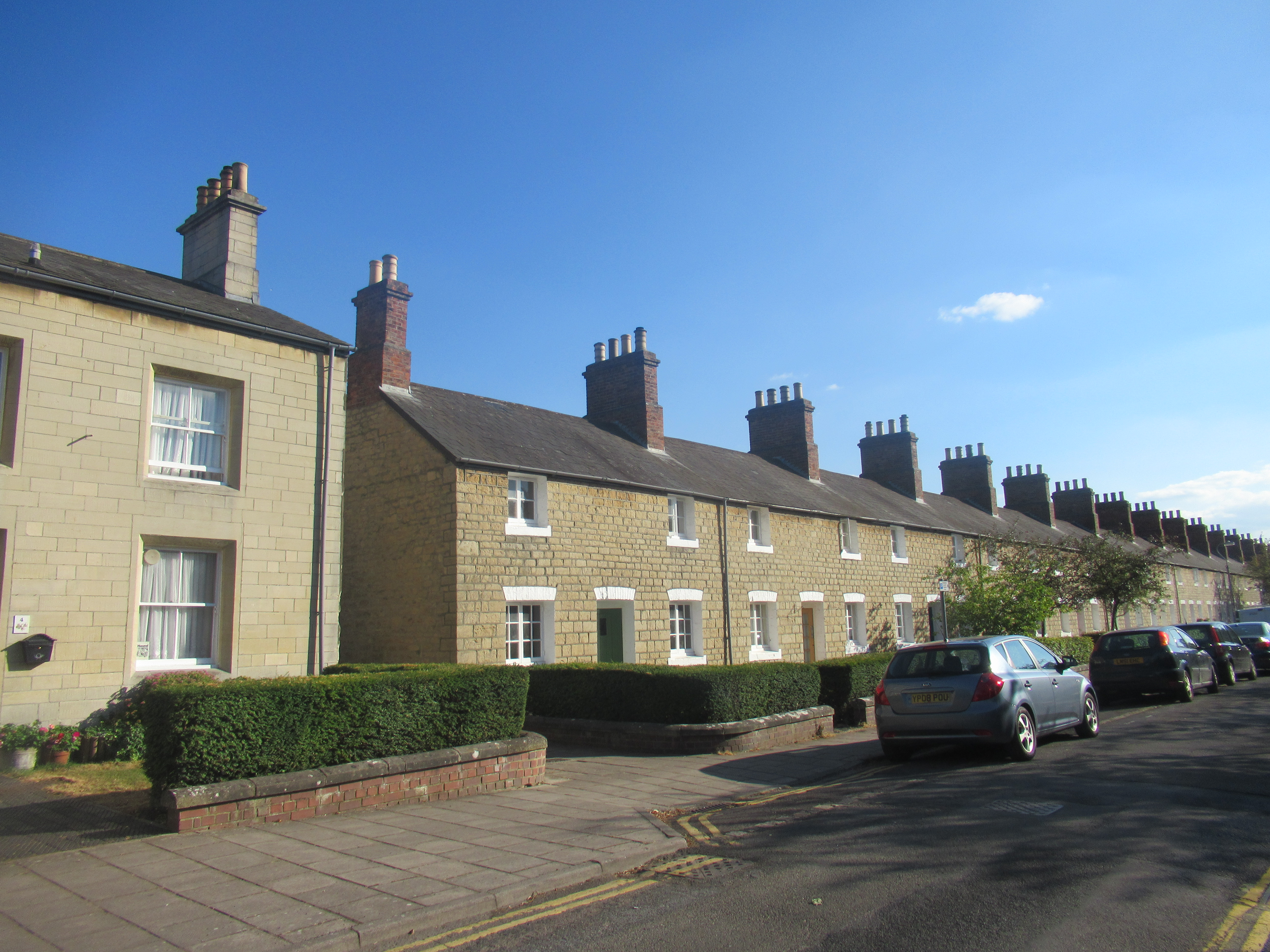
Preserved housing, originally built for the railway workers

Swindon Railway Village 'Backsie'

The Works transformed Swindon from a small 2,500-population market town into a bustling railway town. Built to the north of the town centre, the works had need for locally accessible housing and services for the workers. The development of the railway village was on the lines of similar Victorian era socially-encompassing lifestyle concepts, such as that at Bournville but architect/builder Rigby's signed an agreement in February 1841 to build 300 cottages at their own expense. The completed village provided to the town medical and educational facilities that had been sorely lacking, The large St Mark's Church was built in 1843-45. The Bakers Arms public house was built as a shop with accommodation above in 1846. The Cricketers' public house was built in 1846.

Construction of the Railway Village began in 1841. In 1891 it had around 287 houses, a large mechanics' institute, a market with capacity for 32 shops and standings for thirty stalls, a cottage hospital, a park, an Anglican church, a Methodist chapel, swimming baths and a medical dispensary. The financial difficulties of the contractors J. D. & C. Rigby, who undertook to build 300 cottages but only completed 130, delayed the completion of the village until the 1850s. The cottages to the west of Emlyn Square were built first (1842–43), followed by those on the east side (1845–1847). The end blocks towards Emlyn Square, having corner shops on the ground floor, were built in 1845–1847, and the remainder, mostly end blocks on the outer ends of the streets, in 1853–1855. In 1966, the local authority acquired the cottages from British Rail and restored them. The village is one of Britain’s best-preserved and architecturally most ambitious railway settlements.

The terraced two-storey cottages were built on two blocks of four parallel streets, not dissimilar in appearance to passing trains. Each road was named after the destinations of trains that passed nearby: Bristol, Bath, Taunton, London, Oxford and Reading among them. Built in the nearby open area, named Emlyn Square after GWR director Viscount Emlyn (later known as John Campbell, 1st Earl Cawdor), was the Mechanics Institute (MI). Designed and constructed by Edward Roberts, the MI was completed in 1855. It contained one the UK's earliest public lending libraries and provided health services to workers. The GWR Medical Fund Baths and Dispensary (which housed Victorian Turkish baths from 1906) were built in 1891–92, becoming the NHS Health Centre and Milton Road Baths in 1947 and the Health Hydro in 1986. The Mechanics' Institute (founded in 1843) moved into a purpose-built building in 1854. The Mechanics' Institute building was closed in February 1986 and remains unoccupied. The Barracks were built in 1853–55 as a lodging house but became a Wesleyan chapel in 1867, the GWR Museum in 1962 and then The Platform (Swindon Music Service) in 2000. The Armoury, built in 1862, became the GWR Hospital in 1871, a Workers' Club in 1960 and the Central Community Centre in 1979. The GWR Park, adjacent to St Mark's Church, was acquired in 1844. The Octagonal Market started in 1892 and was demolished in 1977. A house and shop built in the 1840s became a public house in the 1850s and is now the Glue Pot public house.

In 1846-1847 a terrace of 16 cottages was built on the north side of Faringdon Road (Nos 4-34). One of the last houses to be built, 34 Faringdon Road, originally 1 Faringdon Street is now the 'Railway Village Museum' and is maintained as a typical railwayman's house of about 1900. It retains original features such as glazing, window sashes, margin lights and plank door.

Park House

1876 saw the GWR directors agree to build a house and surgery combined. The house, Park House, was for the company’s chief medical officer and his family and was built in 1876-77. Built in yellow brick with stone dressings and a slate roof. Three stories and basement. Park House today provides serviced offices.

In the 1960s, the Borough of Swindon municipal council applied to demolish much of the village, but poet and railway enthusiast John Betjeman led a successful campaign to preserve it. Today the Railway Village is part of the Swindon Railway Conservation Area, and many structures within it are listed buildings.

=== Expansion ===
Gooch followed a policy of taking in-house any railway engineering discipline that could be enabled to scale. Hence in addition to locomotive building, from 1850 standardised goods wagons were produced, and in 1867 Swindon was made the central workshop for the construction of carriages and wagons.

In 1864, when Joseph Armstrong took over, he took on the responsibility of improving the passenger stock, resulting in 1878 of a separate carriage and wagon works being built on land north of the station. The first Royal Saloon was built in 1874 and converted to standard gauge in 1899. 1875 saw the opening of the boiler and tender making shops, eventually used to also produce parts for locomotives, and marine engines for the GWR's fleet of ships and barges. The first GWR through corridor train was built in 1891, with electric lighting introduced in 1900.

In 1892, the GWR completed the process of converting their lines to standard gauge. 13 miles (21 km) of new broad gauge sidings were laid to accommodate the influx of rolling stock, so that by 21/22 May 1892 195 locomotives, 748 carriages and 3,400 wagons and vans were stored for conversion to the new gauge. Those that could not be converted were scrapped on site. By the turn of the century, the works were employing an estimated three-quarters of Swindon's entire workforce.

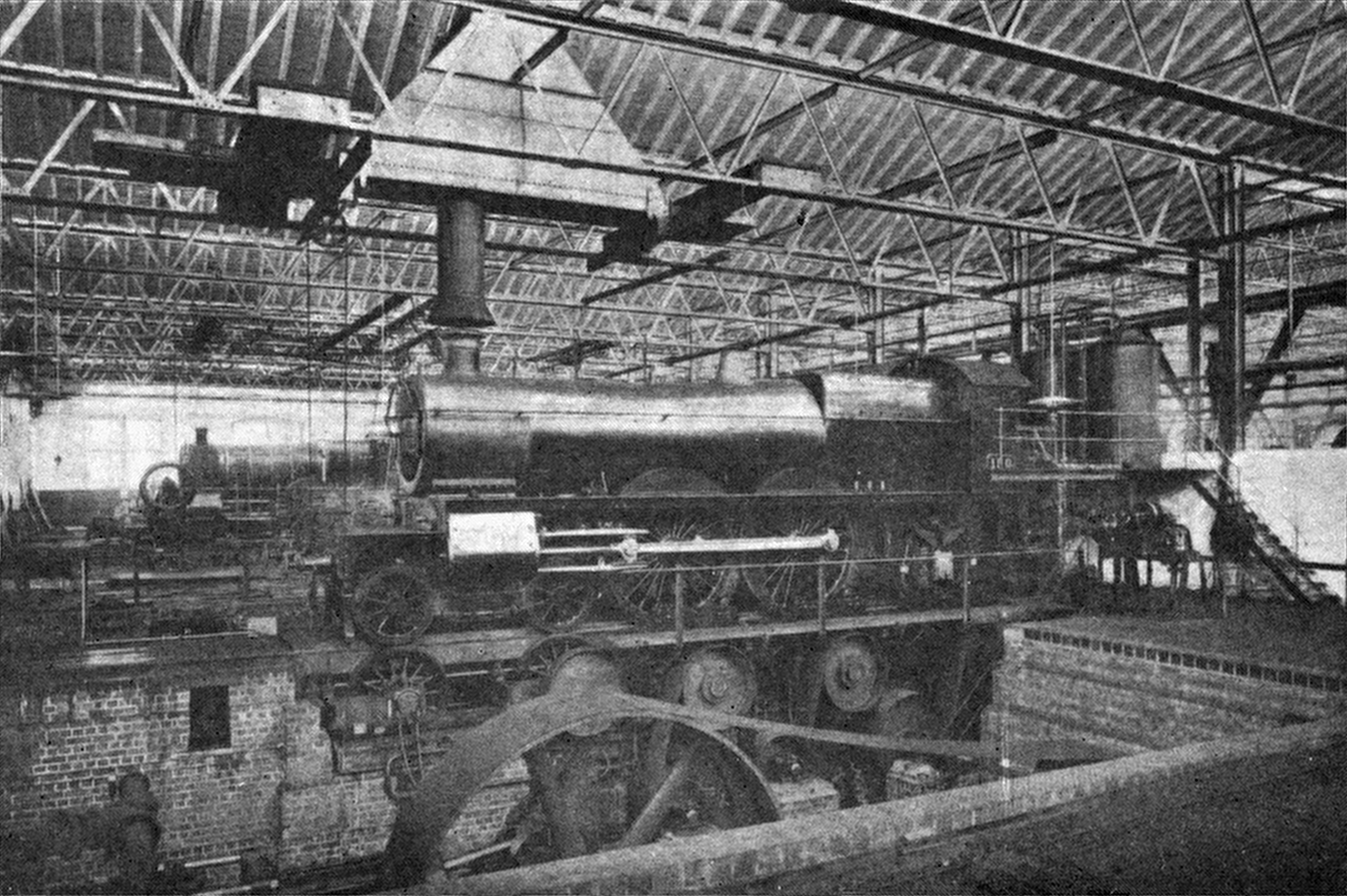
An early GWR Saint class, in the period when these were taper-boilered 4-4-2 Atlantics (1905–12), in the testing shop

George Churchward's tenure, first as Assistant Chief Superintendent in 1897, then Locomotive Superintendent in 1902, produced heavier locomotives, firstly the 4-4-0 City class, then the County class. Later in 1906, "North Star", originally 4-4-2, was rebuilt as the first four-cylinder 4-6-0. More four-cylindered 4-6-0 engines were built, and in 1908 the first 4-6-2 "Pacific" entered service, the only tender engine of that type in Britain until 1922. It was later rebuilt as a 4-6-0. From 1914 the works turned to aiding the war effort, producing twelve howitzers by the end of the year.

=== Heyday ===
Charles Collett, Chief Mechanical Engineer from 1921 to 1941, greatly improved the works' boiler making and its facilities for working heavy gauge sheet metal. In 1927 the GWR's most powerful and largest locomotive, the King class, was introduced to become the "flagship" of the GWR fleet. The Kings had been developed from the Castle Class which, along with the Halls, were the foundation of the GWR's reputation and image.

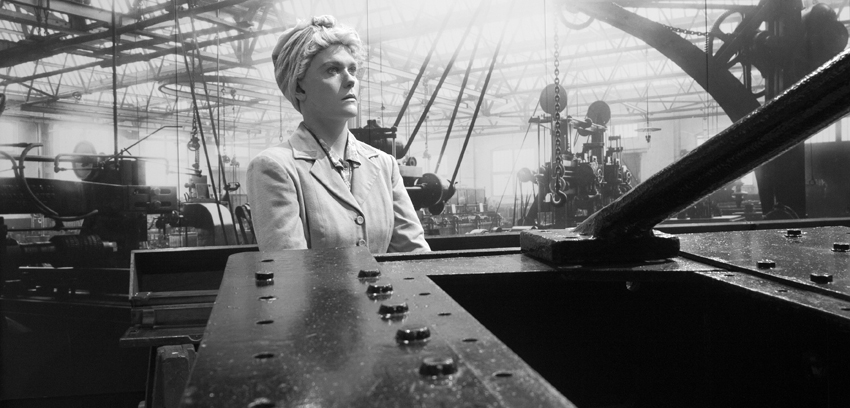
Evocation of wartime in Swindon Works

This was the heyday of Swindon Works, when 14,000 people were employed and the main locomotive fabrication workshop, the A Shop was, at 11.25 acres (45,500 m^{2}), one of the largest covered areas in the world.

During World War II, Swindon was again involved with military hardware, producing various types of gun mountings. Locomotive wheel-turning lathes were also ideally suited for making turret rings for tanks. The works also built landing craft and parts for midget submarines.

=== Nationalisation ===
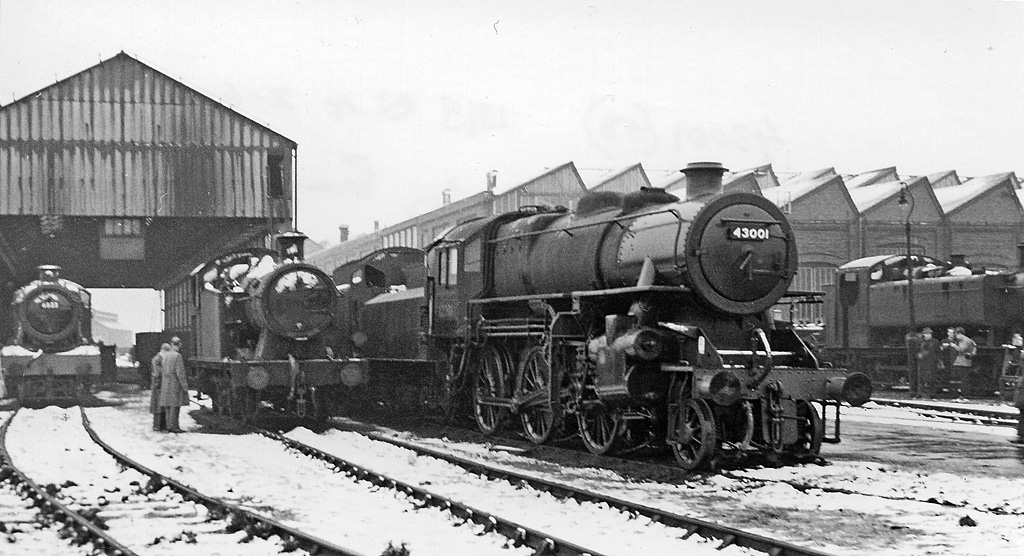
Locomotives outside Swindon Works in the snow in November 1964

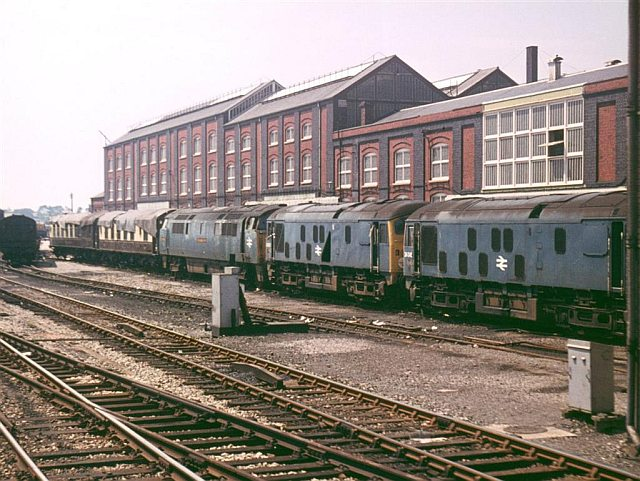
Locomotives awaiting scrapping outside the Works

At the nationalisation of British Railways (BR) in 1948, the works were still producing 60 new locomotives in the year, falling to 42 in 1954. From 1948 to 1956, the works made 452 steam engines to GWR designs, partly in parallel with producing 200 BR standard classes from 1951 until 1960.

The decision in 1960 to move BR's main motive power from steam to diesel brought the works both new lines of employment and an end to an old one. The works became the southern UK's regional hub for the storage and scrapping of steam locomotives and rolling stock, a role which later expanded to all scrap railwayana in light of the Beeching axe. However, it also brought about an end to steam locomotive production, with the works producing BR's last steam locomotive 92220 Evening Star, by which time the works only employed 5,000.

Much of the original design and specification for the first Mark 2 carriages and bogies was carried out by the Engineering drawing office at Swindon in the early 1960s. The B4 bogie used on this carriage provided more reliable high speed running than that under the previous generation Mark 1 carriage and heralded the higher running speeds brought in with the start of InterCity services and the West Coast Main Line electrification.

=== Decline and closure ===
The future of the works had been defined by the GWR's post-WW2 choice to develop its new diesel-powered experimental locomotives using diesel-hydraulic transmission systems rather than diesel-electric. As a result, from 1957 the works produced 38 "Warship" class D800s and 30 Western class D1000s. However, early diesel production followed previous steam locomotive construction strategy, resulting in numerous classes with short production runs and a resultant high maintenance cost in traffic. With the Beeching Axe strategy of reshaping BR towards inter-city traffic, the need for many of these diesel-powered classes was removed. A decision was also made to specify all new classes of locomotive with diesel-electric transmission, making the works' specialist diesel-hydraulic knowledge redundant.

As a result, with scrapping rolling stock keeping employment levels at the works high, a decision was made to cease building new locomotives at Swindon, and to reassign the works to become a heavy repair facility. Building of locomotives finished in 1965 with construction of the Class 14 diesel-hydraulic locomotives. Locomotive repairs and carriage and wagon work continued, though the original carriage and wagon workshop was sold.

After the works became part of BR's integrated British Rail Engineering Ltd (BREL), it won less and less maintenance business against the internal competition of Crewe and Derby Works. With the town of Swindon expanding and needing land close to its centre for development, the decision was made to close the works. The final day of operation was 26 March 1986.

Between 2000 and 2006, the rolling chassis of GWR No. 7200 was restored in the former iron foundry (J Shop), making it the final Great Western steam locomotive to receive attention at the works.

== Present ==
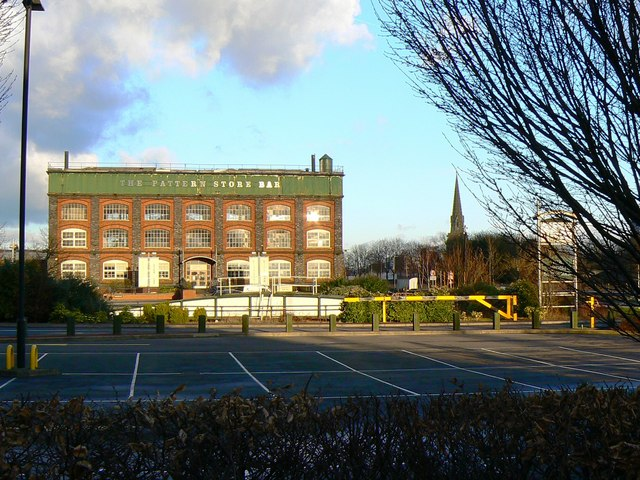
The former Pattern Store

The redevelopment of the works took account of the listed building status of the original core infrastructure. One building houses the Museum of the Great Western Railway, dedicated to the works and the GWR. The engineers' office is now the headquarters of English Heritage, with most of the remaining buildings redeveloped as part of the Designer Outlet Village. The rest of the site's extensive railway yard was redeveloped on a mixed-use basis, some for housing and some for commercial buildings including purpose-built storage for the English Heritage Archive and the National Trust's central office building, known as Heelis.

== Superintendents and chief engineers ==
- Sir Daniel Gooch, Locomotive, Carriage and Wagon Superintendent 1837–1864
- Joseph Armstrong, Locomotive, Carriage and Wagon Superintendent 1864–1877
- Major William Dean, Locomotive, Carriage and Wagon Superintendent 1877–1902
- G. J. Churchward, Locomotive, Carriage and Wagon Superintendent 1902–1916, and Chief Mechanical Engineer 1916–1921
- C. B. Collett, Chief Mechanical Engineer 1921–1941
- F. W. Hawksworth, Chief Mechanical Engineer 1941–1949

== Organisation ==
A great many different activities were carried out within the works and most of the components used to make locomotives, carriages and wagons were made on site. The works were organised into a number of shops:-

Shops in the Locomotive Works, in 1950
Shop	Description
A	Erectors, Boilermakers, Painters, Machine and Wheel Shop
B	Erectors, Boilermakers, Painters and Tender Shop
BSE	Engine Reception and Preparation
C	Concentration Yard (recovery of scrap metal)
D	Carpenters and Masons
E	Electrical Shop
F	Smiths, Springsmiths and Chainmakers
G	Millwrights
H	Pattern makers
J	Iron Foundry
J2	Chair Foundry
K	Coppersmiths and Sheet Metal Workers
L2	Tank Shop
M	Electric Sub-Station
N	Bolt Shop
O	Tool Room
P1	Steaming and Boiler Mounting
PL	Platelayers; Loco. Works, Rails, Roads and Water Mains Maintenance
Q	Angle Iron Smiths
R	Fitters, Turners and Machinemen
SP	Springsmiths
T	Brass finishers
TH	Testing House
U	Brass Foundry
V	Boilermakers
W	Turners and Machinemen
X	Points and Crossings, Fittings for Permanent Way
Z	Transport

Shops in the Carriage and Wagon Works, in 1950
Shop	Description
1	Sawmill (West End)
2	Sawmill
3	Fitting and Machines
4	Carriage Body Building
5	Electric Train Lighting
7	Carriage Finishing and Polishers
8	Carriage Painting
9	Carriage Trimming
9a	Lining Sewers (female)
10	Laundry (female)
11	General Labourers
12	Carpenters
13	Wagon Frame Building
13a	Carriage Frame Repairs
14	Smiths
15	Fitting, Machining, Plumbers, Gas and Steam Fitters, Sheet Metal Workers and Coppersmiths
16	Wheel
17	Road Vehicle Building and Repairing
18	Stamping
19a	Carriage Trimmers Repairs
19b	Carriage Finishers Repairs
19c	Carriage Lifters
19d	Vacuum Brake and Carriage Bogie Repairs
20	Horse Box and Carriage Truck Repairs
21	Wagon Building and Repairs
22	Oil and Grease Works
23	Platelayers' Yard, Maintenance and Breaking-up Yard
24	Carriage Repairs

== See also ==
- Locomotives of the Great Western Railway
- St Mark's Church, Swindon, built for the works' employees
