= Le baruffe chiozzotte =

Play by Carlo Goldoni

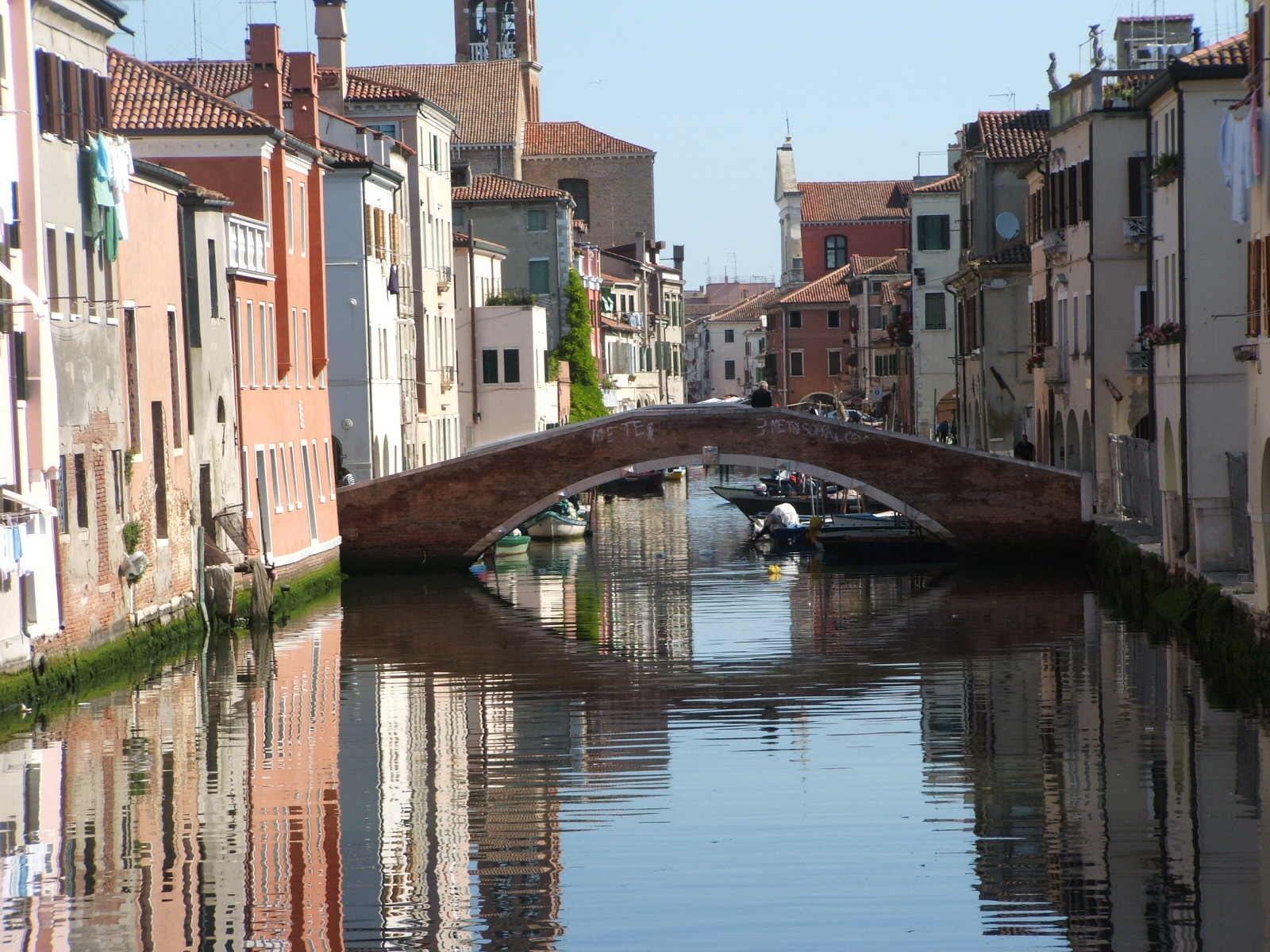
Chioggia lagoon, bridge over Canal Vena

Le baruffe chiozzotte (Italian pronunciation: [le baˈruffe kjodˈdzɔtte]), translated in English as Brawling in Chioggia, is a play by the Italian playwright Carlo Goldoni, first performed at the Teatro San Luca in Venice in January 1762. It deals with the comic struggles between two groups of fishermen in the lagoon-mouth village of Chioggia brought on by the love affairs of the younger generation. Written in Venetian, the comedy is intensified by the presence of a hapless young Venetian official, who is helpless to enforce order on the sly inhabitants he is supposed to keep under control.

In modern times, the play was revived at the Piccolo Teatro di Milano in 1962, in a production by Giorgio Strehler emphasizing the humanity and realism of Goldoni's script over the conventionally farcical elements. In 1966, the production was filmed for Italian television.

A concert overture based on the play was composed by Leone Sinigaglia in 1907; it was a favorite of Arturo Toscanini. An operatic version by Franco Leoni also exists.

== Roles ==
- Master Toni (Antonio), owner of a fishing boat
- Madam Pasqua, wife of Master Toni
- Lucietta, young girl, sister of Master Toni
- Titta-Nane (Giambattista), young fisherman
- Beppe (Giuseppe), younger brother of Master Toni
- Master Fortunato, fisherman
- Madam Libera, wife of Master Fortunato
- Orsetta (Orsolina), younger sister of Madam Libera
- Checca (Francesca), another younger sister of Madam Libera
- Master Vincenzo, fisherman
- Toffolo (Cristoforo), boat owner
- Isidoro, Adjunct of the Court Chancellor
- The Court Bailiff
- Canocchia, young man who sells pumpkin
- Fishermen on Master Toni's boat
- Servant of the Adjunct

== Plot ==
While Toni and his men are still fishing, the women (Pasqua, Lucietta; Libera, Orsetta, and Checca) are sitting outside their houses talking. Toffolo, another boat owner, comes by and flirts with Lucietta (who is actually engaged to Titta-Nane), giving her some roast pumpkin, thereby exciting the jealousy of Checca. The men (Toni, Beppe and Titta-Nane) all get involved after they arrive and a fight starts with Toffolo's group. This is broken up by Vicenzo and his soldiers. The different sets of jealous Chioggia lovers quarrel amongst themselves, and Toffolo complains to the officials. The Adjunct Isidoro is sent to try to sort everything out. Eventually there is a happy ending and peace is restored. Lucietta marries Titta-Nane, Orsetta marries Beppe and Checca is married to Toffolo.
