= Suffolk Archives =

Archive and county record office for Suffolk, England

Coordinates: 52.0541°N 1.1436°E

Suffolk Archives manage the historical archives for the county of Suffolk in the United Kingdom. These archives include a wide range of historical council and parish records, plus various commercial records, local historic book collections, local historic newspapers and various personal items. They are accessible to view at three locations: The Hold Ipswich; Lowestoft Library, Lowestoft and Bury St Edmunds. The Hold opened in September 2020 and also hosts various exhibitions, town walks and lectures. This service is run by Suffolk County Council.

== Development of the Suffolk Archives ==
The Suffolk Archives evolved from earlier archival arrangements of different bodies within the administrative area of the Suffolk County Council.

== Photographic Survey ==
The Suffolk Photographic Survey was an initiative made by Robert Pratt, of Capel St Mary in Suffolk, England in 1954. Its aim was to establish a collection of photographic images of sufficient variety to reflect the variety to be found in the history of Suffolk. Under the aegis of the Suffolk Local History Council the collection had grown significantly. In 1973 the collection was held at the Abbot's Hall Museum - subsequently the Museum of East End Life and now The Food Museum. In 1976 the collection was rehoused in the care of the Suffolk Record Office facilities then located in the former Bramford Road School.

== Suffolk Archives Ipswich Branch ==
Formerly the Ipswich and East Suffolk Record Office, the archives were held in the former Bramford Road School in Gateacre Road.

=== Relocation to The Hold ===
In 2014 Suffolk County Council and the University of Suffolk started working on plans for a collaborative project to create a new premises for a heritage centre close to the University of Suffolk campus on Ipswich Waterfront. By 2018 they had finalised their plans for The Hold, a new purpose built building that would also house a 200-seat auditorium, which would also be used by the university. The plans catered for expected growth of the archive for the next twenty years. the facility was opened in October 2020.

== Lowestoft Branch of Suffolk Archives ==
The Lowestoft Branch of Suffolk Archives is based in Lowestoft Central Library. Following the opening of The Hold, lorry loads of material was removed from the Lowestoft Record Office to be relocated in Ipswich. Local heritage campaigners set up "Save our Record Office", who campaigned unsuccessfully against the move, which occurred from 19 to 27 April 2021.

== Bury St Edmunds Branch ==
The Branch was originally established as the Bury St Edmunds Record Office in 1938. From 1950 to 1974 it was known as the Bury St Edmunds and West Suffolk Record Office, servings as a County Record Office for West Suffolk. However following the amalgamation of that county with East Suffolk, it became the Bury St Edmunds Branch of the Suffolk Record Office.
