= Health Hydro =

English health complex built in 1891

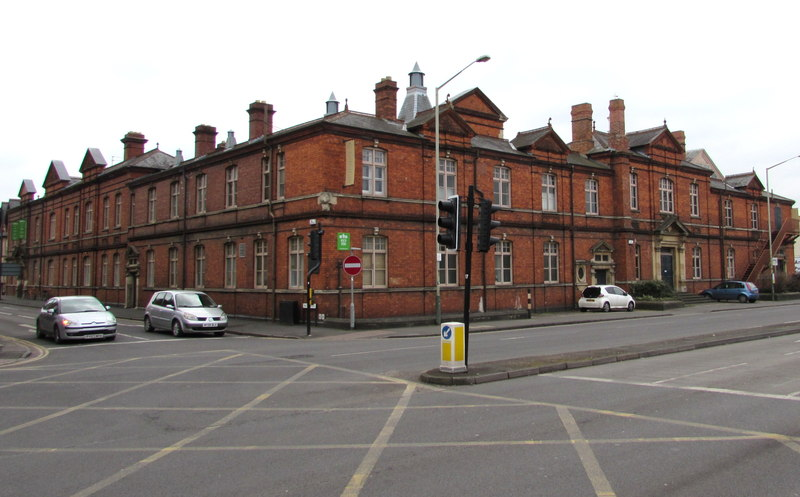
- Health Hydro, March 2015
- Interactive map of Health Hydro
- 51.5606°N 1.7908°W
- Type: Building
- Location: Milton Road, Swindon, Wiltshire

History
- Built: 1891

Site notes
- Architect: JJ Smith
- Architectural style: Queen Anne style
- Governing body: Greenwich Leisure

Listed Building – Grade II*
- Official name: Health Hydro (former GWR Medical Fund Baths and Dispensary)
- Designated: 22 August 2000
- Reference no.: 1382135

Health Hydro is a Grade II* Listed building in Milton Road, Swindon, in the United Kingdom. During its lifetime it has housed large and small swimming pools, a dispensary, medical facilities, wash baths and Victorian Turkish baths. It was built in 1891–2 by the Great Western Railway Medical Fund Society (MFS), aided financially and in kind by the company, and named the GWR Medical Fund Society Baths and Dispensary. It housed purpose-designed rooms and facilities enabling qualified staff to contribute to the medical provision offered by the MFS for the workers in the nearby railway works, and their families.

The building has gone through a series of phases:

- the whole building being run by the MFS, with both baths and medical provision (1892–1947)
- the baths being run by the local council, and the medical facilities run by the National Health Service as the NHS Health Centre (1947–1986)
- the whole building being run by the council, with the Natural Health Clinic occupying what had been the NHS Health Centre (1986–2014)
- the whole building being leased by the council to Greenwich Leisure Ltd, who operate it under the trading name 'Better' (2014 to date).

The name 'Health Hydro' was adopted in 1986 by Thamesdown Borough Council and superseded the NHS Health Centre and Milton Road Baths (1947–86), and before that, the MFS Baths and Dispensary (1892–1947).

== Background ==
The Great Western Railway had been established in 1833 to connect Bristol and London. It reached Swindon in 1840, and transformed it from a small, hilltop market town into an industrial hub. The principal locomotive establishment opened there in 1843 and the town's history was radically changed by the establishment of the Swindon Works. The occurrence of disease and industrial injury created a need for medical provision and the addition of the baths was seen as contributing to the wellbeing of the workforce.

The GWR Medical Fund Society (MFS) was founded in 1847.

== Location ==
The site is at the southern end of the Swindon Railway Village Conservation Area and comprises the former Milton Road Baths and NHS Health Centre (the "Health Hydro"). To the north, beyond Faringdon Road, lies the Railway Village. To the east is Milton Road. To the south and west lies Chester Street.

== 1891–1947: GWR Medical Fund Baths and Dispensary ==
The building which was later to house the Health Hydro was built in 1891–92 by the Medical Fund Society. In 1885 the MFS bought land on the south side of Faringdon Road for £999. The old dispensary at the back of the hospital was oversubscribed. The 1868 swimming baths were without adequate facilities and ill-located within the works' site.

The washing baths were added in 1899 with 1st, 2nd and 3rd class baths and a spray bath. The Victorian Turkish baths, with their complementary steam room, were added later, opening on 10 December 1906, and replacing the fund's earlier Victorian Turkish baths in Taunton Street. Further additions were made in 1911. The building's principal elements were a dispensary, swimming baths, washing (or slipper) baths, and the Turkish bath with its plunge pool, shampooing room, and complementary Russian bath. There were also medical consulting rooms for a variety of purposes.

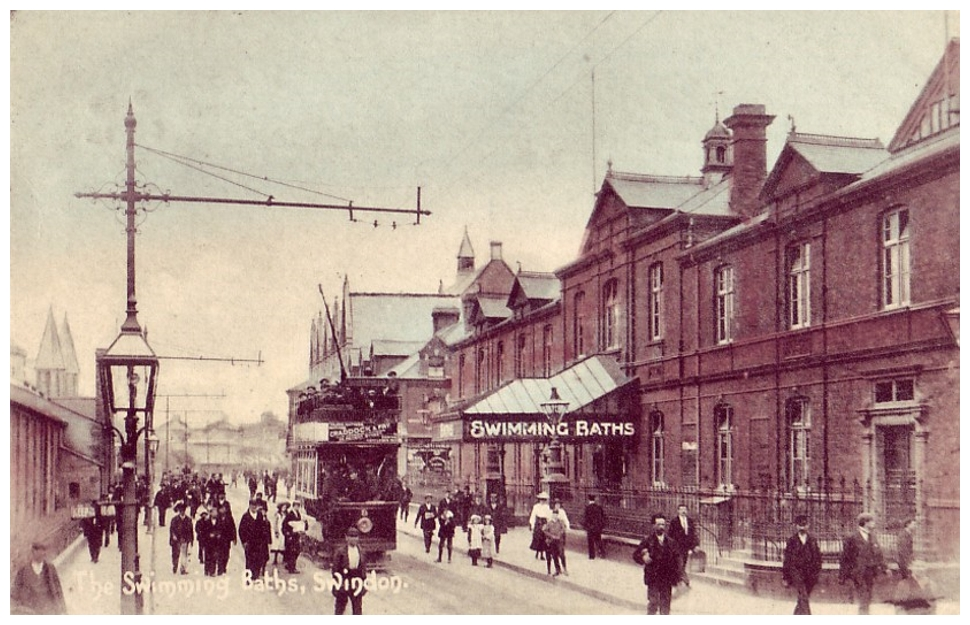
Medical Fund Baths and Dispensary Viewed from Faringdon Road, 1905

The provision of Victorian Turkish baths by the MFS was part of the Victorian Turkish baths movement. The Turkish baths in the Health Hydro are the oldest Victorian Turkish baths institution still operating worldwide.

The large swimming pool was originally for men, while the small pool was for women and children.

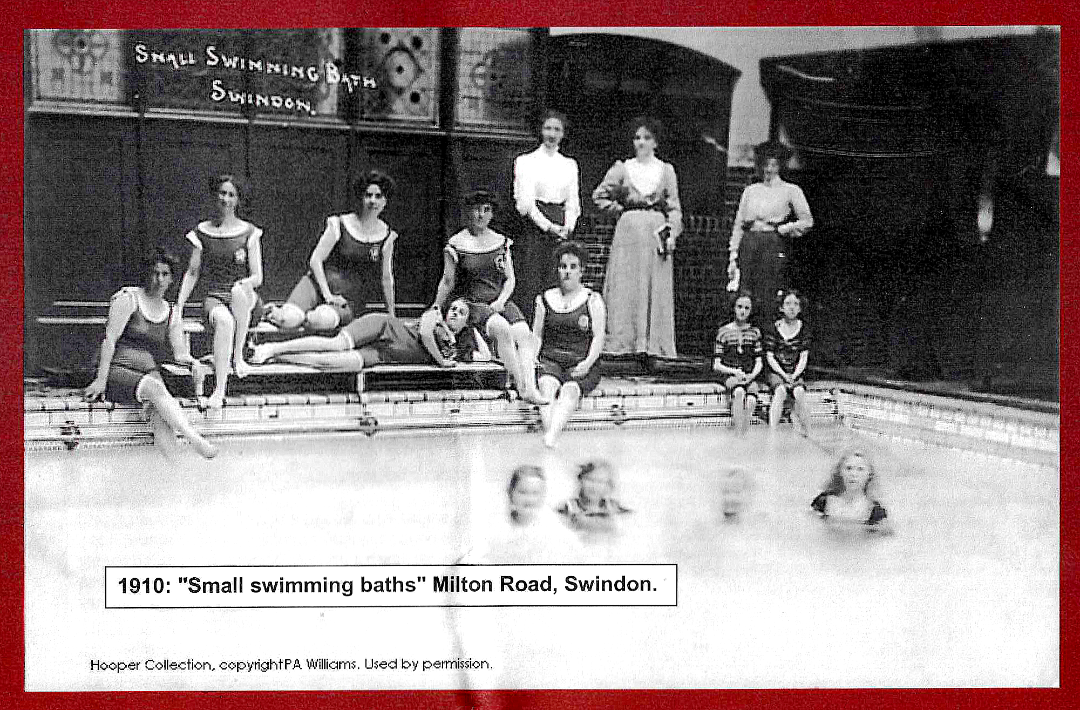
Ladies in the Small Pool, 1910

The buildings are in a Queen Anne style. The swimming pools have iron roof trusses made in the railway works. There are stained glass windows, ceramic bricks, red brick and hardwoods. The large pool is 33 1/3 metres long, five lanes wide, and 1 to 2 metres deep.

In 1905 there were 11 doctors, a dental surgeon, an assistant dentist and seven dispensers on the staff. There was a dispensary, washing baths, a dentistry, invalid chairs, swimming baths, hairdressing and shaving salons.

During the First World War, the GWR works were taken over for the war effort, and the MFS buildings were used as a military hospital with the swimming pools floored over to create large hospital ward spaces; this work was reversed after 1918.

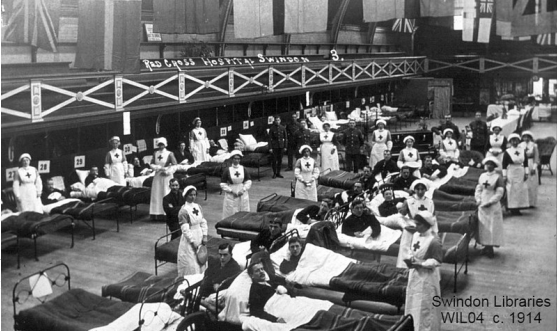
The large pool hall as part of a Red Cross Hospital in 1914

By 1947, when the National Health Service was being planned and the MFS consequently was being wound up, the MFS Baths and Dispensary had two swimming pools; Turkish, Russian and washing baths; doctors; a dispensary; dental surgeries and dental laboratory; a skin clinic and ophthalmology, chiropody, psychology and physiotherapy departments.

== 1947–1985: NHS Health Centre and Milton Road Baths ==
After 1947 the Milton Road Health Centre was housed in the 'dry side' of the building. There was a GP (General Practitioner) medical practice, a pharmacy, chiropodists and opticians. Little brass checks were issued to those waiting for doctors' appointments downstairs.

When the rail works was still in operation, the swimming pool water was pumped ¾ mile to the baths through a tunnel from the works. In the winter months it was not practicable to keep the pools operating and the large pool was boarded over for dances, roller-skating, boxing competitions and a Royal Hunt Ball.

== 1986–2014: Health Hydro ==
Milton Road Health Centre closed in 1985. Doctors, chiropodists, pharmacists and opticians moved to a new complex in Carfax Street, Swindon.

The large and small pools and the Turkish baths continued to operate. In the pools, as well as swimming, canoeing, scuba diving, lifesaving and aquarobics were offered. Swimming lessons were available for adults and juniors.

The Natural Health Clinic was set up. Acupuncture, Alexander techniques, aromatherapy, hypnotherapy, homeopathy, massage, first aid, stress management, overweight therapy, reflexology, rebirthing, yoga, and numbertherapy were all on offer. There was a Well Woman Centre. There were exercise rooms associated with the Turkish baths, with sun beds and infrared sauna.

In 1993 the tunnel between the baths and the former rail works had been flooded for some time and British Rail filled it in. The building was designated as Grade II* listed in 2000 for its architectural and historic interest, as well as group value with the other Railway Village buildings on the opposite side of Faringdon Road.

== 2014 to the present day ==
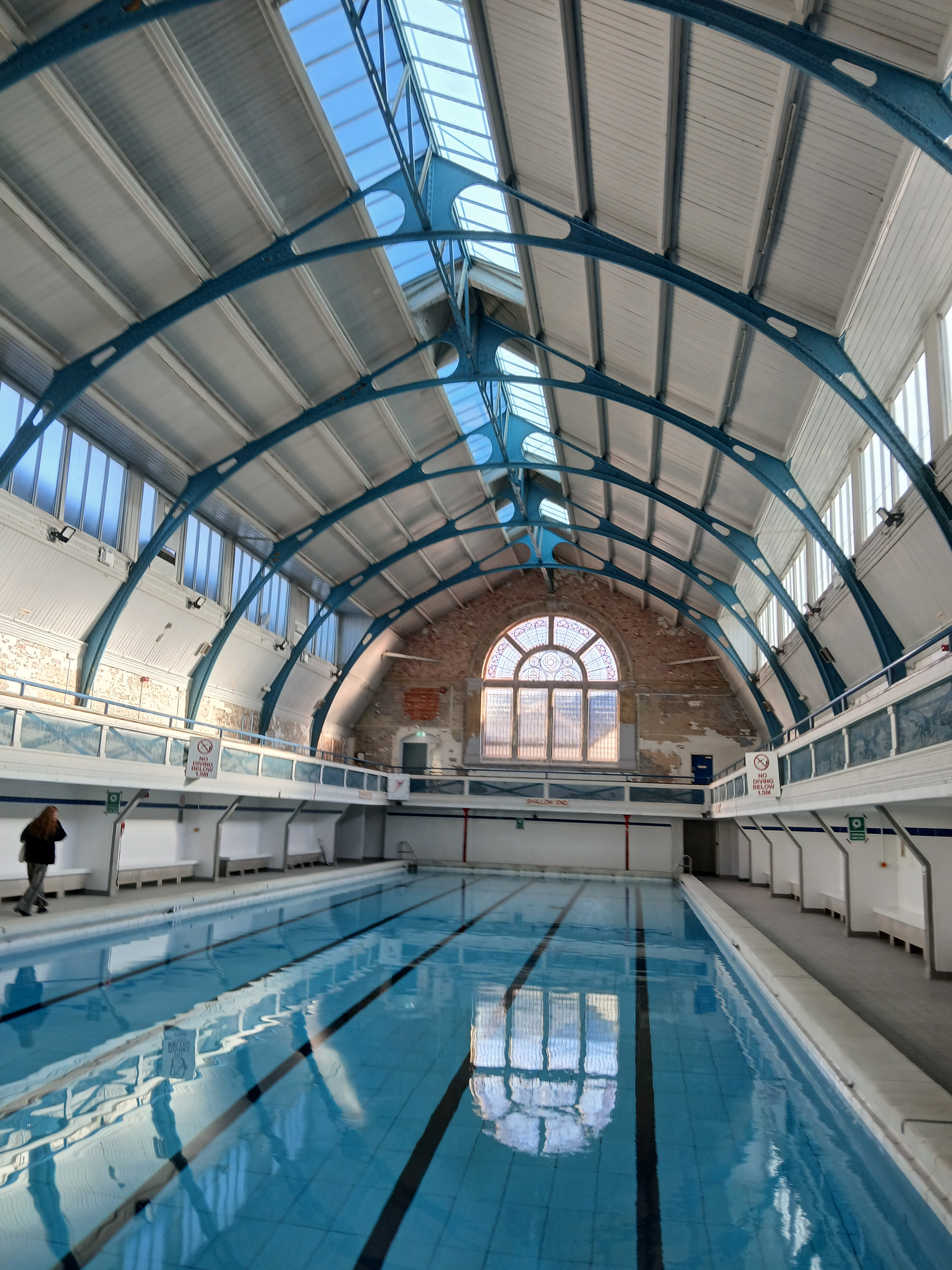
The Large Pool Hall in December 2025 after refurbishment

In 2014, Greenwich Leisure Ltd (trading as Better) took over the operation of Swindon’s leisure centres, including the Health Hydro, on a 25-year lease. Both pools and the Turkish baths continued to operate until the small pool was closed in January 2016.

In March 2021, the Towns Fund awarded £5 million to the Health Hydro, which, combined with £1.5 million from Swindon Borough Council, enabled a first phase of refurbishment works to start. External repairs to brickwork, windows and roofs was financed by Historic England.

In December 2025, urgent work to repair the roof of the Turkish baths was undertaken, funded by Historic England's Heritage at Risk Fund.

The building was reopened on 19 January 2026, on completion of the first phase of refurbishment. The building's plant had been replaced, new changing areas and a gym installed, and access to the large pool and Turkish baths improved. The large pool, though open, needs further refurbishment which awaits additional funding.

Further issues were uncovered in the Turkish baths for which further funding has to be sought, thus there is currently no projected date for their re-opening.

== See also ==
- Victorian Turkish baths, Swindon
- Swindon Mechanics' Institute
