= Articled clerk =

Trainee lawyer or accountant

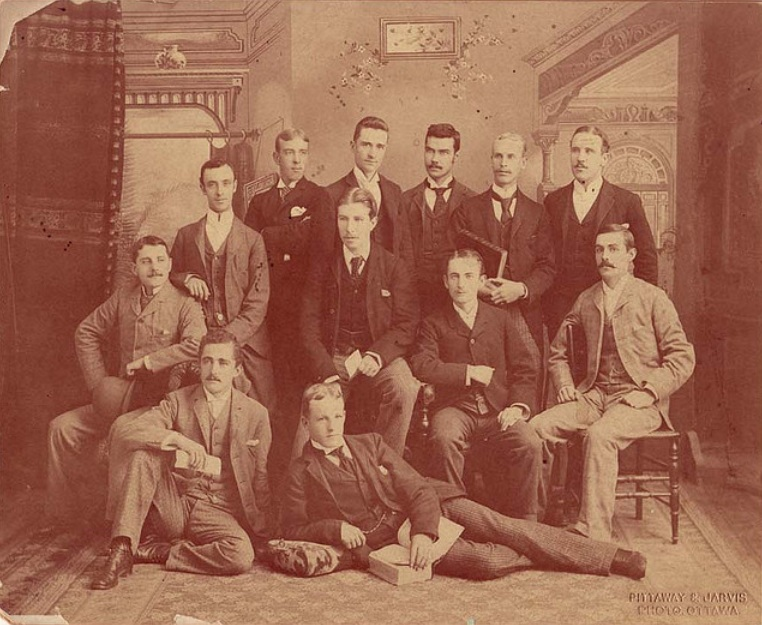
A group of articling students in 1891 in Ottawa, Ontario, Canada

An articled clerk in Commonwealth countries is studying to be an accountant or a lawyer under the supervision of someone already in the profession, now usually for two years, but previously three to five years was common. This is similar to an intern for a company. Trainees sign articles of clerkship, a contract committing them to a fixed period of employment. Wharton's Law Lexicon defines an articled clerk as "a pupil of a solicitor, who undertakes, by articles of clerkship, continuing covenants, mutually binding, to instruct him in the principles and practice of the profession". The contract is with a specific partner, not with the firm as a whole.

Nowadays, some professions in some countries prefer to use the term "students" or "trainees" (e.g., a trainee solicitor) and the articles of clerkship "training contracts" through process of Experiential Education.

Apprentice architects can also be articled. Henry Percy Adams articled to Brightwen Binyon (1846–1909), architect.

== Australia ==
Previously in Australia, law graduates seeking to become a lawyer, through their state's legal admissions board, were required to complete articles of clerkship (commonly referred to as "articles"). Since then, the process was reorganised wherein law graduates are required to complete a practical legal training (PLT) course prior to admission. Nowadays, clerkships are typically placements at a law firm for currently studying law students spanning some weeks, wherein the intern (clerk) may be considered for that firm's graduate intake.

== Canada ==
Canadian lawyers must pass a period of experiential training after graduating from law school, either through 10 months of articles or by completing an alternative program developed by the provincial bar to which they seek to be called. Depending on the province, students may also be required to pass a bar exam in the form of Professional Legal Training and Certification during their year of articles.

== India ==
In India, after clearing their initial exams students of chartered accountancy are required to registered themselves with a partner of a firm registered with the Institute of Chartered Accountants of India. They must serve their articles for a period of 18 months, followed by industrial training for 2.5–3 years.

== Sri Lanka ==
In Sri Lanka, student members of the Institute of Chartered Accountants of Sri Lanka are required to serve as a clerk serving under articles with a member of the Institute in practice or with a member of the Institute who is a salaried employee in the service of a firm of accountants for a minimum three-year practical training period. They are known as articled clerks during this period.

== See also ==
- Apprenticeship
- Reading law
