= Henry Percy Adams =

British architect (1865–1930)

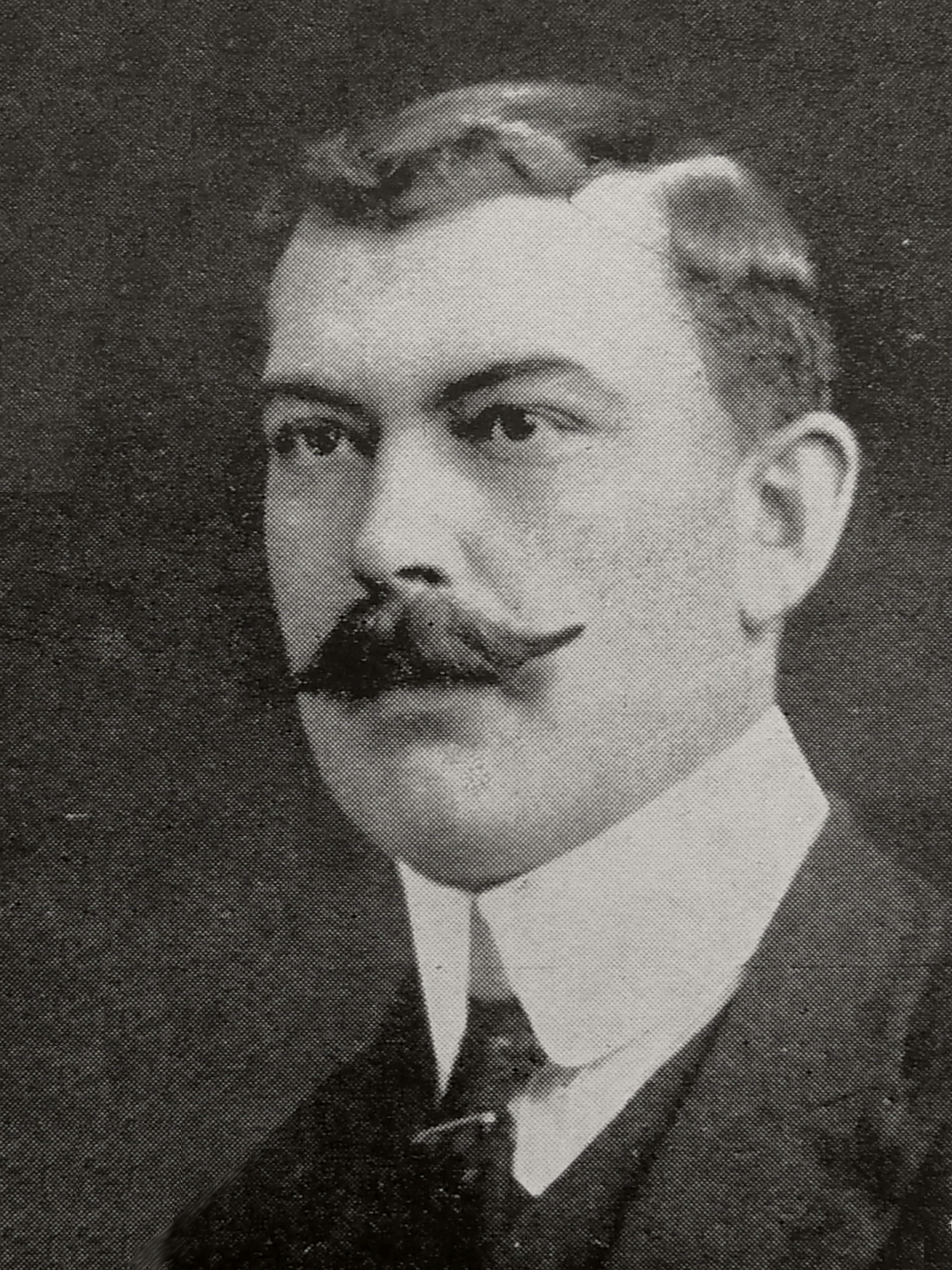
- Born: 26 October 1865; Ipswich, Suffolk
- Died: 7 April 1930 (aged 64); Westminster, London,
- Occupation: Architect
- Awards: RIBA Drawing Prize in 1888; Donaldson Medal (for Architecture) (1896); Godwin Bursary (1897)
- Practice: Adams, Holden & Pearson
- Buildings: Dorking New Infirmary in Surrey

Henry Percy Adams (26 October 1865 – 7 April 1930), born Harry Percy Adams, and known professionally as H. Percy Adams, was an Ipswich-born English architect, and fellow of RIBA. He specialised in planning for the building of hospitals.

== Early life and education ==
Henry Percy Adams was born 26 October 1865 to Alice (née Heal) (1840–1888) and Webster Adams (1841–1900), a surgeon in Ipswich. His birth name was Harry Percy Adams; his birth and death certificates carry the name, "Harry". (Note: GRO Index: Births Dec 1865 Adams Harry Percy Ipswich 4a 546. Deaths Jun 1930 Adams Harry P. 64 St. Geo. H. Sq. 1a 467.)

He was educated at Epsom College together with his brother Webster Angell Adams (1864–1895). Adams left Epsom in 1879 and moved to Gould House, Dedham, Essex, later he articled under Brightwen Binyon (1846–1909) - a locally known architect in Ipswich.

Adams was also a painter and exhibiting member of the Ipswich Fine Art Club. He exhibited in 1886 a watercolour painting called 'Old Windmill' and two monochrome sketches: 'St. Martin's church, Cologne' and 'Tomb of Sir Walter Scott'. Later he exhibited at the Royal Academy in 1888.

== Career in architecture ==
In 1888, Adams joined the architectural office of Stephen Salter (1825–1896) at 19 Hanover Square, London. In the same year he won a Drawing Prize of the RIBA in 1888.

In 1897 he won the Donaldson Medal (for Architecture) and Godwin Bursary (established by George Godwin).

1913 Adams took over Stephen Salter's architectural practice.

Charles Holden, (originally his assistant in 1899 and then later his Chief designer) and Lionel Pearson (1879–1953, who had attended Liverpool University School of Architecture), both joined the practice in 1904. The practice then changed its name to Adams, Holden, and Pearson.

== Major works ==
- 1897–98 South wing of Bedford General Hospital, with a separate ward designed specifically for children, known as the 'Victoria Ward'
- 1898 – Staircase Hall, Madresfield Court Worcestershire
- 1900–1905 Chapel at Royal Victoria Infirmary, Newcastle upon Tyne. Co-designed with W. L. Newcombe.
- 1900 – Dorking New Infirmary in Surrey
- 1901 – The Royal Victoria Infirmary, Newcastle upon Tyne
- 1901 – Unsuccessful competition design entry for Royal Infirmary, Glasgow
- 1903 – General Hospital, Tunbridge Wells, Kent
- 1903 – King Edward VII Sanatorium, near Midhurst, West Sussex (mainly designed by partner Holden; closed in 2006, converted into apartments)
- 1903 – Bedford County Hospital, Bedfordshire
- 1904 – Beyoğlu British Seamen's Hospital, Istanbul, initially founded during the Crimean War by the British Foreign Office. It has a tower that provides a clear sightline of any incoming ships
- 1906 – Woman's Hospital in Soho, London
- 1907/1908 Unsuccessfully bid for the County Hall, London design
- 1909 – House Semon (now known as 'Rignall's Wood'), Great Missenden, Buckinghamshire for Gertrude Jekyll
- 1910 – Bristol Royal Infirmary New Ward & Pavilions, Gloucestershire (with Charles Holden)
- 1910 – Savoy Place, before the (Institution of Electrical Engineers) (IEE) moved in, alterations to the building were carried out by H Percy Adams and Charles Holden. This included renovation of the entrance hall, the lecture theatre and the creation of a library from the long room on the first floor

== Personal life ==
On 22 May 1890, he married Cicillia Clara Staddon (1865–1891) in Ipswich, Suffolk. In 1891 their son was born, his wife died after giving birth.

In 1896 Henry married Alice Mildred Mathieson (aunt of Sir Frederick Ashton). They had two sons and a daughter.

Adams died on 7 April 1930 at Westminster Hospital in London, aged 64.
