= St Mark's Church, Swindon =

Coordinates: 51.5612°N 1.7947°W

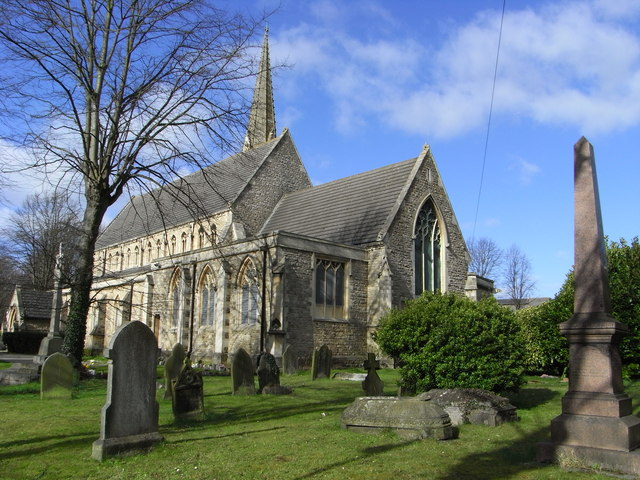
- St Mark's Church, Swindon, from the south-east

- Location in Wiltshire
- OS grid reference: SU 143 847
- Location: Church Place, Swindon, Wiltshire
- Country: England
- Denomination: Church of England
- Churchmanship: Traditional Catholic (Forward in Faith)
- Website: swindonnewtown.co.uk/our-churches/

History
- Status: Parish church
- Dedication: Saint Mark
- Dedicated: 25 April 1845

Architecture
- Functional status: Active
- Heritage designation: Grade II listed
- Designated: 2 October 1951
- Architect(s): Scott and Moffatt, Temple Moore
- Architectural type: Church
- Style: Gothic Revival
- Groundbreaking: 1843
- Completed: 1897

Specifications
- Materials: Limestone, roofed in tiles and lead

Administration
- Province: Province of Canterbury
- Diocese: Diocese of Bristol
- Archdeaconry: Malmesbury
- Deanery: Swindon
- Parish: Swindon New Town

Clergy
- Bishop: Rt Revd Paul Thomas SSC (AEO)

St Mark's Church in central Swindon, Wiltshire, England is an active Anglican parish church in the deanery of Swindon, the archdeaconry of Malmesbury, and the diocese of Bristol. Its benefice is united with those of St Aldhelm, Swindon, St Luke, Swindon, and St Saviour, Swindon, to form the benefice of Swindon New Town. The church is recorded in the National Heritage List for England as a Grade II listed building.

== History ==
St Mark's was built to serve workers of the Great Western Railway, whose Swindon Works were nearby. George Henry Gibbs, the head of the merchant bank Anthony Gibbs & Sons who died in 1842, bequeathed £500 towards building a church and a school in the town. In February 1843, the railway company appealed for contributions from the public, and a total of £6,000 (equivalent to £630,000 in 2025) was raised to build the church.

The church was designed by George Gilbert Scott and William Moffatt, and built between 1843 and 1845. It was dedicated to St Mark on 25 April 1845, St Mark's Day. In 1897 Temple Moore added a north vestry.

The parish is within the Anglo-Catholic tradition of the Church of England, and rejects the ordination of women as priests and bishop. It has passed Resolutions A and B of the Priests (Ordination of Women) Measure 1993 (meaning women cannot preside at Mass at the church), and it receives Alternative Episcopal Oversight from the Bishop of Oswestry.

== Architecture ==
=== Exterior ===
The church is constructed in limestone with roofs of tiles and lead. Its plan consists of a five-bay nave with a clerestory, a north aisle and a south aisle with a three-bay chapel, a south porch, a three-bay chancel with a south chapel and a north vestry, and a north steeple opposite the porch. It is in Decorated Gothic style. The tower is in four stages, and has a north door, angle buttresses, and two-light louvred bell openings. It is surmounted by a crocketted spire with lucarnes rising to 140 feet (43 m). At the west end of the nave is a doorway and a window with five lights containing curvilinear tracery. Along the sides of the aisles are two-light windows with tracery in varying styles. The east window in the chancel has three lights.

=== Interior ===
Inside the church, the arcades are carried on quatrefoil piers. The nave has a hammerbeam roof, and the roof of the chancel is barrel vaulted. The stained glass includes windows by Kempe. The pipe organ was built in 1922 by Jardine of Manchester. It was rebuilt in 1961 by Percy Daniel of Clevedon. In 1973 the organ was destroyed by fire and Persy Daniel replaced it with a three-manual organ moved from a redundant church in the north of England. There is a ring of eight bells. Six of these were cast in 1904 by Llewellins and James, and the other two in 1927 by Mears and Stainbank of the Whitechapel Bell Foundry.

== Musical tradition ==
St Mark's has a long tradition of performing choral music in the style of an English cathedral. The choir sings at the weekly Parish Mass and at other services, has a repertoire of over 30 masses, and has recorded two CDs. In 1944 Benjamin Britten composed his Festival Te Deum for the centenary of the church, where it was first performed on 24 April 1945.

== Churchyard ==
The churchyard contains several notable memorials and notable burials.

=== The Gooch Tomb ===
Monument to Emma Brent Gooch (1872) and her husband William Frederick Gooch (1915). William was the youngest brother of Sir Daniel Gooch, trained as an engineer under him, and became manager of the GWR Works. He died in 1915 and is buried elsewhere, but is commemorated by the addition of an inscription to his wife's monument. In 2016, the tomb which had been lost beneath undergrowth was uncovered and cleaned as part of the Swindon 175 commemorations.

=== Armstrong monument ===
Polished pink granite obelisk to Joseph Armstrong, 1877, later inscribed to his wife and children Sarah, George and Joseph, and to John Burdon. Armstrong was Superintendent of the GWR Works. His funeral was held in the church on 9 June 1877, and on that day shops closed, special trains were put on and a temporary platform was built. Over 6,000 mourners attended the service.

=== Frederick Hawksworth ===
Frederick William Hawksworth was the last Chief Mechanical Engineer of the Great Western Railway. He died in 1976 and his ashes were buried in the churchyard.

== St Mark's Vicarage ==
The former vicarage was built in 1844, in Church Place, by Moffatt and Scott. It is now known as The Hub and is the home of Playsteps Church Place Nursery.
