= Swindon Mechanics' Institute =

Education and theatre building in Swindon, England

Coordinates: 51°33′42″N 1°47′28″W

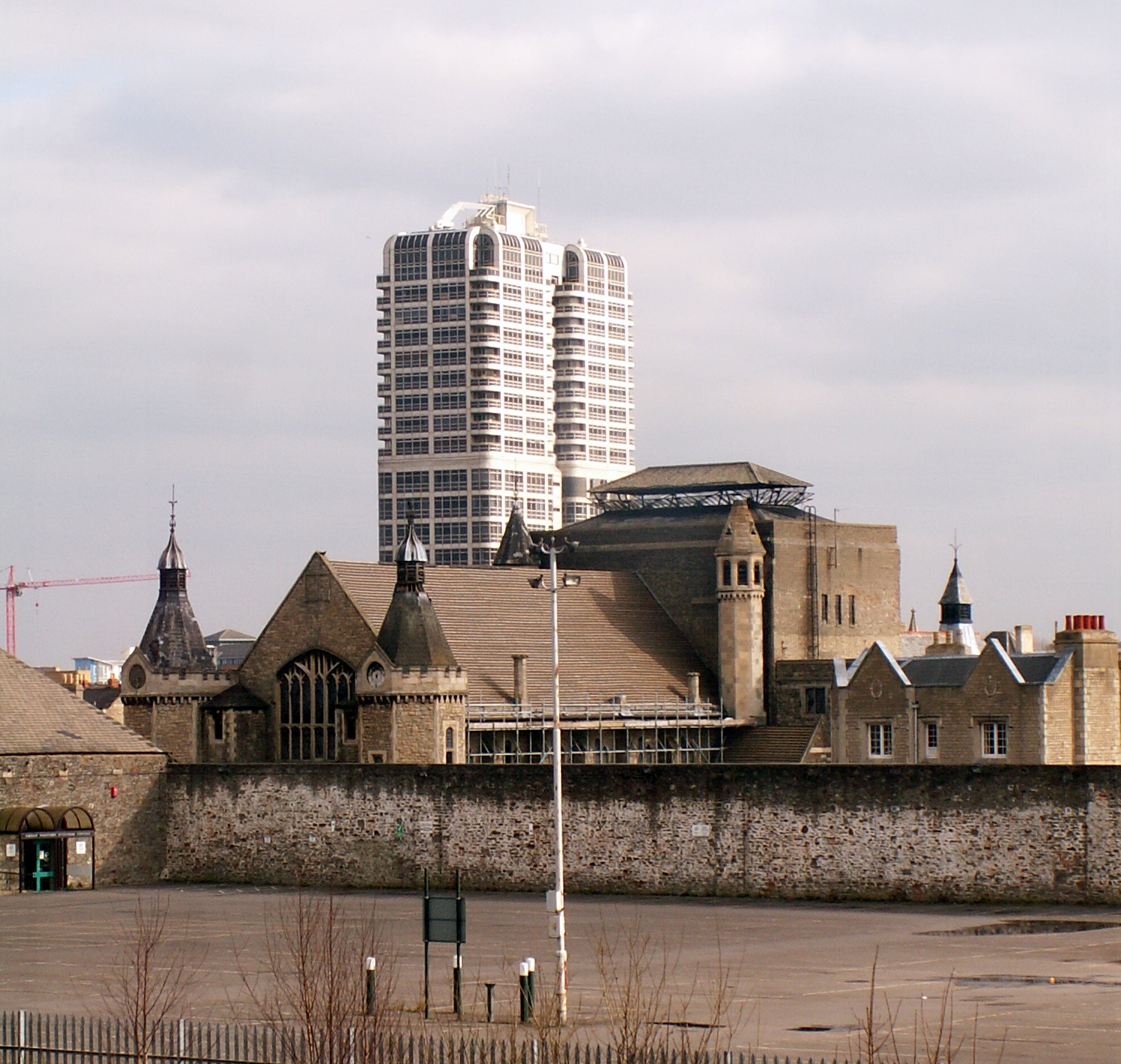
The former Swindon Mechanics' Institute (foreground), 2005

Swindon Mechanics' Institute (MI) was a mechanics' institute founded in 1843 in Swindon, Wiltshire, England, to provide adult education for people employed at the Great Western Railway company's Swindon Works. A building was constructed for the institute, partly at GWR expense, in the Railway Village area in 1854–55. The Grade II* listed building has been disused since the closure of the works in 1986 and is in a poor state of repair.

== History ==
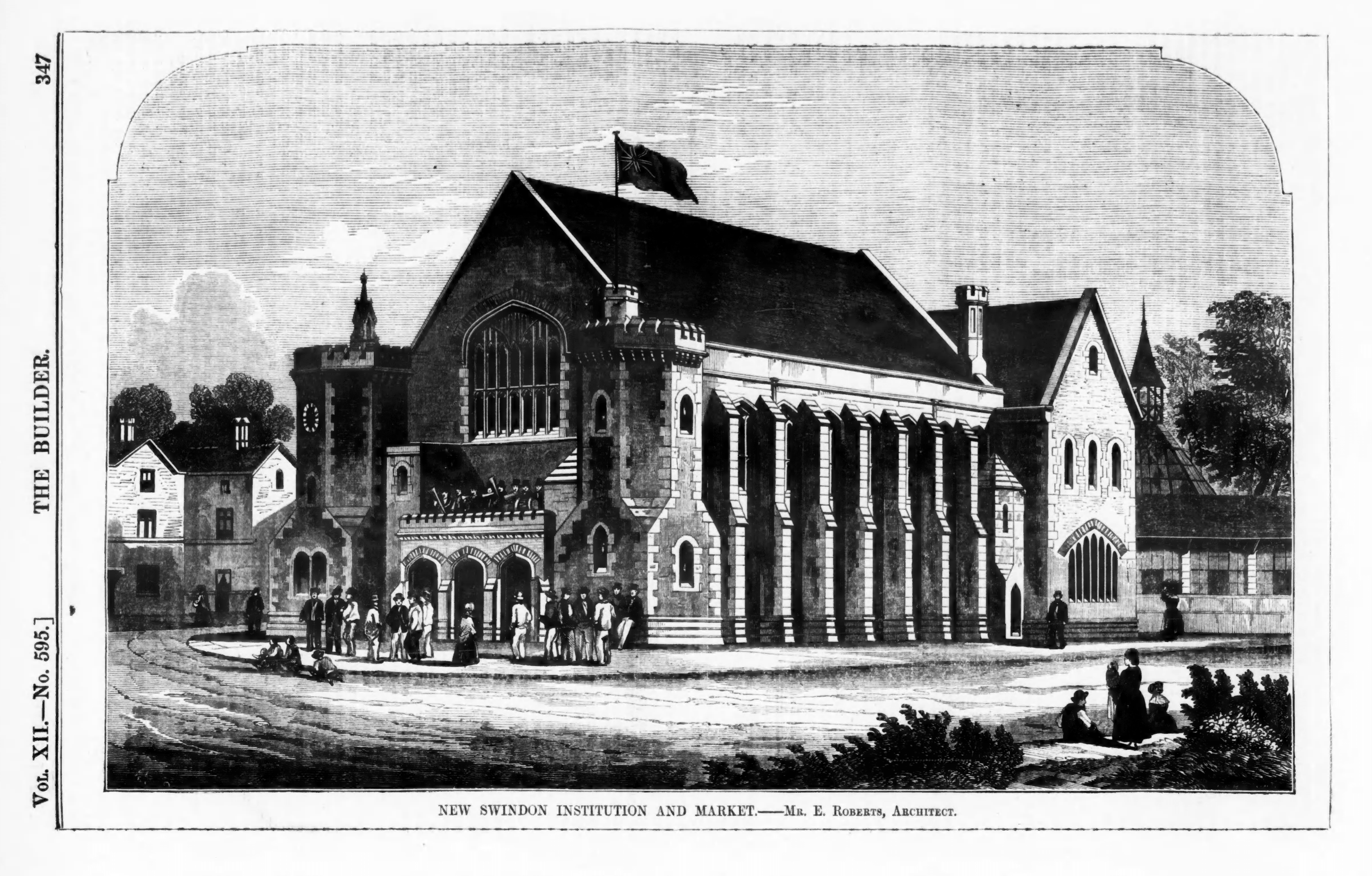
Edward Roberts's original design for the Institute

A library was started in Swindon in 1843, and the Mechanics' Institute was founded "for the purpose of disseminating useful knowledge and encouraging rational amusement" among the Great Western Railway's employees. The first president was Daniel Gooch. There were fifteen founder members, and the library then held about 130 books. There were lectures, evening classes and social events as well as the library.

On 1 September 1853 Daniel Gooch made a proposal to the GWR board. The New Swindon Improvement Company would be formed to provide an MI building and an adjoining market hall. GWR would provide land for the building at a yearly peppercorn rent of 5s. GWR would also make an annual contribution providing there were technical lessons and a library. £4,000 of funds were raised by selling shares to the Swindon Railway Village's inhabitants.

Paid for via subscription by the GWR workers based at Swindon Railway Works, the building was designed and constructed by Edward Roberts and completed in 1855. It contained a lending library and provided health services to workers. It was enlarged in 1892-93 to a design by Brightwen Binyon. The building was constructed in Swindon stone from a nearby quarry, with dressings in Bath stone.

The MI's officers were involved in founding and running the GWR Medical Fund Society (started in 1847) and the Swindon Permanent Building Society (started in 1868). The success of the collective self-help organisations of the Railway Village led to the creation of a plethora of societies, clubs, associations and institutions - all run by ordinary people.

In March 1843 there were 15 members of the MI. In 1943 the number was 7,879. In 1877 the library had expanded to 3.649 volumes. By 1943 the library held more than 250,000 books.

Lectures, technical and arts education and exhibitions were on offer. Talks were not just on technical matters, for instance there were talks on Benjamin Franklin, Stephenson and Richard Cobden and 'People we meet and how to read them'. In 1855 the MI demonstrated railway signals and models of a variety of engines in South Devon and in 1960 there was an exhibition in the MI building of prints and loco models. From the start of the MI in 1843 art classes were offered and in the 1880s the Education Board Committee of the Swindon MI was providing adult art classes alongside science and technical classes.

In 1860, the MI's Amateur Dramatic Society were advertising their theatrical performances. Dramas and variety shows were performed in the MI’s Playhouse Theatre. As early as1855 a performance by the ‘celebrated’ band of the New Swindon Mechanics' Institute was advertised. Harry Stanley Fairclough turned Swindon into a leading centre of opera, teaching choral and orchestral classes at the Swindon College. In 1946 The Times acknowledged that Swindon was the place to see Russian opera.

Around 1920, variety of games and sports was on offer, including chess, billiards, football and rifle shooting.

The building was designated as Grade II* listed in 1970, and the Railway Village was designated as a conservation area in 1975. When the institute was closed in 1986 (the same year as the closure of the railway works) there was an outcry from the clubs and societies that were still using the building.

After closure, the building was left unused and neglected. In the 1980s British Rail Engineering offered the building to Thamesdown Council (predecessors to Swindon Borough Council) for £11 but the council declined the offer. The building was bought by Mountmead Ltd, who applied for planning permission in 1988 for partial demolition and rebuilding, with extensions, for use as a hotel. Permission was denied and by 1995 action was being taken against Mountmead to make the building safe. In 2003 the building was acquired by Forefront Estates. When Forefront Estates was dissolved in 2012 ownership of the MI transferred to the Crown. In August 2017 Forefront Estates came back into being and resumed ownership. In 2019 the council was considering buying the building, which was boarded up, lacked a roof and was in poor repair.

The building is still boarded up and in a poor state of preservation. Forefront Estates have not indicated any interest in the building and its condition has deteriorated further. The building has a strong local following but the absence of the owner makes it difficult to develop a more comprehensive restoration strategy and identify a long-term and sustainable use.
