= Festival Te Deum (Britten) =

- by Benjamin Britten
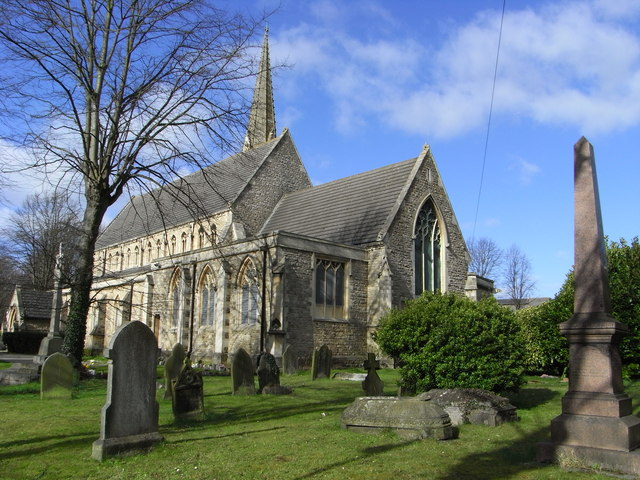
- St Mark's Church, Swindon, which celebrated its centenary with the premiere of the Festival Te Deum
- Key: E major
- Opus: 32
- Text: Te Deum
- Language: English
- Composed: 1944
- Performed: 24 April 1945: St Mark's, Swindon
- Scoring: treble solo; four-part choir (SATB); organ

The Festival Te Deum, Op. 32, a sacred choral piece by the English composer Benjamin Britten, is a setting of the Te Deum from the Book of Common Prayer. It was composed in 1944 to celebrate the centenary of St Mark's Church, Swindon, and was first performed there in 1945.

== History ==
The Te Deum is one of the standard canticles of Anglican Morning Prayer. Benjamin Britten set it in 1934 (his Te Deum in C). He wrote the Festival Te Deum, scored for treble solo, four-part choir (SATB) and organ, on 8–9 November 1944. It takes about five minutes to perform. The work was commissioned for the centenary of St Mark's Church, Swindon, an Anglo-Catholic church with a strong choral tradition. It was first performed there during a service on 24 April 1945 by the choir of St Mark's with choristers from three other Swindon churches (St John's, St Saviour's, and St Luke's). The soloist was Peter Titcombe, the organist was G.W. Curnow, and the conductor was J.J. Gale.

== Music ==
Britten wrote the vocal parts for the abilities of a parish church choir, but a demanding organ part. The work begins with the choir singing in unison, imitating the "freedom of Gregorian chant". The chant sounds as if it is in free time, but is "carefully notated in a variety of time signatures". The organ provides a contrast with chords in regular 3/4 time, embellished with "pseudo-Baroque ornaments". On the text "The glorious company of the Apostles praise Thee", the voices begin imitation but return to unison. In the middle section the text "Thou art the King of Glory, O Christ" is exclaimed in fanfare-like motifs in the voices, matched by "short dramatic outbursts" on the organ. The work ends with a reprise of the organ chords and a treble soloist, joined by the choir, bringing it to a "gentle conclusion".
