= Leone Sinigaglia =

Italian composer

Leone Sinigaglia (14 August 1868 – 16 May 1944) was an Italian composer and mountaineer.

== Biography ==
Born in Turin in 1868 to upper-middle-class Jewish parents, Sinigaglia studied music at its conservatory of music with Giovanni Bolzoni. Sinigaglia knew the leading figures of thought, arts and science in the city, such as Galileo Ferraris, Cesare Lombroso, and Leonardo Bistolfi. A lover of literature and mountaineering from an early age, the young Sinigaglia spent many holidays in or near Cavoretto, just outside the city, which would provide him with much inspiration. Among the works composed in these years are the Romanza opus 3 for horn and string quartet. This has been recorded in an arrangement for horn and string orchestra.

In 1888 Sinigaglia began to travel: after spells in several European cities, he lived from 1894 in Vienna, where he associated with Johannes Brahms from whom he developed a taste for so-called absolute music, studying with Eusebius Mandyczewski. In these years, he wrote several Lieder and the Concerto for violin and orchestra, opus 20.

From 1900 he worked in Prague with Antonín Dvořák (whom he possibly met through his friendship with the Bohemian Quartet in Vienna). From Dvořák, he learned to apply classical techniques to the arrangement of popular songs.

His productivity diminished progressively in the following decades. Nazi police occupied Turin in 1944 and he was to be sent to Germany as a slave labourer at the age of 76 but suffered a fatal heart attack at the moment of his arrest.

== Musical works ==
In the ten years that followed his return to Turin in 1901, Sinigaglia transcribed an enormous amount of popular song from the oral tradition, largely collected on the hills of Cavoretto. Many of these were arranged for singer and pianoforte in a style that is reminiscent of the German songs of the late 19th century: they include a set of twelve Old popular songs of Piedmont (published initially in Leipzig by Breitkopf & Härtel, 1914; a third and fourth edition were published in 1921, and a fifth and sixth in 1927). As well as this collection, for which Sinigaglia's name is still remembered, his other compositions of the same period show a deep love for the musical spirit of his native region, for example in the two Piedmontese Dances opus 31 (1905) and the Suite for orchestra "Piemonte" (1909). Both of these are closely identified with the name of Arturo Toscanini, who performed them frequently.

It was not only ethnically-inspired works that resulted from these happy years: the overture to The Chiozzotte Quarrels (1907), as well as the Piedmontese works, were directed by conductors of the calibre of Wilhelm Furtwängler and John Barbirolli. Toscanini included the music in broadcast concerts by the NBC Symphony Orchestra. Among his chamber works that are still remembered are the two sonatas, opus 41 for cello and pianoforte, and opus 44 for violin and pianoforte.

== Mountaineering ==
Sinigaglia was a keen mountain climber in his youth, amassing an impressive catalogue of ascents in the Dolomites. He has been described as "the first great Italian climber in the Dolomites". Two of his most famous climbs were first ascents of Cima Ambrizzola and Monte Cristallo. His book, Climbing reminiscences of the Dolomites, was published in English in 1898, shortly after the Italian edition, and is still regarded as a classic of climbing literature. Sinigaglia also took part in an attempt on the Matterhorn as a client of the renowned guide Jean Antoine Carrel (the first guide that completed the ascent on the italian side, on the 17th of July 1865) and Carlo Gorret. The party aimed to repeat Carrel’s historic ascent via the Lion Ridge, but the expedition was hindered by severe weather and exhaustion. During the climb Carrel fell ill and died on the mountain, an event that deeply marked Sinigaglia and was widely reported in contemporary mountaineering circles.

== Other compositions ==
=== Chamber works ===
- Romanza for horn and string quartet, opus 3 (1889?).
- Konzert-Etude (Concert-Study) for string quartet, opus 5.
- Drei romantische Stücke für Violine mit Clavierbegleitung (Three Romantic pieces for violin with piano accompaniment), opus 13. published in 1902 by the Danish publisher Wilhelm Hansen.
- Twelve variations on a theme by Franz Schubert, for oboe and piano, opus 19
- String quartet in D major, opus 27. Published by Breitkopf & Härtel in 1906.
- Piece for horn and piano, opus 28 (recorded by Frøydis Ree Wekre, horn and Zita Carno, piano on a Crystal Records LP, transferred to CD.)
- Serenade for string trio in D, opus 33 (published by Breitkopf in 1908)
- Hora Mystica for string quartet; published by Richault et C. in Paris

=== String orchestra (or with string orchestra) ===
- Adagio tragico, opus 21 (recorded by Jiri Starek and the RIAS Sinfonietta on Koch Schwann)

=== Orchestra ===
- Lamento in memoria di un giovane artista (Natale Canti), opus 38. Published by Breitkopf & Härtel in 1930.
- Ouvertüre zu Goldonis Lustspiel Le Baruffe Chiozzotte, opus 32. Published by Breitkopf & Härtel in 1908.
- Piemonte: suite per orchestra sopra temi popolari, opus 36 (published in reduced form by Breitkopf, 1912). In 4 sections.

== Bibliography ==
- Sinigaglia, Leone. Climbing reminiscences of the Dolomites. With an introduction by Edmund J. Garwood. Tr. by Mary Alice Vialls]. London: T. F. Unwin, 1896. xxiii, 224 p. 39 plates (incl. front.) fold. map. 25 cm.
- Sinigaglia, Leone. 36 Vechhie canzoni popolari del Piemonte, annotated reprint of the Breitkopf & Härtel edition, ed. by L.Benone Giacoletto and A.Lanza, Torino: G.Zedde, 2002
- Sinigaglia, Leone. La raccolta inedita di 104 canzoni popolari piemontesi, ed. by Andrea Lanza, Torino: G.Zedde, 2004
- Gianluca La Villa-Annalisa Lo Piccolo. "Leone Sinigaglia, la musica delle alte vette" ed. by Gabrielli editori, Verona, 2012

== Documents ==
Letters by Leone Sinigaglia are held by the State Archives in Leipzig, company archives of the Music Publishing House C.F.Peters (Leipzig).
