= Victorian Turkish baths, Swindon =

Victorian Turkish baths in Swindon, England

Coordinates: 51.5604°N 1.7906°W

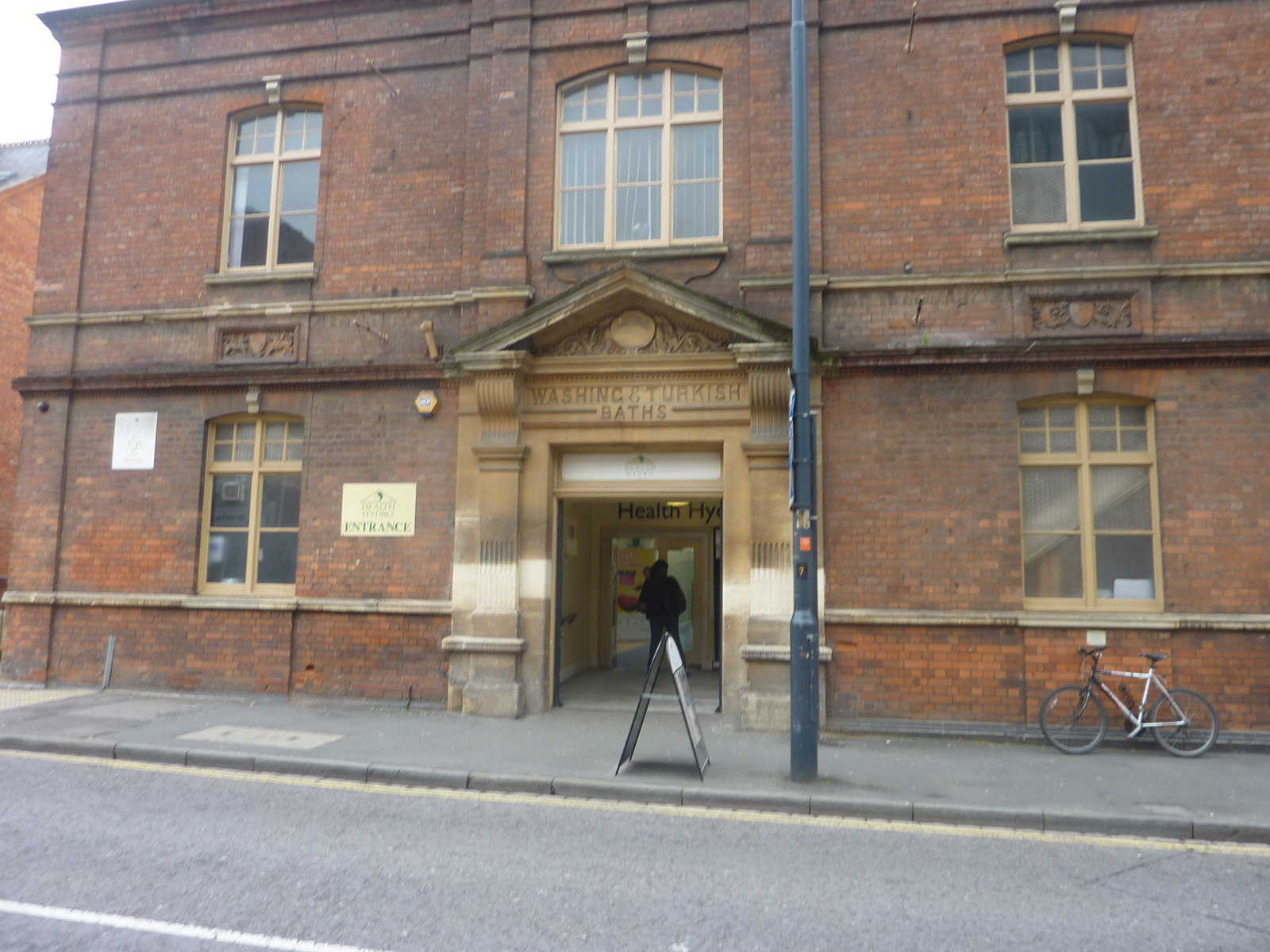
Milton Street entrance to the Turkish baths in the GWR Medical Fund Baths & Dispensary's 1891 Faringdon Road building

Victorian Turkish baths have existed in Swindon, England since 1868 and persist as the longest surviving Victorian Turkish baths establishment, not only in the British Isles, but also in the world.

In 1860, the Great Western Railway Company (GWR) approved the provision of Turkish baths for its workers and their families by its Medical Fund Society (MFS), (Note: The Medical Fund Society developed from the company's compulsory subscription sick fund founded in 1847. During the following hundred years the society increased its facilities to include a wide range of medical, dental and hospital services housed, after the early 1890s, in a new baths and dispensary building on Faringdon Road. The comprehensiveness of its specific medical services became a model for the 1947 National Health Service.) provided the society paid for them. This condition delayed the implementation of the fund's proposal and it was not until 1 October 1868 that its first Turkish baths opened in Taunton Street. The current Turkish baths opened on 10 December 1906 in the fund's new Faringdon Road Baths and Dispensary building, with its own entrance in Milton Street. This building is a Grade II* Listed building.

In 1948 the fund's medical services became part of the newly formed NHS, and its building renamed the NHS Health Centre and Milton Road Baths. In 1986, the Thamesdown Borough Council (renamed Swindon Borough Council in 1997) became responsible for the Turkish and swimming baths. These were refurbished and, with other facilities, relaunched as the Swindon Health Hydro. The management of The Hydro was later outsourced, and it is currently managed by Greenwich Leisure, trading as Better.

The Turkish baths have been closed for refurbishment since 2023 and work on repairing the roof is in progress. However, the baths themselves still need refurbishment and this remains dependent on further funding. There is currently no projected date for their re-opening.

== Background and the first baths ==
New Swindon was originally a company town built for its workers by the Great Western Railway Company. In addition to housing, the company provided educational, religious, and health facilities, the latter under the aegis of its Medical Fund Society.

In February 1858, its Mechanics’ Institute invited David Urquhart to talk about the baths built by his Manchester Foreign Affairs Committee seven months earlier. But due to the death of his baby son, Urquhart’s close associate, Stewart Erskine Rolland, spoke instead. Asked about the cost of such a bath, Rolland offered to build one for £100, able to accommodate 100 persons daily, and costing from fourpence to sixpence a day for fuel. But Turkish baths were still new, and the offer was not taken up.

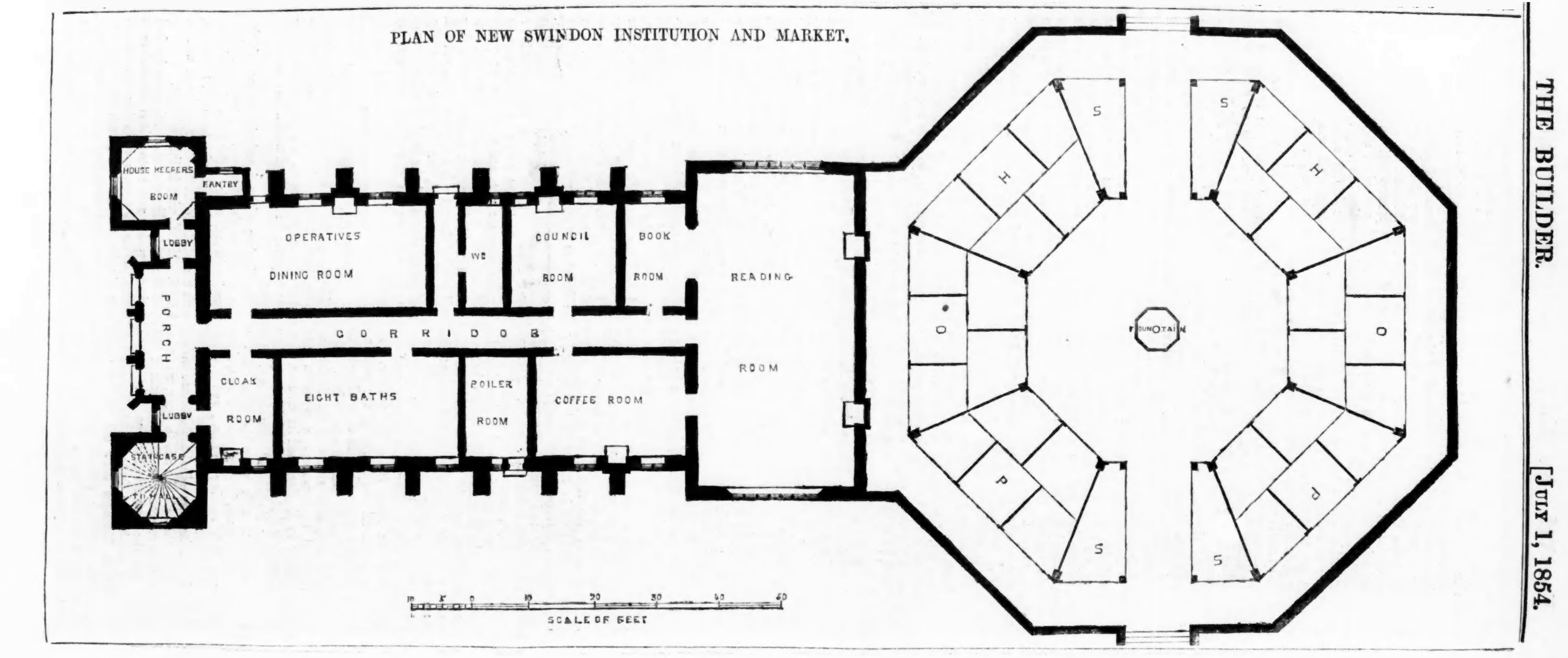
Architect's plan of the Institution and Market at New Swindon. Slipper baths can be seen bottom left of plan.

Shortly afterwards, the company directors were asked whether Turkish baths could be built behind the Mechanics' Institute (which already had eight slipper baths on the first floor). They agreed, provided the fund, which was required to be self-supporting, paid for it. This temporarily killed the proposal, but further discussions were held, most notably in July 1861 when a meeting chaired by William Gooch reconsidered the subject. £250 was a large sum to find, and an opposing amendment defeated the proposal. But it was soon easily recognised that eight slipper baths, without any showers or changing facilities, was totally inadequate for the growing Swindon. In February 1863, it was decided to build a new bathhouse in the yard of The Barracks, nearby. (Note: Not a military establishment, but originally built as a workingmen's lodging house, and later serving changing needs. It still stands in Faringdon Road.)

The baths, now overseen by an elected committee, and managed for them by a Mr West, had to move again in 1868 when The Barracks was converted into a Methodist chapel. A new bathhouse was to be erected on a narrow triangle of land fronting Faringdon Road. Meanwhile, West was successfully running a small Turkish bath, at his home, and in September, the Baths Committee of Management minuted that it would be ‘advantageous to members’ if Turkish baths were included in the new building.

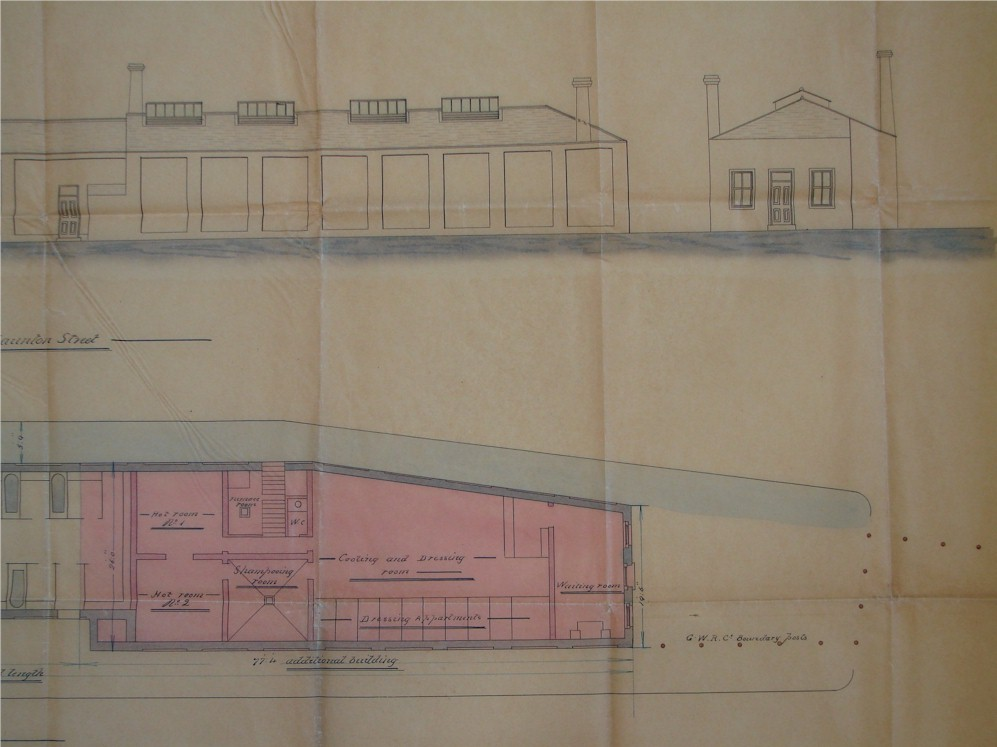
Section and plan of the first GWR Victorian Turkish baths, Swindon

The bathhouse would be divided into two with an entrance to the slipper baths from Faringdon Road and to the Turkish baths from Taunton Street. There would be two hot rooms, a shampooing room, and a cooling-room with nine changing cubicles. West resigned as manager of the original slipper baths, and later, the committee accepted his tender of £30 to run the new baths for 15 months, ‘he to provide all the sheets and accessories needed’ as part of the deal. The Turkish baths were open from 6am till 9pm on weekdays, from 2pm till 9pm on Saturdays, and were reserved for women for three hours every Wednesday afternoon. There were two prices for members, which would have separated the workers from their supervisors and managers.

The new building opened on 1 October 1868, West having closed his own establishment and, by 1869, moved house to Taunton Street. By 1878, leasing the baths by tender ceased, and the manager became a paid employee. Opening hours were shorter, from 1pm till 8pm daily, but for society members and their families, they were now free.

Though no longer in use as baths after 1906, the building was not demolished until 1970.

== The second (current) Turkish baths, Milton Road ==
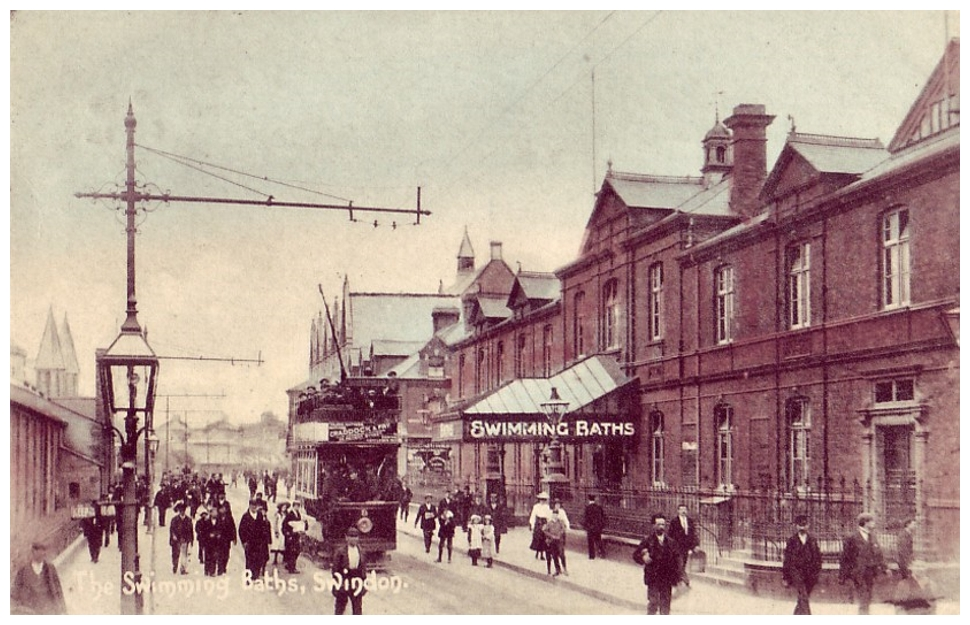
The Medical Fund Baths & Dispensary viewed from Faringdon Road in 1905

In 1891, the company built a large red brick Queen Anne style building in Faringdon Road to house the Medical Fund Society and its various services. Designed by local architect, John James Smith, it initially housed a new dispensary, treatment rooms, and separate swimming pools for men and women. But it made sense to bring all the fund's baths together and in December 1906 new Turkish and slipper baths were opened, with their own entrance round the corner in Milton Road. The earliest plans for the new baths date from 1904 so while, strictly speaking, they are Victorian-style Turkish baths, they are indistinguishable from any which might have been designed before the queen died in 1901.

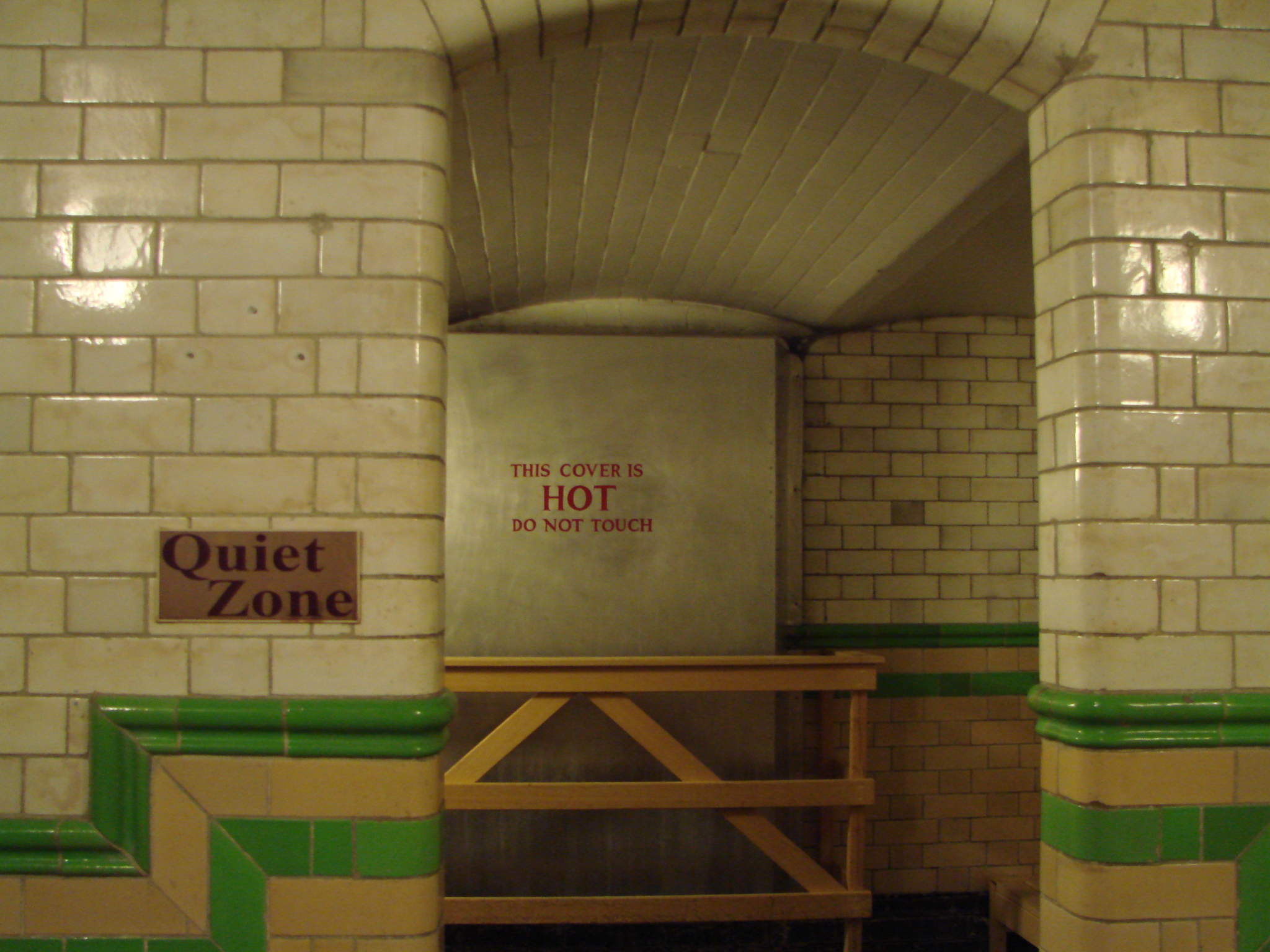
Partial view of the two hottest rooms

The men’s Turkish baths were well-designed, and although, over the years, alterations were made, the structure and appearance of the three original hot rooms remain virtually unchanged. The adjoining shampooing room had two marble slabs and a circular needle shower, with shampooing continuing until well into the 1990s. In its place are three additional modern showers. The men’s baths also include a Russian steam bath and a cold plunge pool. The pool, at 9ft wide, was twice the width of the majority of those later provided by local authorities, and when the baths were refurbished in the late 1980s, it was split in two lengthwise, with one half aerated like a whirlpool. At the same time, the original decorative tiling was replaced by plain tiles.

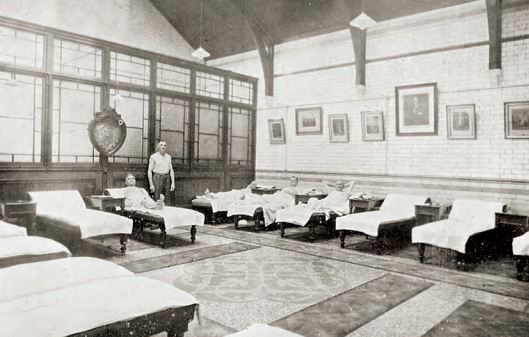
The cooling-room in the 1940s

The cooling-room was particularly spacious, with mosaic floors and, at the other end, a large fireplace with a clock over it. The original women’s Turkish baths on the first floor have been closed since at least the mid-1950s, though the door leading into them remains, complete with its coloured glass panel designed by a company employee, Mr Rice. The door now leads into offices.

The women’s baths were smaller than the men’s, with only two hot rooms. These led off a shampooing room, with its slab, needle shower, wash basin, and drinking fountain. A cooling-room, toilet, and six dressing cubicles completed the suite. The hot rooms were directly above the men’s, so that the heated air could be ducted vertically up from the basement furnace.

== Milton Road baths gallery ==
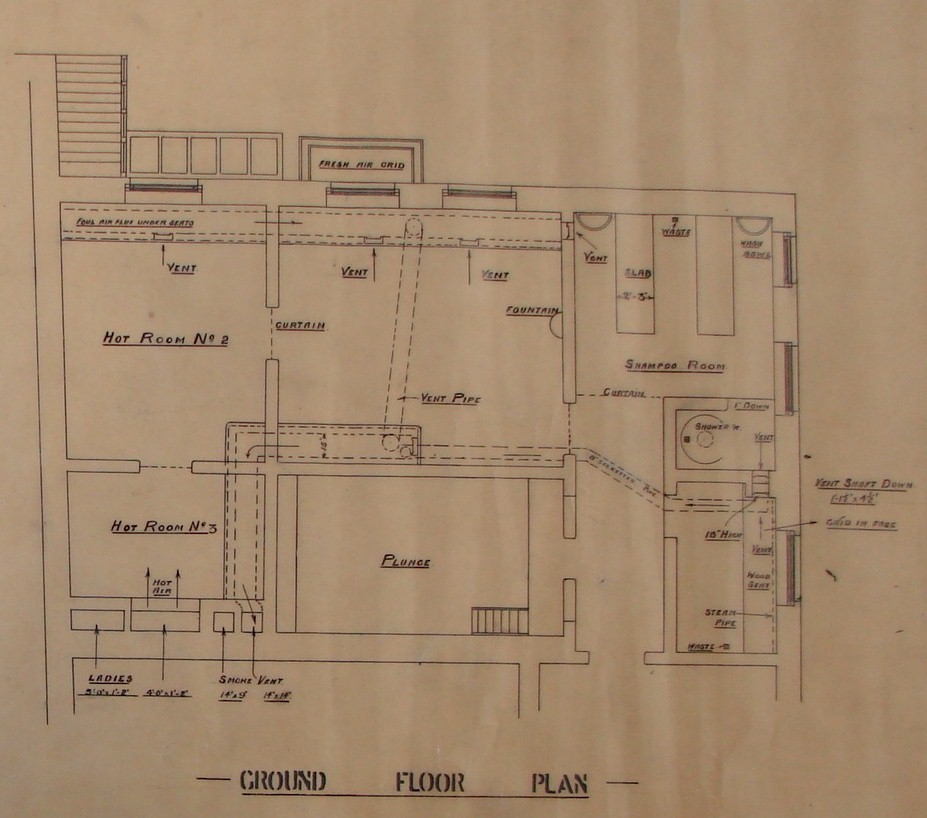
1905 Ground floor plan showing heating arrangements

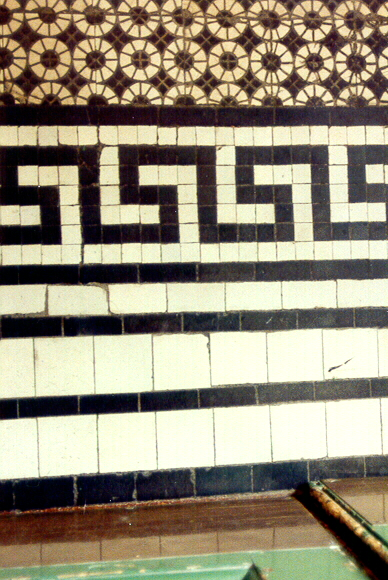
Part of the original plunge pool tiling

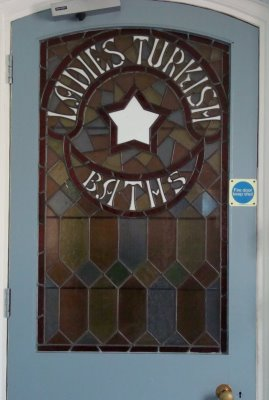
Stained glass door panel leading to 1st floor baths

== Legacy ==
Swindon's Victorian Turkish baths were but one of the facilities provided for its workforce by the GWR through its Medical Fund Society. This service was so comprehensive that it was an inspiration for the future National Health Service. Nevertheless, the NHS declined to include the Turkish or swimming baths when taking over the fund's other medical provision, just as it gradually withdrew its support for such baths (and spa treatment generally) in initially supported establishments such as those in Bath, Buxton and Harrogate.

And although Swindon’s Turkish Baths successively occupied premises on each side of Faringdon Road, and have been run by a series of managements, they are the longest surviving Victorian Turkish baths establishment in the world.
