= Le baruffe chiozzotte (overture) =

Le baruffe chiozzotte, Op. 32, is a concert overture by Leone Sinigaglia written in 1907.

It was introduced in Milan under Arturo Toscanini's baton in the spring of that year. Based on the comedy Le baruffe chiozzotte by Carlo Goldoni, it is a spirited work that opens with brilliant subject for full orchestra. A subsidiary theme, more serene in nature, provides contrast. The second main subject of the work is a folk song, first heard in the oboe; it is soon taken up by the first violins. With the quickening of tempo the music becomes more vivacious, with a chattering figure in the woodwinds and violins. The folk song returns, as does the initial theme, leading to a brief coda which concludes the work.
