= Eliza Brightwen =

Scottish naturalist, 1830–1906

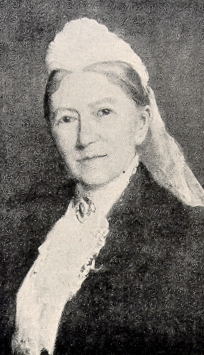
- Born: Eliza Elder; 30 October 1830; Banff, Aberdeenshire, Scotland
- Died: 5 May 1906 (aged 75)
- Occupation: naturalist
- Spouse: George Brightwen

Eliza Brightwen née Elder (30 October 1830 – 5 May 1906) was a Scottish naturalist and author. She was self-taught, and many of her observations were made in the grounds of The Grove in Stanmore, the estate that she shared with her husband outside of London. Brightwen was described in 1912 as "one of the most popular naturalists of her day".

== Personal life ==
Eliza Elder was born in 1830 in Banff, Aberdeenshire, Scotland, to Margaret and George Elder. She had three other siblings.

After her mother died in 1837, she was adopted by her uncle, Alexander Elder, co-founder of Smith, Elder & Co. Elder moved to Streatham to live with her uncle, and then to Stoke Newington, Hackney, North London. Her father died in 1853.

As a child, Elder expressed interest in natural history and described her youth as "extremely lonely and quiet". She did not receive a formal education though her publisher uncle had an extensive library, which served as a foundation for her future work.

In 1855, she married George Brightwen, a banker who then ran a successful business of his own. The couple moved to Stanmore and lived in a house called Elderslie, in Bushey, Hertfordshire.

Brightwen suffered from health problems, including chronic pain and fainting though the cause was never identified. She had a nervous breakdown in 1872.Then, she lived as a recluse for 10 years with little to no contact with her husband and friends. Brightwen rarely left the house and did not read. When George Brightwen died in 1883, she emerged from reclusiveness to be active intellectually and physically but continued to suffer from body pains for the rest of her life. She still rarely left The Grove.

Brightwen lived in Stanmore until she died in May 1906. The house, The Grove, had an estate of 170 acres (69 hectares), where she did much of her research. The couple renovated the house to a design carried out by Brightwen Binyon. She turned the billiard room into a museum after her husband's death.

Eliza Brightwen was a philanthropist and attended church regularly. She died childless and is buried at a church in Stanmore.

== Work ==
Brightwen did much of her research on location in the woods and grounds of her home, The Grove. She started writing about her work when she was 60 after the suggestion of a family member.

In 1890, she published Wild Nature Won by Kindness about animal life. She became well known as a naturalist for her "conversational and intimate writing", which was unusual for the time. In 1892, she published her second book, More about Wild Nature, followed by Inmates of my House and Garden, in 1895. The latter was considered her master work.

The concept of "home museums", as seen in More about Wild Nature, stems from her own home museum at The Grove.

She published a total of six publications during her lifetime. Her final work, a collection of essays titled Last Hours with Nature, was published posthumously in 1908. An autobiography was also published, with an epilogue by her nephew Edmund Gosse.

She socialised with Philip Henry Gosse (whose second wife, also named Eliza Brightwen, was her husband's sister), William Henry Flower, William Hooker and James Paget. She was also known to work with Sir William Hooker, director of Kew Gardens.

== Bibliography ==
- Brightwen, Eliza (1890). Wild Nature Won by Kindness. London: T Fisher Unwin.
- Brightwen, Eliza. More about Wild Nature. (1892)
- Brightwen, Eliza. Inmates of my House and Garden. (1895)
- Brightwen, Eliza. Glimpses into Plant Life. (1898)
- Brightwen, Eliza. Rambles with Nature Students. (1899)
- Brightwen, Eliza. Quiet Hours with Nature. (1903)
- Brightwen, Eliza. The Life and Thoughts of a Naturalist (autobiographical writings, journal, etc. introduced by Edmund Gosse, edited by W. Chesson, 1909)
- Eliza Brightwen. Eliza Brightwen, naturalist & philanthropist; an autobiography. Edited by W. H. Chesson, with introduction and epilogue by Edmond Gosse. New York: American Tract Society (1909)
