= Brightwen Binyon =

English architect (1846–1905)

- Born: 30 May 1846; Headley Grange, Victoria Park, Manchester
- Died: 21 September 1905 (aged 59); Bushey, Hertfordshire
- Occupation: Architect
- Buildings: Various buildings in Suffolk, the Corn Exchange, Ipswich, Concert Pavilion, Felixstowe

Brightwen Binyon, FRIBA, (30 May 1846 – 21 September 1905) was a British architect.

== Early life and education ==
Brightwen Binyon was born at Headley Grange, Victoria Park, Manchester, on 30 May 1846, to Jane née Brightwen (1805–1890) and Edward Binyon (1791–1855), a sugar refiner and tea dealer.

He was educated at a Friends School (formerly Stramongate School) in Kendal, before training as an architect under Alfred Waterhouse between 1863 and 1871. Later he gained membership of the RIBA. He then travelled around the European continent after which he moved to Ipswich. In 1874 he was living with his mother at 43 Fonnereau Road, Ipswich.

== Architecture career ==
Brightwen had an architect’s office at 36 Princes Street, Ipswich. Henry Percy Adams was later articled to him. Brightwen had many commissions in Suffolk including the Corn Exchange, the Ipswich Board School in Bramford Road, Ipswich and the Concert Pavilion, Felixstowe. In 1882, Ipswich council held a design competition for the Corn Exchange. Out of 15 entries to the council, he won using the nom-de-plume "North Light". In 1890, Sunderland, County Durham held an architectural design competition for a town hall on Fawcett Street. This competition was judged by Alfred Waterhouse and was won by Brightwen Binyon. He beat Frank Caws (another renowned local architect). The competition was dogged by accusations of corruption due to the link between Binyon and Waterhouse. In 1892, he won another design competition, beating 44 other designs for the Barrett Browning Institute in Ledbury, Hertfordshire. The design was based on the timber-framed Market House, which was opposite the site. It was completed in 1896. Nikolaus Pevsner was, however, not impressed by its style.

In 1897, he was the winner of design of the Felixstowe Spa and Winter Garden. But the design was not implemented.

He became a member of Ipswich Fine Art Club (during 1875–1903) and an exhibitor during 1881–85. He also exhibited at the Royal Academy between 1887 and 1895. In about 1892, the family moved to 'The Cedars', Anglesea Road, Ipswich and, after being in practice for over 25 years, he retired in 1897. He died in Bushey, Hertfordshire on 21 September 1905.

== Personal life ==
On 18 September 1879 in Darlington, Binyon married Rachel Mary Cudworth (1853–1949) of Darlington. She was the daughter of William Cudworth and Mary Thompson. They then lived at 5 Henley Road, Ipswich. Brightwen and Rachel had four children including Basil Binyon (1885–1947), a well-known electrical engineer appointed a director of the BBC in 1922, Mary Sims Binyon (1882–1976), an artist and modeller, Olive Binyon (1888–1971) and Janet Binyon (1880–1963). Their grandson was the conservation architect Sir Bernard Feilden (1919–2008).

Brightwen Binyon was the 2nd cousin once removed of poet Robert Lawrence Binyon who wrote the poem 'For the Fallen' .

== List of works ==
- 1875 – Wallpaper design (now in Victoria and Albert Museum).
- 1875 – Burlington Road Baptist Church, Ipswich .
- 1872 – The Grove, Stanmore, re-modelling in half-timber style. The home of Naturlaist Eliza Brightwen.
- 1879 – Bank Premises, Sudbury, Suffolk
- 1880 – Thistleton Hall, Suffolk
- 1881 – Sanford Street Boys’ School, Swindon, Wiltshire
- 1881 – Church Lodge,(No 1 Uxbridge Road), Stanmore
- 1878 – Municipal Buildings, Great Yarmouth, Norfolk
- 1879 – Ipswich Post Office, Suffolk
- 1879 – Ipswich School of Art
- 1879 – Queenstown school Swindon (closed 1990/demolished in 1993)
- 1881 – Gilberts Hill, Dixon Street, Swindon
- 1881 – Yarra Primary School, Richmond, Victoria, Australia
- 1882 – Corn Exchange, Ipswich, Suffolk
- 1882 – Bramford Road School, Ipswich
- 1883 – Hill House, Ipswich
- 1886 – Public Library & Museum, Folkestone, Kent
- 1888 – Seaside Villas, Felixstowe, Suffolk
- 1891 – Enlargement of Stanmore Hall for William Knox D'Arcy.
- 1890 – Sunderland Town Hall (later demolished in 1971)
- 1890 – Swindon Town Hall (Grade II listed building) Town Hall, Regent Circus
- 1890 – Nethaniah Almshouse, Over Stoke
- 1893 – The Mechanics Institute, Emlyn Square, Swindon, (Considerably enlarged)
- 1893 – New Public Library, Colchester
- 1893 – Warehouse, North Street, Colchester
- 1895 – Granary, Hythe Quay, Colchester
- 1896 – The Elizabeth Barrett Browning Institute, Ledbury
