= Bramford Road School =

Former school in Ipswich, England

Bramford Road School was a primary school in Ipswich, England. It was founded in a purpose-built building on the corner of Bramford Road and Gatacre Road. The architect responsible for the building was Brightwen Binyon for the initial work in 1882. The Gatacre Road extension was undertaken by E Fernley Bissopp, reaching completion in 1888.
